= Meteorological history of Hurricane Dennis =

Hurricane Dennis
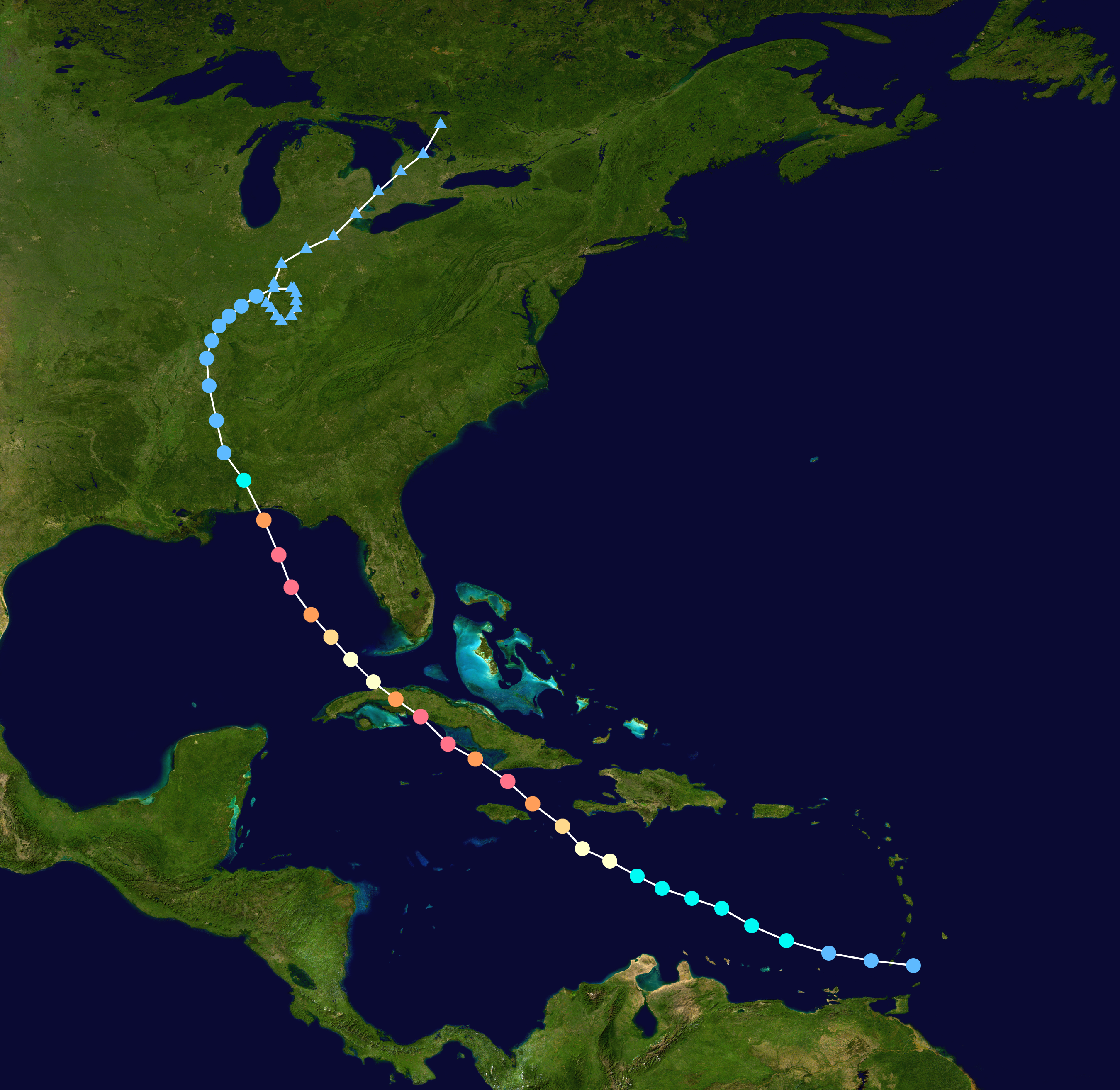
- Map plotting the track and intensity of Hurricane Dennis according to the Saffir–Simpson scale

Meteorological history
- Formed: July 4, 2005
- Remnant low: July 13, 2005
- Dissipated: July 18, 2005

Category 4 major hurricane
- 1-minute sustained (SSHWS/NWS)
- Highest winds: 150 mph (240 km/h)
- Lowest pressure: 930 mbar (hPa); 27.46 inHg

Overall effects
- Areas affected: Windward Islands; Greater Antilles (particularly Cuba); Southeastern United States; Ohio River Valley; Ontario
- Part of the 2005 Atlantic hurricane season

Hurricane Dennis lasted twenty-two days, beginning with its inception as a tropical wave over Africa on June 26, 2005, and terminating with its dissipation on July 18 over the Great Lakes of North America. The incipient wave that became Dennis emerged over the Atlantic Ocean on June 29 and moved briskly to the west. Dry air initially inhibited development, though once this abated the wave was able to consolidate into a tropical depression on July 4. The depression soon crossed Grenada before entering the Caribbean whereupon increasingly favorable environmental factors, such as low wind shear and high sea surface temperatures, fueled intensification. Turning west-northwest, the system achieved tropical storm status on July 5 and hurricane status the following day.

Formation of a well-defined eye and central dense overcast signaled Dennis's intensification into a major hurricane. The powerful storm soon struck Granma Province, Cuba, as a Category 4 early on July 8; violent winds battered the province and caused extensive damage. Paralleling the western coast of Cuba, Dennis attained its peak winds of 150 mph (240 km/h) later that day before making a second landfall in the country, this time in Matanzas Province. Interaction with the mountains of Cuba caused significant weakening; however, once Dennis emerged over the Gulf of Mexico on July 9, it was able to quickly reorganize. The hurricane reached Category 4 strength for a third time on July 10 as it approached Florida, weakening somewhat before striking the state. Dramatic weakening ensued once the cyclone moved ashore. Dennis lingered as a tropical depression and remnant low for roughly a week, traversing the Mississippi River Valley and the Ohio River Valley before finally dissipating over Ontario on July 18.

== Origins ==
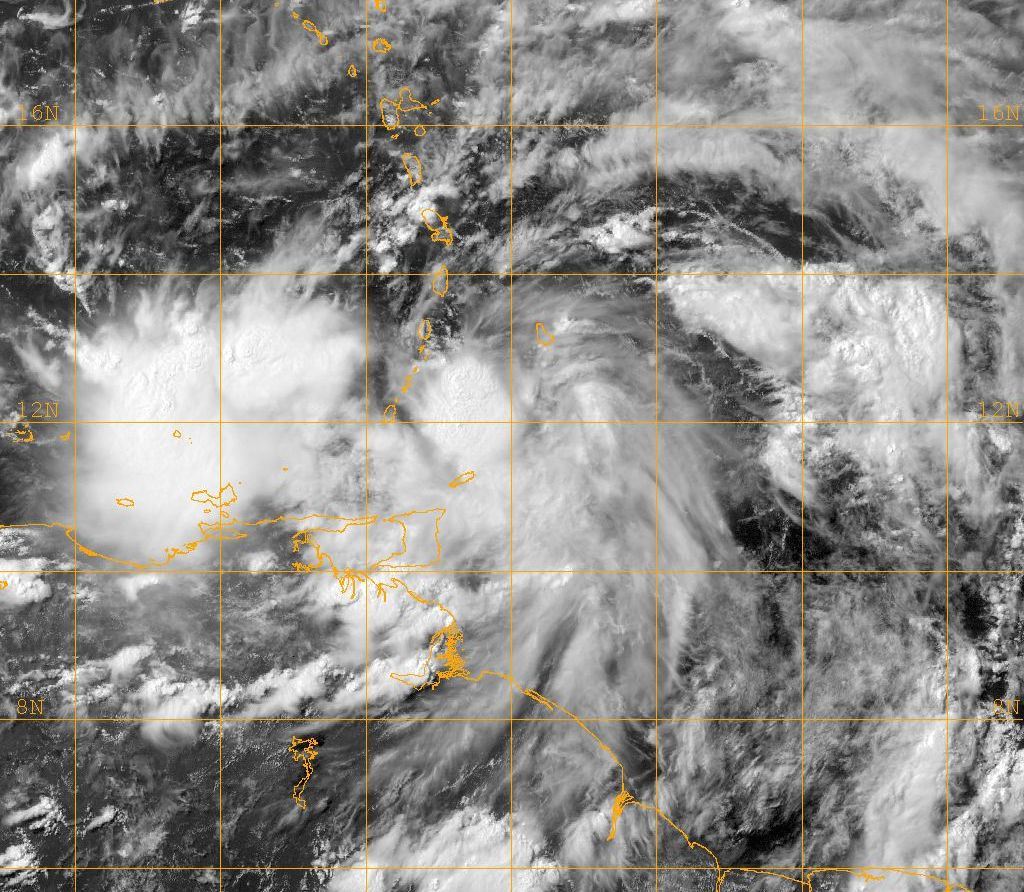
Tropical Depression Four upon its classification as a tropical cyclone on July 4, just north of Tobago.

On June 26, 2005, the National Hurricane Center (NHC) began monitoring a tropical wave well-inland over Africa. The feature was tracked via radiosonde observations from various nations for two days before being analyzed as a surface feature on June 28 over western Senegal. Accompanied by scattered convection—shower and thunderstorm activity—the westward moving system featured some cyclonic flow; it emerged over the Atlantic Ocean early on June 29. Conflicting observations from Dakar, Senegal, made tracking the wave difficult, with surface observations revealing a clear shift in wind direction and upper-level soundings showing no change. Regardless of the exact position of the system, accompanying convection soon diminished and the system became ill-defined. By June 30, the system grew significantly and multiple low-level circulations developed within the broader cyclonic envelope. Weather models at the time depicted a low probability of tropical cyclogenesis in the subsequent days. Gradual development ensued over the following days, though the broad circulation initially remained largely devoid of convection due to dry air associated with the Saharan Air Layer.

Two distinct low-level centers became apparent on July 2 as the overall system progressed west. Surface observations from the Windward Islands and Guyana depicted a broad circulation; however, satellite animations failed to show a defined center, inhibiting its classification as a tropical cyclone. The westernmost of the two centers moved across the Windward Islands early on July 4 and lost organization soon thereafter. Banding features developed with the eastern circulation throughout the day, consolidating around a 1012 mbar (hPa; 29.89 inHg) low. Later on July 4, upper-level outflow—an anticyclonic feature that provides thermal ventilation for tropical cyclones and allows for further development—became increasingly prominent. With continued organization, the NHC classified the system as Tropical Depression Four at 18:00 UTC at which time it was situated 65 mi (105 km) east of St. George's, Grenada.

== Intensification and Cuban landfalls ==
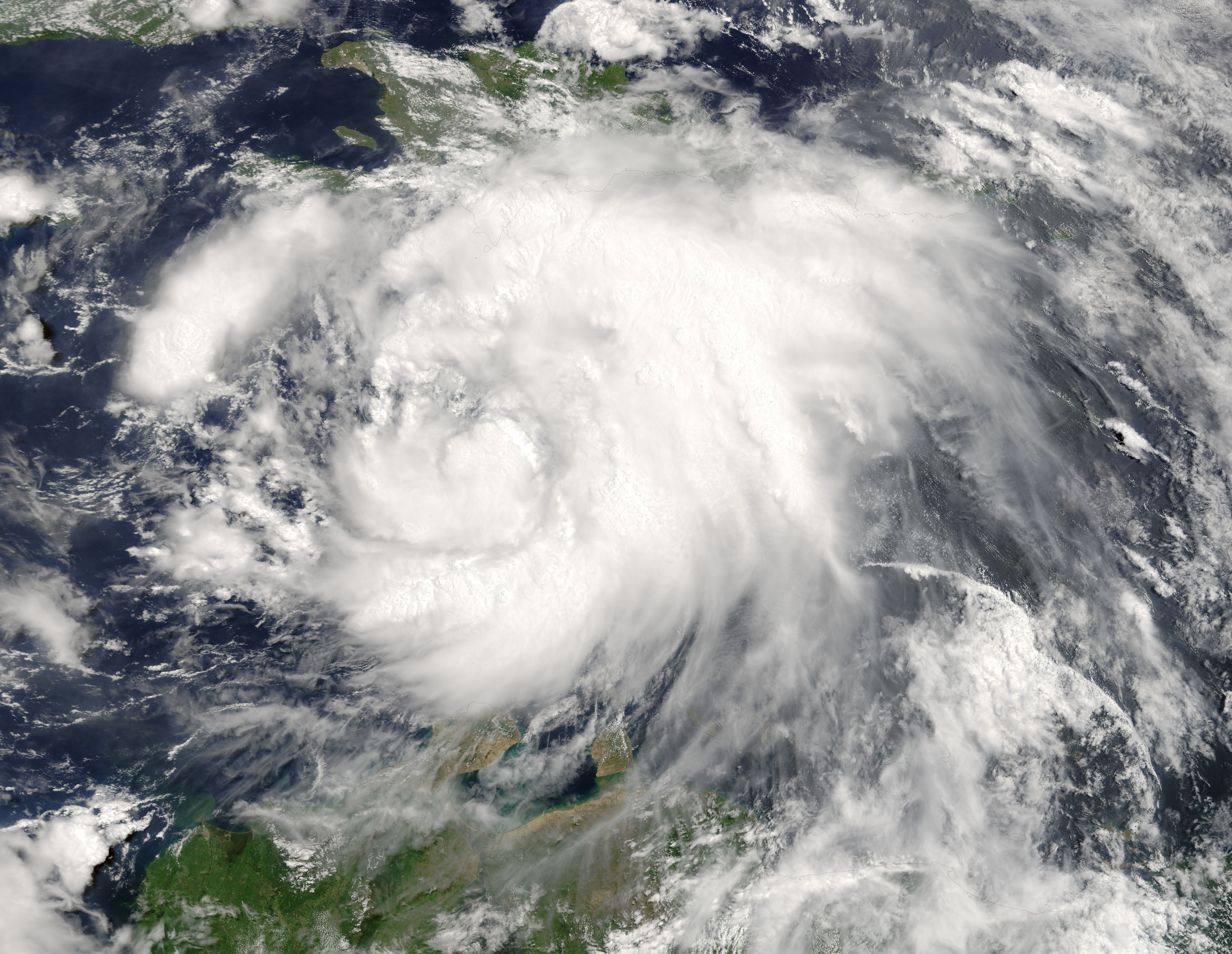
Tropical Storm Dennis organizing over the eastern Caribbean Sea on July 6

Embedded within deep east-southeasterly flow and along the periphery of a subtropical ridge, the depression moved rapidly along a west-northwest course; it soon made landfall over Grenada at 21:00 UTC on July 4 with maximum sustained winds of 35 mph (55 km/h). Upon entering the Caribbean, deep convection flared over the system. Environmental conditions ahead of the depression favored intensification into a hurricane, with little to no wind shear—analyzed to be roughly 25 mph (35 km/h) below average—and high sea surface temperatures around 84 °F (29 °C) present along its path. Based on satellite intensity estimates obtained through the Dvorak technique, the depression is assessed to have become a tropical storm by 12:00 UTC on July 5. Accordingly, the NHC assigned it the name Dennis at this time. This marked the earliest formation of a season's fourth named storm on record; however, this was later surpassed by Tropical Storm Debby of 2012 which was named on June 23.

Throughout July 6, convection steadily consolidated as the system acquired a more northerly component to its track. Hurricane hunters investigating Dennis found steadily falling barometric pressures, indicative of intensification. Around 22:00 UTC, observation from the aircraft indicated that Dennis achieved hurricane-strength; a central pressure of 985 mbar (hPa; 29.09 inHg) and flight-level winds of 91 mph (146 km/h) were measured. A central dense overcast soon blossomed over the hurricane's center while microwave satellite imagery depicted a closed, well-defined mid-level eye. At this point, the only factor inhibiting development was interaction with the mountains of Hispaniola and Jamaica. Dennis developed unusually prominent outflow, especially along its western side, for its location and time of year due in part to an unseasonably weak trough over the mid-Atlantic.

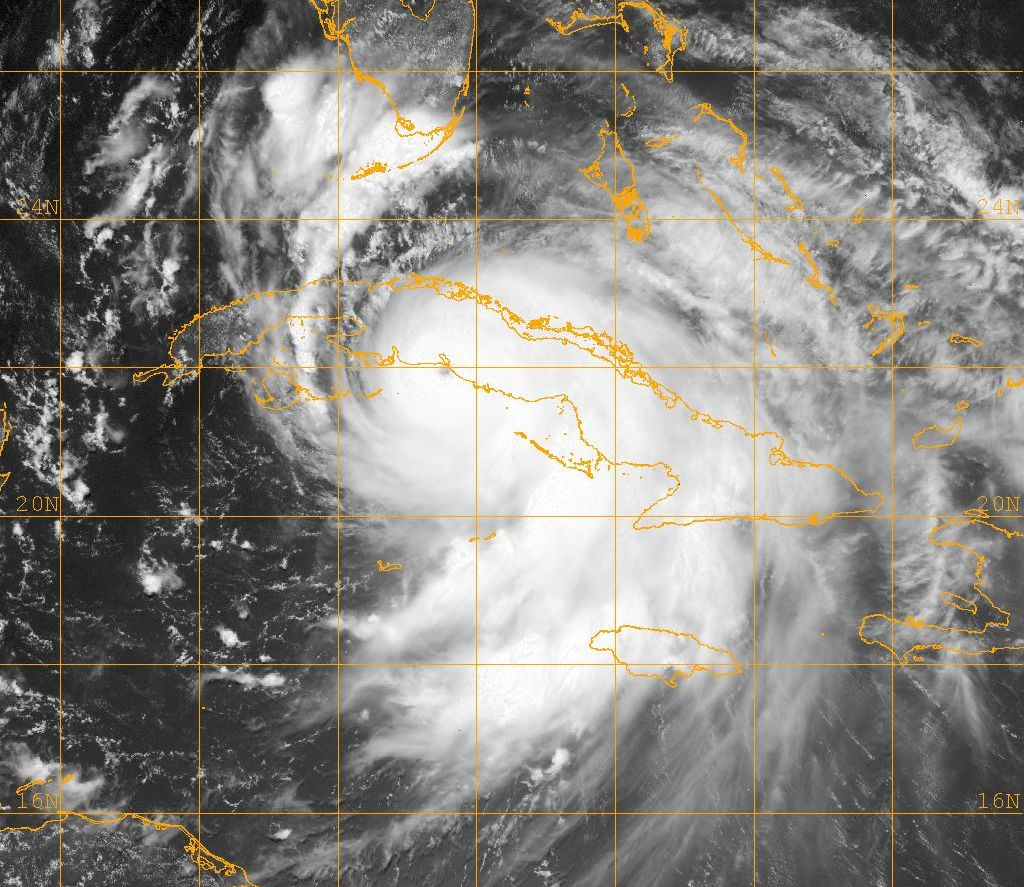
Hurricane Dennis shortly before making landfall in Matanzas Province, Cuba, on July 8 as a Category 4.

Rapid intensification ensued throughout July 7, as Dennis turned more northwest and tracked through the Jamaica Channel. A well-defined, 10 mi (16 km) eye formed within the hurricane's central dense overcast that evening. Dennis achieved major hurricane status by 18:00 UTC and Category 4 status by 00:00 UTC on July 8 as it approached southern Cuba. An abbreviated eyewall replacement cycle likely took place during this period as the eye expanded to 18 to 23 mi (29 to 37 km) in diameter. Reconnaissance flying in the storm reported flight-level winds of 154 mph (248 km/h), and based on this Dennis is estimated to have reached its initial peak with surface winds of 140 mph (225 km/h). Around 02:45 UTC, Dennis briefly moved over Granma Province, Cuba, with its center crossing the coast near Punta del Inglés (close to Cabo Cruz). Violent and destructive winds battered the province. A weather station in Cabo Cruz reported sustained winds of 133 mph (214 km/h) and a gust to 148 mph (238 km/h) before being destroyed.

Interaction with land caused slight weakening; however, Dennis soon emerged over the Gulf of Guacanayabo and the region's shallow, warm waters fueled an abrupt reorganization. The hurricane traveled along the western spine of the Jardines de la Reina archipelago, subjecting the islands to Category 3 and 4 strength winds. Paralleling the coast of Cuba, Dennis attained its peak winds of 150 mph (240 km/h) around 12:00 UTC on July 8. Hurricane hunters observed flight-level winds of 173 mph (278 km/h) and a pressure of 938 mbar (hPa; 27.70 inHg) around this time. The former value indicated surface winds around Category 5 strength while the latter yielded slightly lower winds, via a pressure-wind relationship method. The aforementioned peak strength was chosen accordingly as a compromise between the conflicting data. Another eyewall replacement cycle took place soon after this peak and slight weakening ensued. Around 18:45 UTC, Dennis made its second landfall in Cuba near Punta Mangles Altos in Matanzas Province with winds of 140 mph (225 km/h); a gust of 149 mph (240 km/h) was reported in Cienfuegos. Despite moving over land, weakening was initially slow due to the hurricane's proximity to water. Nearly six hours after moving ashore, Unión de Reyes was subjected to sustained winds of 110 mph (180 km/h) and gusts up to 123 mph (198 km/h).

== Gulf of Mexico and dissipation ==
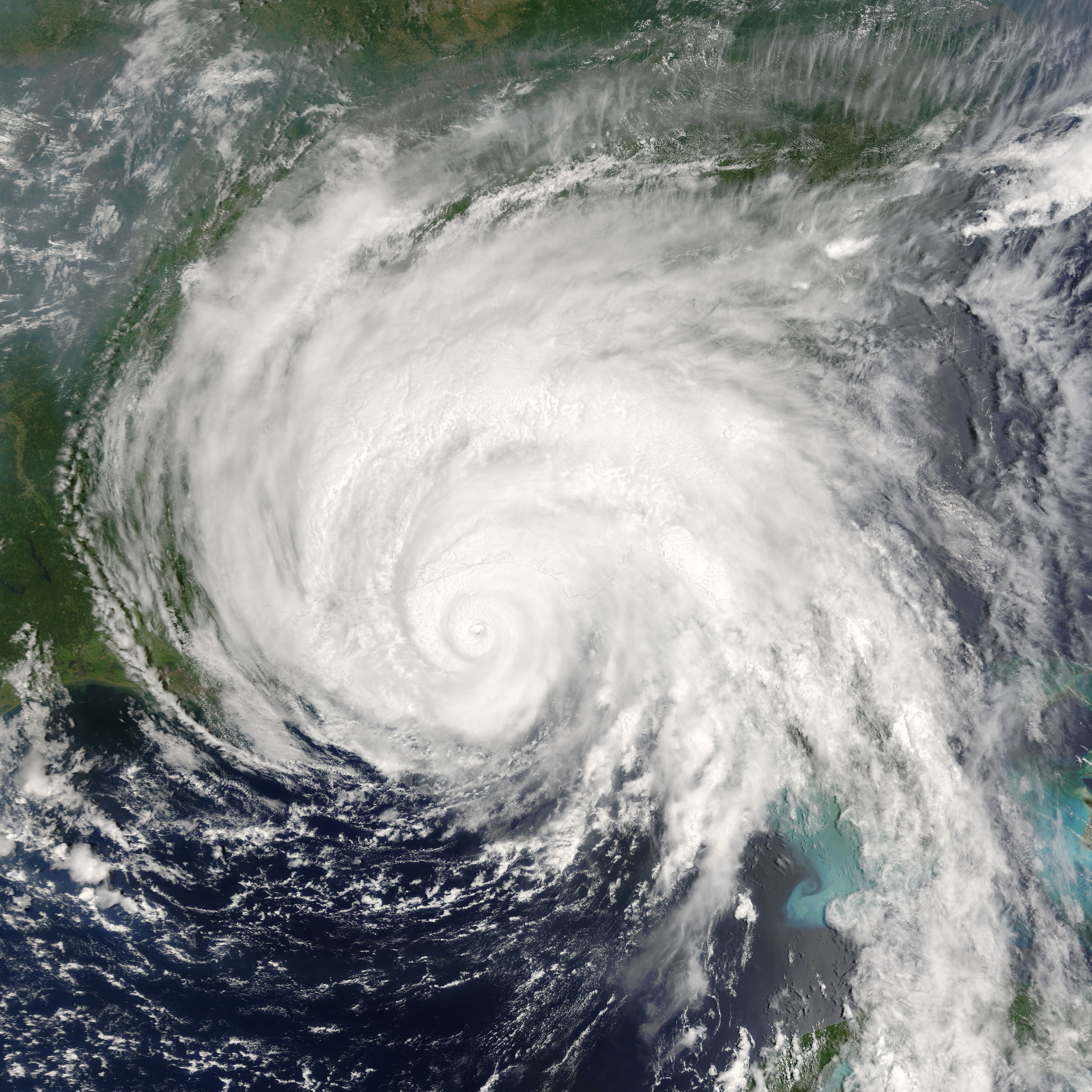
Hurricane Dennis hours before making landfall along the Florida Panhandle on July 10

Maintaining its northwesterly course, Dennis emerged over the Gulf of Mexico just north of Havana around 05:00 UTC on July 9. Prolonged interaction with the mountains of Cuba severely disrupted the hurricane's core, though it managed to retain a ragged 14 mi (23 km) wide eye. By the time Dennis emerged over water, its maximum winds fell to 85 mph (140 km/h) and its pressure rose to 973 mbar (hPa; 28.73 inHg). Situated along the western periphery of a ridge, a gradual turn to the north-northwest ensued. A cool eddy temporarily halted notable reorganization; however, once Dennis cleared this eddy it was able to strengthen. Starting at 18:00 UTC, the hurricane underwent rapid intensification "at a rate that bordered on insane", as described by forecaster Jack Beven. In the subsequent 18 hours, its central pressure fell by 32 mbar (hPa; 0.94 inHg), including a drop of 11 mbar (hPa; 0.32 inHg) in 1 hour and 35 minutes. Hot towers extending to 10 mi (16 km) were observed during the strengthening. The intensification culminated with Dennis attaining winds of 145 mph (230 km/h) at 06:00 UTC on July 10 and reaching its lowest pressure of 930 mbar (hPa; 27.46 inHg) at 12:00 UTC. This ranked Dennis as the strongest pre-August hurricane in the Atlantic basin; however, this was eclipsed just six days later by Hurricane Emily which was the first July Category 5 on record. At this time, the hurricane was situated roughly 180 mi (290 km) southwest of Tallahassee, Florida. Although Dennis featured a large circulation with tropical storm-force winds extending up to 230 mi (370 km) from its center, its core was compact and hurricane-force winds only stretched 40 mi (65 km) outward.

During the latter part of July 10, Dennis traversed an area with lower ocean heat content. Coupled with entrainment of mid- to upper-level dry air, notable weakening took place as the hurricane approached the Florida Panhandle. Around 19:30 UTC, Dennis made its third and last landfall as a major hurricane over Santa Rosa Island, between Navarre Beach and Gulf Breeze, with estimated winds of 120 mph (195 km/h) and a pressure of 946 mbar (hPa; 27.94 inHg). A Florida Coastal Management Program tower in Navarre observed sustained winds of 99 mph (159 km/h) and a gust to 121 mph (195 km/h). Dramatic weakening ensued once the hurricane moved onshore, with winds falling below tropical storm-force in just 12 hours. Upon weakening to a depression on July 11, handling of operational advisories was transferred from the NHC to the Weather Prediction Center (formerly the Hydrometeorological Prediction Center).

The lingering depression continued north-northwest through the Mississippi River Valley and gradually slowed. Weakening steering currents caused Dennis to slow and turn northeast as it traversed the Ohio River Valley on July 12–13. Dennis's circulation became elongated and the system degenerated into a non-convective remnant low by 12:00 UTC on July 13 as it moved across Illinois. Thereafter, the cyclone executed a prolonged clockwise loop over the state before accelerating northeast on July 16. During this period, a band of heavy precipitation set up over the southern Appalachian Mountains; record rain fell across northern Georgia, with localized totals exceeding 10 in (250 mm). The remnants later crossed the Great Lakes before being absorbed into a larger extratropical cyclone over Ontario on July 18.

== See also ==
- 2005 Atlantic hurricane season
- Hurricane Emily (2005)
- Meteorological history of Hurricane Katrina
- Meteorological history of Hurricane Wilma
