= Effects of Hurricane Wilma in Mexico =

Hurricane Wilma
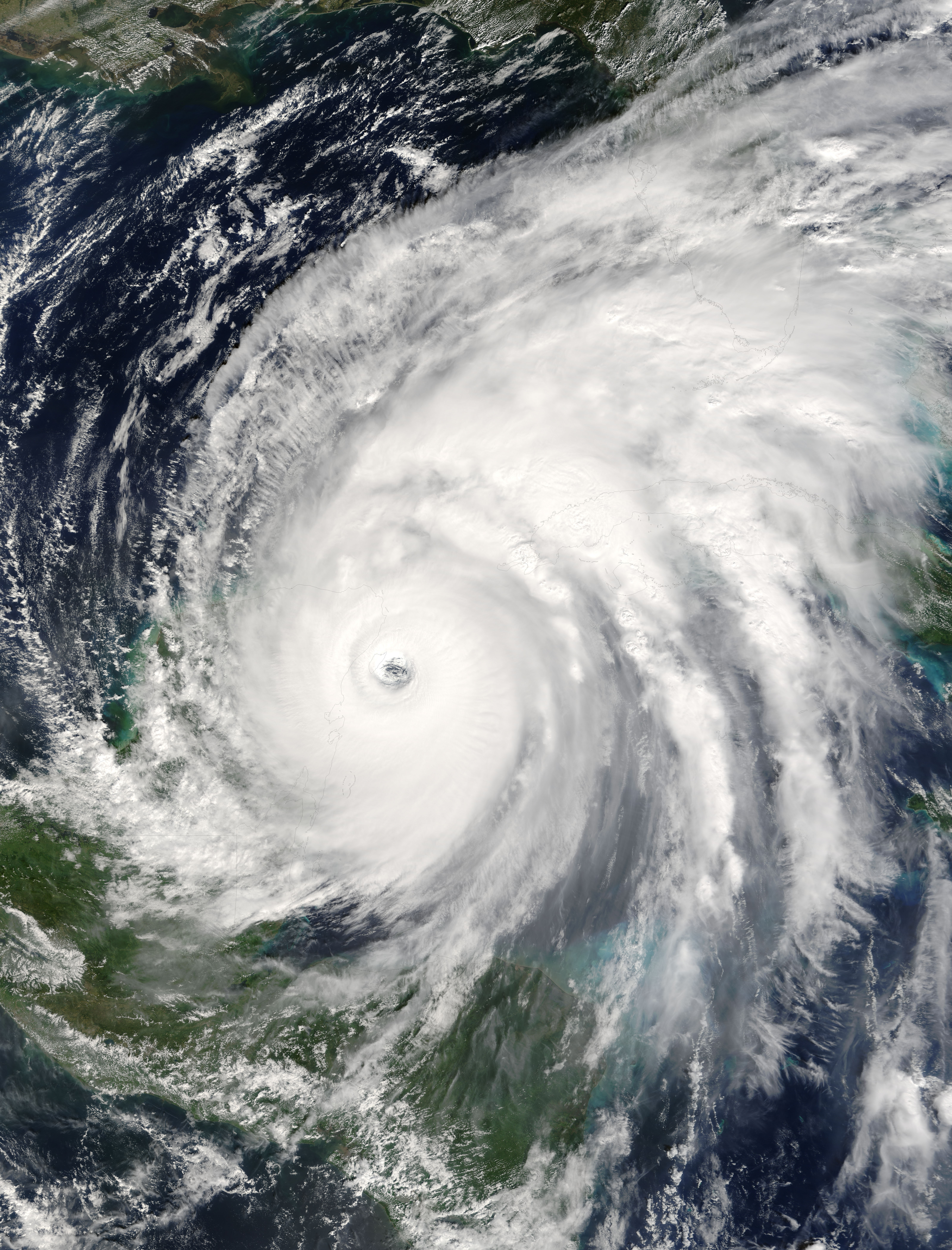
- Wilma approaching the island of Cozumel on October 21

Category 4 major hurricane
- 1-minute sustained (SSHWS/NWS)
- Highest winds: 150 mph (240 km/h)
- Lowest pressure: 927 mbar (hPa); 27.37 inHg

Overall effects
- Fatalities: 8
- Damage: $442 million (2005 USD)
- Areas affected: Yucatán Peninsula (especially Quintana Roo)
- Part of the 2005 Atlantic hurricane season
- History: Meteorological history; Effects: Mexico; Florida; Other wikis: Commons: Wilma images

Hurricane Wilma significantly affected the Yucatán Peninsula, bringing destruction to the area. The storm developed on 15 October in the Caribbean. Four days later, it intensified into the strongest Atlantic hurricane on record as determined by barometric pressure. Wilma weakened as it moved slowly northwestward, eventually making landfall late on 21 October on the island of Cozumel. At the time, it was a Category 4 hurricane on the Saffir–Simpson scale. Early the next day, the hurricane made another landfall on the Mexican mainland near Puerto Morelos. Wilma exited the Yucatán Peninsula into the Gulf of Mexico on 23 October.

The large and powerful hurricane dropped torrential rainfall across the northeastern Yucatán Peninsula and on offshore islands. Over a 24-hour period, Wilma produced 1,633.98 mm (64.330 in) of rainfall, the greatest 24-hour accumulation ever recorded in the Western Hemisphere. Parts of the Yucatán Peninsula experienced tropical storm-force winds for nearly 50 hours. An anemometer recorded a reading of 212 km/h (132 mph) before the instrument failed. The hurricane moved ashore with an estimated 4.6 m (15 ft) storm surge, accompanied by 5 to 8 m (16 to 26 ft) waves which reached the third stories of some buildings. Wilma severely eroded the beaches of eastern Quintana Roo and caused flooding in neighboring Yucatán.

Wilma contributed to eight deaths in Mexico – seven in Quintana Roo and one in Yucatán. Hurricane Wilma directly inflicted about $4.8 billion (MXN, US$442 million) (Note: All damage totals are listed first in 2005 Mexican pesos, and converted to 2005 United States dollars (US$) via the Federal Reserve Bank of St. Louis.) worth of damage, mostly in Quintana Roo. It was the state's costliest natural disaster. Much of the damage was done to tourism sectors of Cancún and other nearby resort areas. The hurricane's indirect costs were significantly higher due to its disruption of tourism revenue, estimated at $13.9 billion (US$1.3 billion). About 98% of the lodging and resorts in Quintana Roo were damaged, including 110 hotels damaged or destroyed in Cancún. Nationwide, Wilma destroyed 9,463 houses and caused damage to 19,517 others. In Cancún alone, the hurricane left 300,000 people homeless.

== Background and preparations ==
Hurricane Wilma developed as a tropical depression on 15 October, 2005 in the western Caribbean Sea, and was named two days later by the National Hurricane Center (NHC). On October 18, Wilma became a hurricane, and subsequently underwent rapid deepening, attaining Category 5 status on the Saffir–Simpson scale on October 19. That day, Wilma became the most intense Atlantic hurricane on record, with a barometric pressure of 882 mbar (26.05 inHg), and maximum sustained winds of 185 mph (295 km/h). The hurricane was originally projected to transit the Yucatán Channel between Mexico and Cuba, but it maintained its northwest trajectory toward the Yucatán Peninsula. Wilma weakened as it drifted northwestward through the Caribbean over the next two days, although the NHC anticipated as late as 09:00 UTC October 21 that it would move ashore as a Category 5 hurricane. Wilma made landfall on the island of Cozumel at 21:45 UTC on 21 October, with winds of 150 mph (240 km/h), making it a Category 4 hurricane. At 03:30 UTC on 22 October, Wilma made a second landfall on the Quintana Roo mainland near Puerto Morelos. It then drifted across the northeastern Yucatán Peninsula, emerging into the Gulf of Mexico on 23 October.

On 18 October, the Mexican government issued a hurricane watch for the eastern coastline of the Yucatán Peninsula from Punta Allen to Cabo Catoche, including offshore islands. As the hurricane grew closer, these watches were upgraded to warnings and expanded from Chetumal in southern Quintana Roo to San Felipe, Yucatán; a tropical storm warning extended westward to Celestún. The warnings were discontinued on 23 October as the hurricane moved into the Gulf of Mexico. Mexico's national weather service – Servicio Meteorológico Nacional – issued 88 notices or bulletins related to Hurricane Wilma. Officials declared a state of emergency in 23 municipalities across the Yucatán, and placed Quintana Roo and Yucatán under a red alert, the highest on its color-coded alert system. Neighboring Campeche was placed on orange alert; Tabasco and Veracruz were placed on green alert; and Chiapas was placed on blue alert, the lowest warning on the scale.

Hurricane Wilma affected parts of northeast Mexico that had been struck by Hurricane Stan just two weeks earlier, as well as Hurricane Emily in July. Ahead of Wilma's landfall, workers trimmed trees near power lines and placed notices on roads. About 75,000 people in northeastern Mexico evacuated the path of the storm. Some 45,000 individuals, many of them tourists, rode out the storm in 200 emergency shelters. Among the facilities serving as shelters were schools, clinics, and in one Maya community, a cave. About 300 people had to be relocated when their shelter in Cancún flooded. Thousands of tourists fled the region before officials closed the international airports in Cancún and Cozumel. Cancún police ordered all residents to stay home during the storm. Los Premios MTV Latinoamérica – the MTV Video Music Awards Latinoamérica – were canceled due to the hurricane. The event was originally scheduled to occur in Playa del Carmen on October 20. Schools closures in Quintana Roo, Yucatán, and Campeche lasted up to 15 days in some areas.

== Impact ==
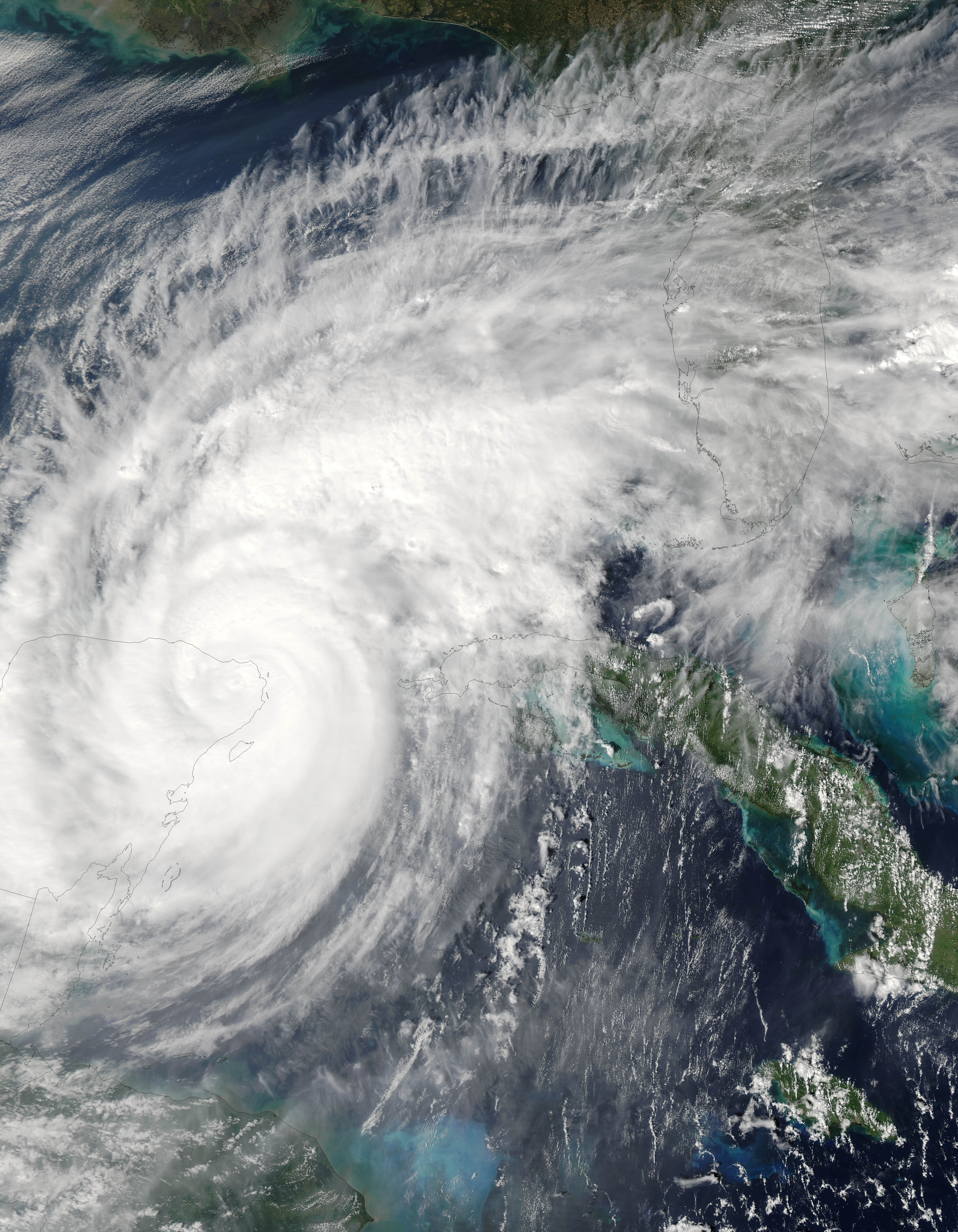
Hurricane Wilma about to exit the Yucatan Peninsula on 22 October

Hurricane Wilma produced torrential rainfall while moving slowly near the Yucatán Peninsula. Over a 24-hour period beginning at 12:30 UTC on October 21, a rain gauge on the offshore Isla Mujeres recorded 1,633.98 mm (64.330 in) of precipitation. This broke the record for Mexico's highest 24-hour rainfall total, as well as the highest 24-hour rainfall total in the Western Hemisphere. This was greater than the annual rainfall of Quintana Roo. Of that total, 1,082 mm (42.6 in) fell in a span of 12 hours. This was just 62 mm (2.4 in) short of the global record for 12-hour tropical cyclone rainfall set by Cyclone Denise in 1966. Other notable rainfall totals include 770 mm (30 in) in Cancún, and 376.5 mm (14.82 in) in Loché, Yucatán. Wilma lashed parts of the Yucatán Peninsula with tropical storm-force winds for nearly 50 hours. A station in Cancún recorded 10-minute sustained winds of 160 km/h (99 mph), with gusts to 212 km/h (132 mph) before the anemometer failed; gusts were estimated at 230 km/h (140 mph).

Wilma was attended by a significant storm surge, estimated as high as 4.6 m (15 ft) by the NHC, which resulted in extensive beach erosion. The hurricane also damaged coral reefs offshore. In Cancún, the wave action washed away about 700,000 m^{3} (247 million ft^{3}) of sand from beaches. The seawater intrusion upset the microbial composition of the Nichupté Bojórquez lagoon system near Cancún, and more broadly injured vegetation near the coast. High waves from the hurricane trapped or immobilized about 3,800 boats in Mexico, with another 96 being damaged. The hurricane also damaged 490 km^{2} (190 mi^{2}) of crops, largely in Yucatán. Affected agricultural industries included corn, papayas, tomatoes, chili peppers, and livestock; fences, wind vanes, and other equipment were all damaged. The storm killed about 10% of the region's bees, affecting 83,000 colonies. The storm damaged 900 km^{2} (350 mi^{2}) of grasslands, threatening the food supply of about 100,000 cows. Across the Yucatán Peninsula, the hurricane destroyed a cumulative 1,000,000 acres (400,000 ha) of forest.

Across Mexico, Wilma killed eight people – seven in Quintana Roo, and one in Yucatán. In Playa del Carmen, two people died and another seven were injured when a gas tank exploded. One person died in Yucatán after being struck by a fallen tree branch. Three people died on Cozumel. One person in Cancún was electrocuted while preparing for the storm. Another person died in Cancún because of glass from a broken window. Throughout Mexico, Wilma's damage was estimated at $4.8 billion (MXN, US$442 million). The hurricane caused an additional $13.9 billion (US$1.3 billion) in lost economic output and earnings, 95% of which was related to lost tourism revenue. Wilma damaged 28,980 houses along its path. Concrete buildings fared better than those constructed out of local materials. The storm damaged about 10,000 power lines, causing power outages for 300,000 people. Damage to transmission towers and antennas disrupted communications networks. The cost to repair the electrical infrastructure was $397.5 million (MXN, US$36.6 million), mostly in Quintana Roo. Across the region, Wilma damaged 473 schools, including about 60% of such institutions in Quintana Roo. Damage to schools accounted for $156 million (MXN, US$14.4 million) of the hurricane's cost. Hospitals, particularly in Cancún and Cozumel, sustained damage to medical equipment. High winds blew down traffic signals, signs, and fences.

Damage was heaviest in Quintana Roo, amounting to an estimated $4.506 billion (MXN, US$415 million); this made it the state's costliest hurricane. Across the state, Wilma destroyed 4,571 houses and damaged another 18,179 to some degree. Wilma also damaged 98% of the hotels in Quintana Roo, which includes the resort towns of Cozumel, Cancún, and Playa del Carmen. The hurricane caused significant damage in Cozumel and Isla Mujeres, both located off the east coast of the Yucatán Peninsula. The Cozumel boardwalk was wrecked. Wilma left parts of the Quintana Roo mainland without power, water, and gas. The storm damaged businesses, gas stations, and warehouses. High waves damaged the foundation of a hotel in Puerto Morelos, causing its partial collapse; it was later demolished. The hurricane caused significant flooding damage throughout the municipalities of Benito Juárez and Solidaridad, which include Cancún and Playa del Carmen. Floodwaters on Cozumel reached 1 m (3.3 ft) deep in spots.

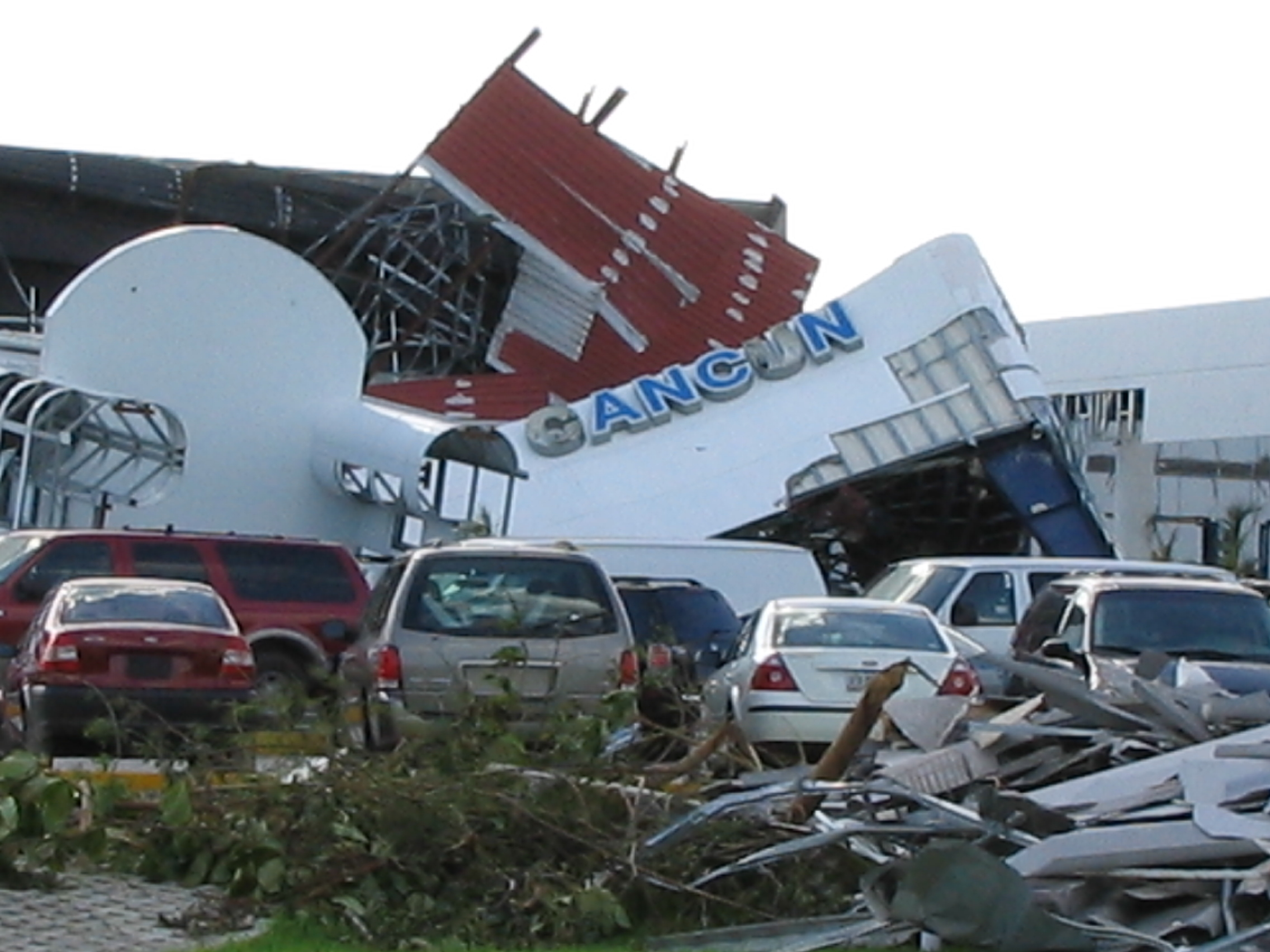
Storm damage in Cancún

In Cancún, about 300,000 people were left homeless, while another 700,000 people sustained damage to their homes. The water level in Cancún reached the third storeys of some buildings due to 5 to 8 m (16 to 26 ft) waves atop the storm surge. About half of the buildings at Cancún International Airport were severely damaged. The runway accumulated debris but was otherwise undamaged. Most significant to the city's economy, Wilma destroyed or severely damaged 110 hotels, mostly along Kukulkán Boulevard, which connects the line of hotels along the Nichupte Lagoon. The hotel damage was mostly material losses and generally not to the building's structure. Strong winds broke glass, tore off roof tiles, and wrecked water tanks. The storm surge washed away the foundations of two hotels, forcing them to be demolished. The high waves damaged hotel lobbies near the shore at El Miguelito. The sand at Playa Ballenas was entirely washed away, leaving behind the rocky base. Playa Delfines suffered similar effects. Two ferry terminals in Cancún were damaged.

Storm damage was estimated at $295.3 million (MXN, US$27.2 million) in Yucatán. There, the hurricane damaged 6,230 houses, with 4,892 of those being completely destroyed. Major causes of building failure were severe flooding and flimsy construction materials. Flooding was worst in the low-lying terrain of eastern Yucatán. The primary highway connecting Cancún and Mérida, Yucatán was impassible, and workers began restoration work immediately after the storm passed. Public access to the archaeological site Chichen Itza was closed while cleanup work got underway. Roof damage to schools in San Felipe and Tizimín resulted in the destruction of furniture and electrical systems inside. Flooding undermined roads and cut water service in Tizimín. Raging floodwaters battered bridges to Telchac Puerto, Chabihau, and Santa Rosa. High winds heavily damaged the El Cuyo port lighthouse.

== Aftermath ==
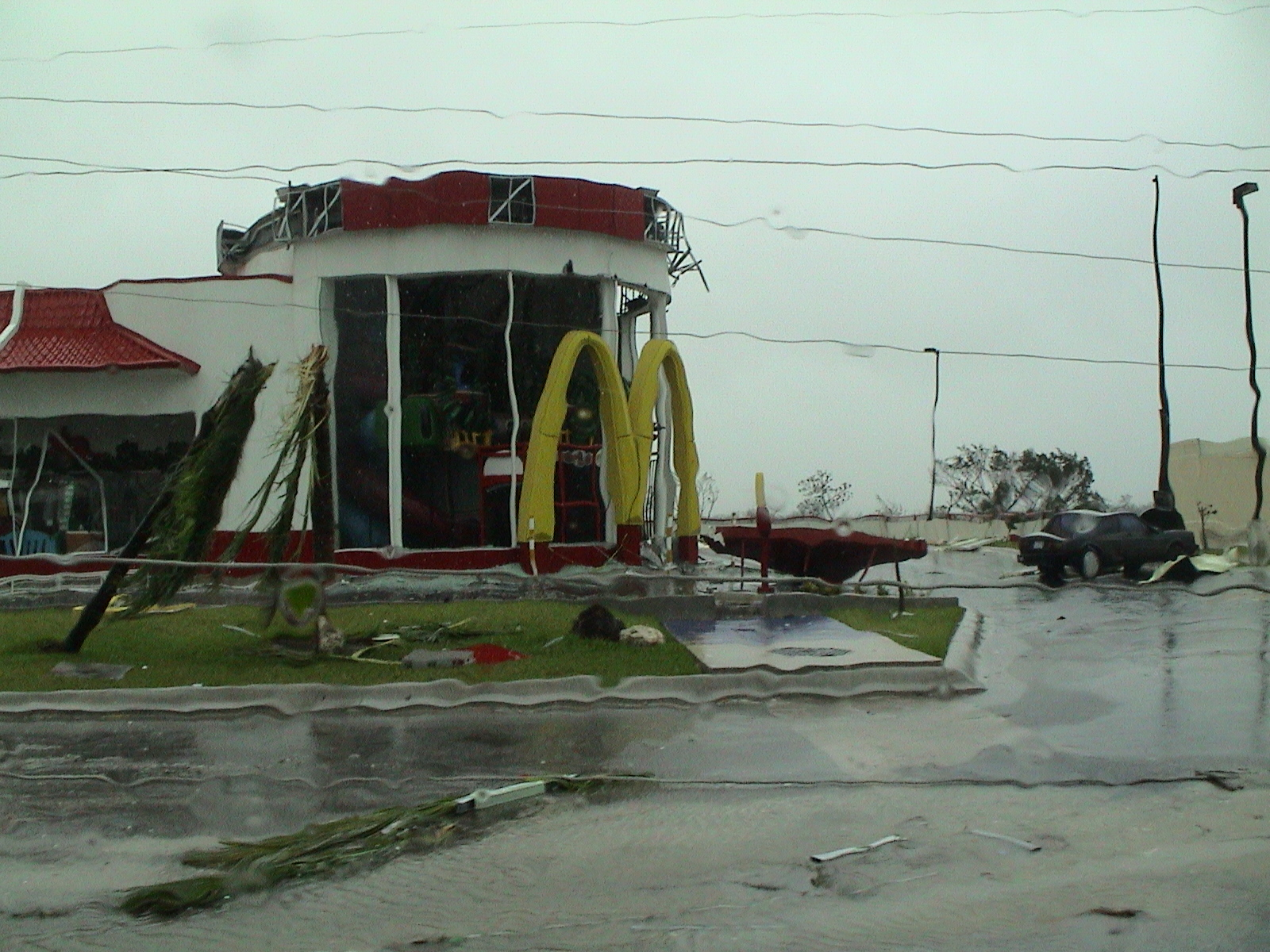
Storm damage to a McDonald's restaurant in Cancún

Storm shelters and affected communities both faced shortages in the immediate aftermath of Wilma. In Cancún, officials distributed food and water from city hall. There were 10 community kitchens across the city, each capable of feeding 1,500 people per day. Local and federal troops quelled looting and rioting in Cancún. Traffic on Cancún's Kukulkán Boulevard reopened on October 25 after the roadway was flooded for three days. The Mexican Army partially reopened Cancún International Airport on October 24 to facilitate the movement of aid and equipment; it reopened to the public three days later. While Cancún's airport was closed to the public, stranded visitors filled taxis and buses to Mérida, Yucatán. Located 320 km (200 mi) from Cancún, Mérida was home to the closest operational airport. Hotels and outgoing flights were filled to capacity in Mérida for several days after the storm. On October 27, President of Mexico Vicente Fox surveyed the storm damage. Fox's Secretary of Tourism, Rodolfo Elizondo Torres, orchestrated the response with a goal of quick revival tourist areas. President Fox pledged that 75% of the hotels would be repaired by December 15, promising loans and tax breaks to restore the industry. Most hotels in Cozumel, Isla Mujeres, and the Riviera Maya were reopened by early January 2006. The resorts in Cancún took longer to restore, but most were open for business by one year after the storm.

On November 28, the Official Journal of the Federation announced a disaster area for 9 of Quintana Roo's 11 municipalities – Benito Juárez, Cozumel, Felipe Carrillo Puerto, Isla Mujeres, Lázaro Cárdenas, Othon P. Blanco, and Solidaridad. Following the destructive impacts of Wilma and earlier Hurricane Stan, Mexico's state-owned bank, Banobras, authorized $21 billion (MXN, US$2 billion) to states and local municipalities for rebuilding. Mexico's development bank – Nacional Financiera – provided financial assistance for businesses affected by Wilma and Stan through a $400 million fund (MXN, US$37 million). Quintana Roo's state government began a temporary work program for residents whose jobs were impacted by the hurricane. Other Mexican state governments sent helicopters, machinery, food, and aid to the hardest hit areas. Healthcare workers provided vaccines and focused on preventing vector-borne diseases. About 3,500 people worked to restore water and power service, although total restoration of electricity was expected to take about a month. Mexico's Comisión Nacional de Libros de Texto Gratuitos sent 250,000 textbooks to Quintana Roo for the thousands of students who lost their academic supplies. To replenish beaches, crews installed geotubes and dredged about 2.5 million m^{3} (660 ft^{3}) of sand, supported by Mexico's federal government and the Instituto Mexicano de Tecnología del Agua. The new beaches were not as smooth or fair in color as the previous ones, which had formed naturally over time.

The Mexican Red Cross provided health care and food to emergency shelters. The agency sent 54 tons of food and water supplies to the Yucatán Peninsula, along with teams of experts to coordinate the disaster response. It also distributed 3,650 emergency kits to affected residents in Quintana Roo; the kits included plastic sheeting, mosquito nets, kitchen sets, and hygiene supplies. A Salvation Army plane dropped off 10 tons of bottled water to Cancún and took stranded tourists on its return flight. The United States Agency for International Development sent $9.8 million (US$900,000) to the Mexican Red Cross following hurricanes Stan and Wilma.

The name Wilma was later retired, meaning it will not be used again for another Atlantic hurricane. It was replaced by Whitney for 2011.

== See also ==
- Hurricane Gilbert – the strongest Atlantic hurricane before Wilma, struck the Yucatán Peninsula in 1988
- Hurricane Isidore – slow-moving hurricane in 2002 that struck the north coast of the Yucatán Peninsula
- Hurricane Janet – powerful hurricane that struck the Yucatán Peninsula in 1955
