= Loché, Yucatán =

Loché
- Town
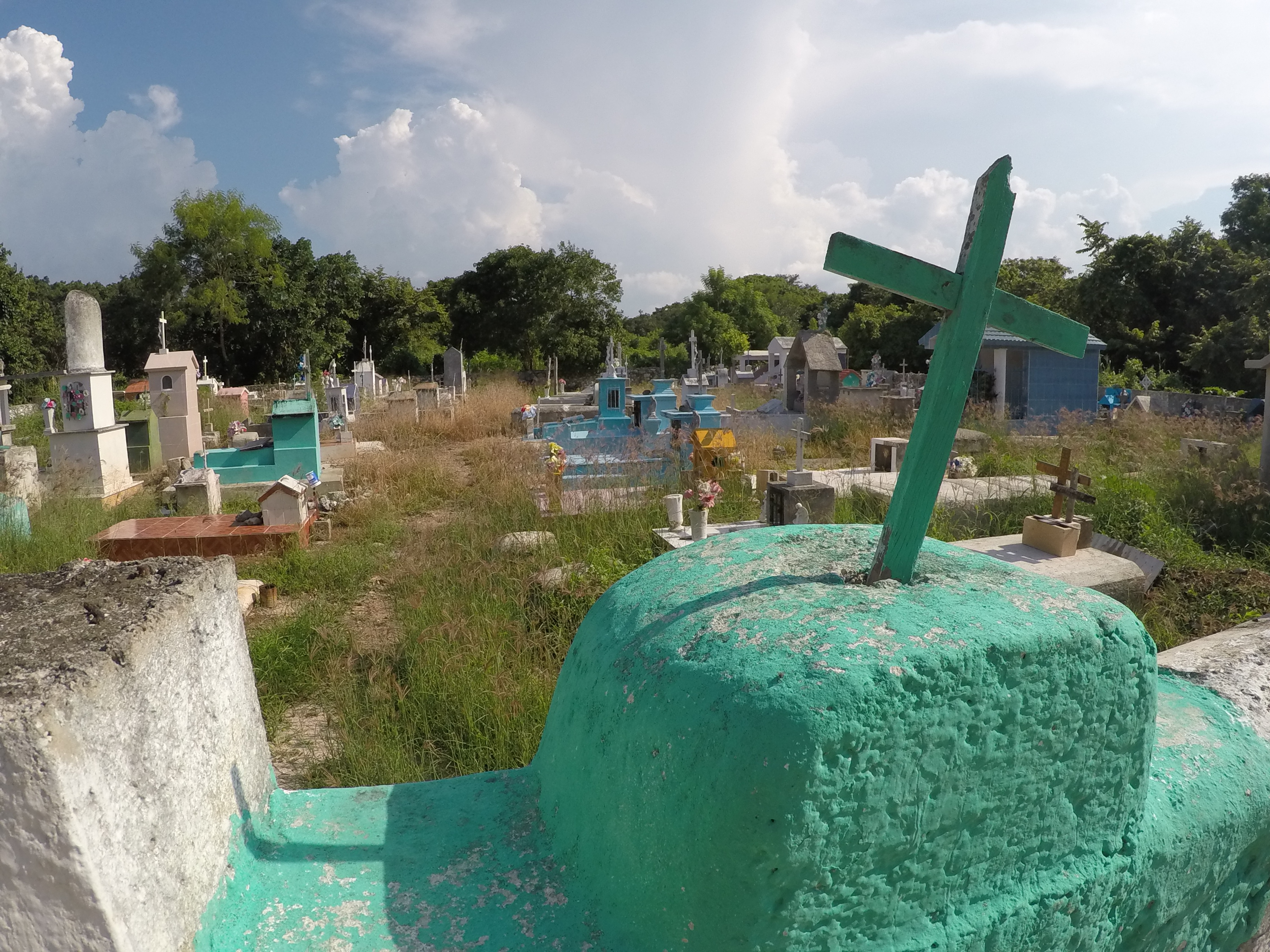
- Cemetery

- Location within Mexico
- Coordinates: 21°39′18″N 88°16′14″W
- Country: Mexico
- State: Yucatán
- Elevation: 7 m (23 ft)

Population
  - Total: 1,306
- Time zone: UTC-5 (Southeast (US Eastern))
- Postal Code: 97610
- Area code: 986

Loché is a community in the Panabá Municipality, Yucatan, Mexico. The name Loché is of Mayan origin. The town of Cenote mentioned in early Spanish records is sometimes identified with it.
