= Meteorological history of Hurricane Wilma =

Hurricane Wilma
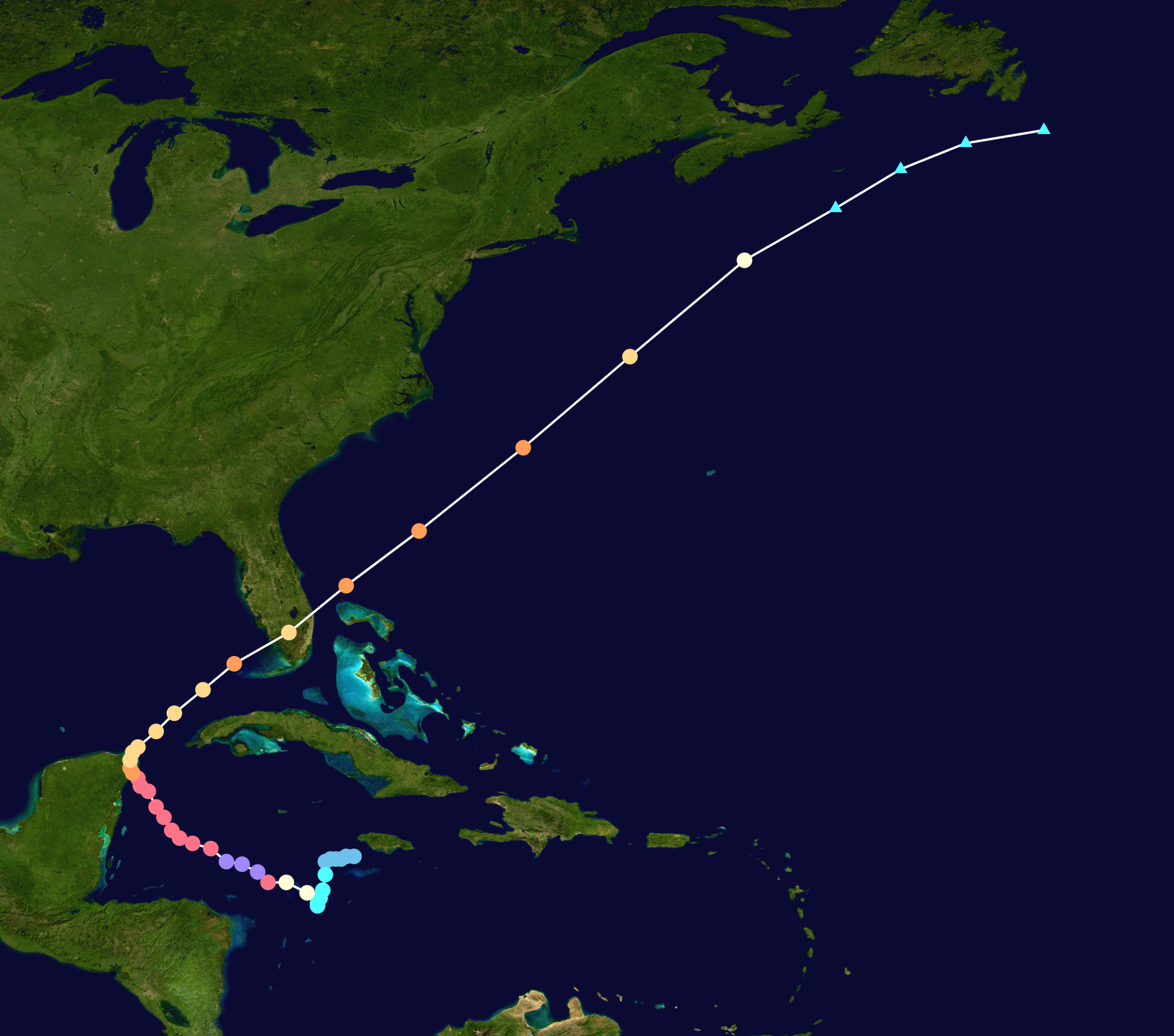
- Hurricane Wilma track map

Meteorological history
- Formed: October 15, 2005
- Dissipated: October 26, 2005

Category 5 major hurricane
- 1-minute sustained (SSHWS/NWS)
- Highest winds: 185 mph (295 km/h)
- Lowest pressure: 882 mbar (hPa); 26.05 inHg (Record low in Atlantic)

Overall effects
- Areas affected: Hispaniola, Jamaica, Cuba, Cayman Islands, Central America, Southeast Mexico, East Coast of the United States (mainly in South Florida), Bahamas, Atlantic Canada, Europe
- Part of the 2005 Atlantic hurricane season
- History: Meteorological history; Effects: Mexico; Florida; Other wikis: Commons: Wilma images

Hurricane Wilma was the most intense Atlantic hurricane by minimum central barometric pressure. On October 19, 2005, a dropsonde from a reconnaissance aircraft recorded a pressure of 884 mbar (26.1 inHg) over the western Caribbean Sea; due to the instrument missing the center of the eye, the National Hurricane Center assessed a minimum pressure of 882 mbar (26.0 inHg). The agency also estimated maximum sustained winds of 185 mph (295 km/h), making Wilma a Category 5 on the Saffir-Simpson scale. At its peak intensity, the eye of Wilma was about 2.3 miles (3.7 km) in diameter, the smallest known eye in an Atlantic hurricane.

Wilma's destructive journey began in the second week of October 2005, originating from a monsoon trough. A large area of disturbed weather developed across much of the Caribbean and gradually organized to the southeast of Jamaica. By 18:00 UTC on October 15, (Note: All time and dates are in Coordinated Universal Time (UTC).) the system was sufficiently organized for the NHC to designate it as Tropical Depression Twenty-Four. The depression drifted southwestward, and under favorable conditions, it strengthened into Tropical Storm Wilma on October 17, the 21st named storm of the 2005 Atlantic hurricane season. Initially, development was slow due to its large size, though convection steadily organized. From October 18, and through the following day, Wilma underwent explosive deepening over the open waters of the Caribbean; in a 24-hour period, the system's central atmospheric pressure dropped from 979 millibars (28.9 inHg) to the record-low value of 882 millibars (26.0 inHg), while the winds increased to 185 mph (298 km/h).

After reaching peak intensity, Wilma's inner eye dissipated due to an eyewall replacement cycle. Hurricane Wilma weakened to a Category 4 hurricane, and on October 21, it made landfall on Cozumel and on the Mexican mainland with winds of about 150 mph (240 km/h). Wilma weakened over the Yucatán Peninsula and reached the southern Gulf of Mexico before accelerating northeastward. Despite increasing amounts of vertical wind shear, the hurricane re-strengthened to hit Cape Romano, Florida, as a major hurricane. Wilma weakened as it quickly crossed the state and entered the Atlantic Ocean near Jupiter, Florida. The hurricane again re-intensified before cold air and wind shear penetrated the inner core of convection. By October 26, it transitioned into an extratropical cyclone, and the next day, the remnants of Wilma were absorbed by another extratropical storm over Atlantic Canada.

== Formation ==
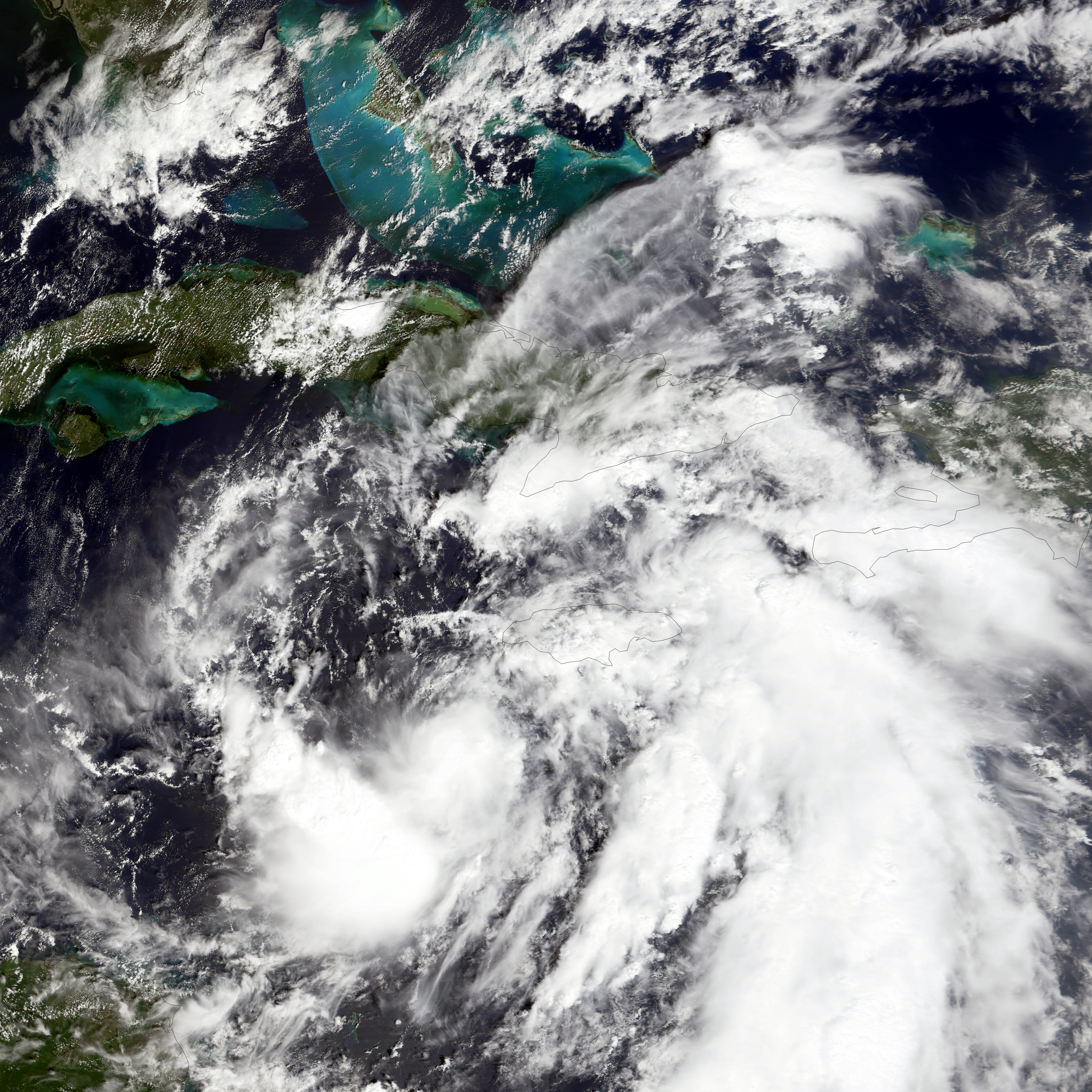
Tropical Depression Twenty-Four on October 16

On October 11, a broad monsoon-like trough persisted across the northwest Caribbean Sea. The trough split into two – the eastern portion moved to the northeast and merged with an extratropical cyclone, while the southern portion stayed in the Caribbean. The area of disturbed weather was enhanced by an upper-level low over the southwestern Atlantic. By October 13, a broad area of low pressure developed and persisted about 150 miles (240 km) southeast of Jamaica, possibly aided by the passage of tropical waves through the area at the time. A concentrated area of convection, or thunderstorms, formed on October 14. Upper-level wind shear prevented initial development, although it gradually decreased. By late on October 14, the National Hurricane Center (NHC) anticipated that a tropical depression would develop, and by the next day noted the potential the future system would become a hurricane.

By 18:00 on October 15, the surface circulation had become well-defined enough, with sufficiently organized convection, for the NHC to designate the system it as Tropical Depression Twenty-Four. At the time, it was located about 220 miles (350 km) east-southeast of Grand Cayman. In the first advisory on the depression, NHC forecaster Lixion Avila noted that there were "all indications that there could be a dangerous hurricane in the northwestern Caribbean Sea in 3 to 5 days." Upon its formation, the depression drifted to the southwest, steered by ridges to its northwest and northeast. The nascent depression was fed moisture from the Intertropical Convergence Zone to its south, but also entrained dry air from the northeast. Initially, the center of circulation was broad without a defined inner core. However, it was in an environment very conducive for development, with low amounts of wind shear and very warm water temperatures. The depression gradually developed rainbands, supported by well-established outflow and an anticyclone over the system. By early on October 17, the outer rainbands dissipated, which had previously dominated the structure of the cyclone, while deep convection developed near and to the south of the center.

== Peak strength and first landfall ==
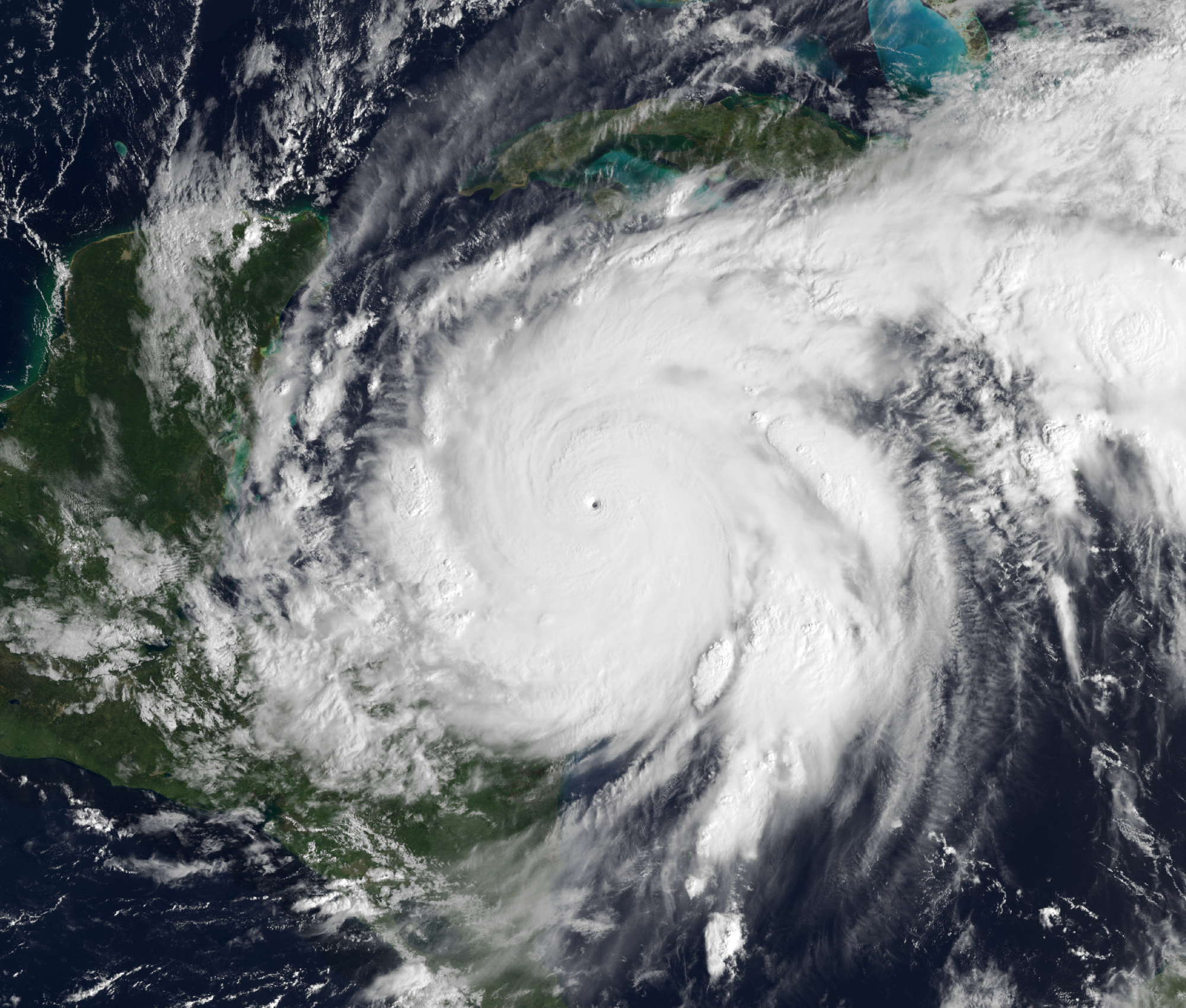
Hurricane Wilma shortly after peak intensity

At 06:00 on October 17, the depression strengthened into Tropical Storm Wilma about 200 miles (320 km) southeast of Grand Cayman. The convection increased and intensified on the southern side of the circulation, in the area of greatest moisture. Late on October 17, a Hurricane Hunters flight into Wilma recorded winds of 50 mph (80 km/h), but an unusually low pressure of 989 millibars (29.2 inHg), which would be more typical of a minimal hurricane. This was due to unusually low pressures across the region, which resulted in a lesser pressure gradient and thus lighter winds. The convection gradually became more symmetrical, and Wilma turned to the west-northwest on October 18. By that time, the ridge to its north had weakened. Wilma developed a small, ragged eye feature, and it attained hurricane status at 12:00 on October 18. Shortly after reaching hurricane strength, Wilma began undergoing explosive deepening at a rate the NHC described as "incredible". By 00:00 on October 19, Wilma attained Category 4 status on the Saffir-Simpson scale. Soon after, the hurricane developed "the dreaded pinhole eye", as described by forecaster Jack Beven, which was surrounded by a ring of deep convection. The cloud-top temperatures cooled to around −125 °F (−87 °C). Wilma's rapid intensification was due to a variety of factors' these included water temperatures up to 86 °F (30 °C), light wind shear under 11 mph (18 km/h), and a warm core in the upper atmospheric levels of the hurricane. Strong bursts of convection, or hot towers, developed around the eye.

From 00:00–06:00 on October 19, Wilma's pressure fell by 54 mbar (1.59 inHg), which was the greatest pressure drop in six hours for any Atlantic hurricane. While intensifying, the eye contracted to a diameter of just 2.3 mi (3.7 km), becoming the smallest known eye on record. At 08:01 on October 19, the Hurricane Hunters sent a dropsonde into the eye of the hurricane, which measured a minimum pressure of 884 millibars (26.1 inHg). As the dropsonde did not reach the calm winds in the center, the pressure was estimated at 882 millibars (26.0 inHg), the lowest pressure in an Atlantic hurricane on record. The pressure continued to fall as the flight left the hurricane, and it is possible the pressure was slightly lower. In the span of just 24 hours, Wilma had intensified from a 70 mph (110 km/h) tropical storm to a 175 mph (282 km/h) Category 5 hurricane, an unprecedented event for an Atlantic hurricane. At 12:00 UTC, Wilma reached peak winds of 185 mph (298 km/h). In 2019, Dr. Eric Uhlhorn of NOAA's Hurricane Research Division estimated that since the stepped-frequency microwave radiometer (SFMR) was not in use during Wilma, the maximum sustained winds could have reached as high as 209 ± 20 mph (336 ± 32 km/h) following the Hurricane Hunter mission, extrapolating from other high-end Category 5 hurricanes. At the time of its peak intensity, hurricane-force winds extended only 50 miles (80 km) from the small center of Wilma, with tropical storm force winds extending only about 160 miles (260 km).

Shortly after peaking in intensity, Wilma began to undergo an eyewall replacement cycle, which lasted about 24 hours. During that time, the coldest cloud tops surrounding the eye warmed slightly, and an outer eyewall developed. The inner eye weakened and dissipated while the 45-mile (72 km) wide outer eyewall became the dominant eye. Wilma fell to Category 4 intensity by 00:00 on October 20, although it still had a minimum central pressure of 892 mbar (26.3 inHg). The wind field expanded as Wilma moved northwestward through the western Caribbean, after a series of troughs eroded the ridge over the Gulf of Mexico. The eye became more distinct early on October 21. At about 21:45 that day, Wilma made landfall on the island of Cozumel with winds of 150 mph (240 km/h), making it a strong Category 4 hurricane. The hurricane weakened slightly as it continued northwestward, and struck the Mexican mainland near Puerto Morelos, Quintana Roo, at 0330 UTC on October 22, with winds of 135 mph (217 km/h) and gusts of up to 170 mph (270 km/h).

== United States landfall and dissipation ==
On October 22, the mid-level ridge to the north of Wilma essentially dissipated, leaving the hurricane drifting northward across the northeastern Yucatán Peninsula. As the hurricane moved further inland, the eye became cloud-filled as the deepest convection began to warm, and the winds gradually weakened during its passage over land. About 26 hours after making landfall on Cozumel, Wilma emerged into the southern Gulf of Mexico near Cabo Catoche with winds of about 100 mph (160 km/h). Upon reaching open waters, reconnaissance aircraft reported the remains of an inner eyewall and an outer eyewall oscillating between 70 and 90 miles (110 and 140 km) in diameter. Convection deepened around the eyewalls, and the inner core of convection, which had previously become disrupted over land, became slightly better defined.

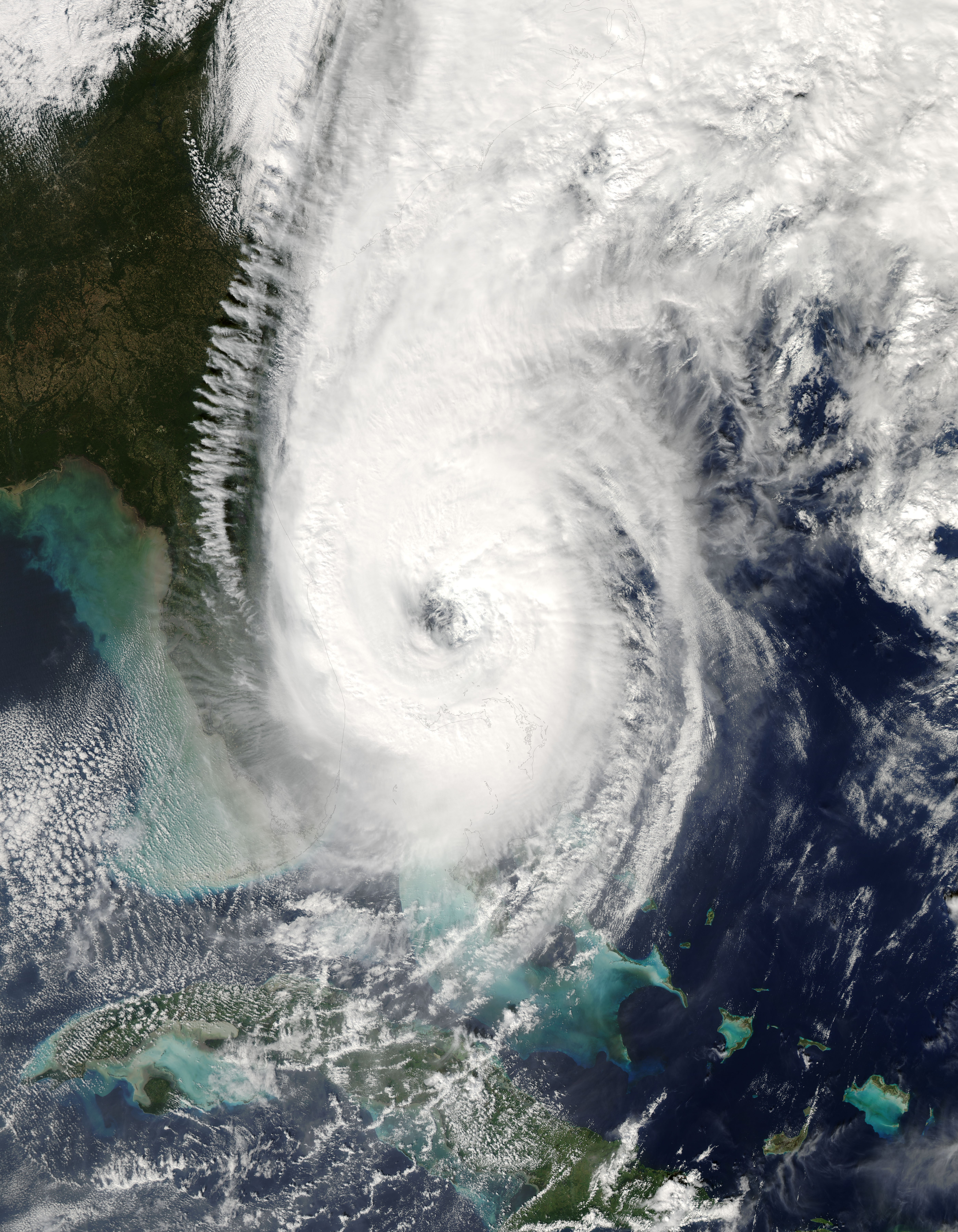
Wilma after leaving Florida for the waters of the Atlantic Ocean

A powerful eastward-moving mid-level trough across the central United States turned the hurricane northeastward and caused it to gradually accelerate. Vertical wind shear increased as strong upper-level southwesterly flow increased, though in spite of the shear Wilma continued to intensify. This was in part due to the hurricane's track over the Loop Current, an area of warm waters in the southeastern Gulf of Mexico. Early on October 24, Wilma re-attained major hurricane status while located about 120 miles (190 km) west-southwest of Key West, Florida. It gradually became better organized, with the large 50 miles (80 km) eye becoming very distinct on satellite and radar imagery. Wilma was able to retain its strength because large eyes in tropical cyclones are more stable and more resistant to vertical wind shear. Despite wind shear values of about 30 mph (48 km/h), Wilma strengthened further to reach winds of 125 mph (201 km/h). It weakened slightly as it approached Florida, and made landfall at Cape Romano with winds of 120 mph (190 km/h) at around 1030 UTC on October 24.

Hurricane Wilma crossed the Florida peninsula in about 4.5 hours while continuing to accelerate northeastward, and emerged into the Atlantic Ocean as a weakened 110 mph (180 km/h) hurricane near Jupiter. A vigorous cold front associated with the mid-level trough moved across the area to the west of Wilma, yet the cooler and drier air behind the front could not fully penetrate the inner core of the hurricane to weaken it. Shortly after exiting the Florida coastline, Wilma began to re-intensify, believed to be due to a reduction of friction of the eyewall and warm waters of the Gulf Stream. Early on October 25, the hurricane reached a secondary peak intensity of 125 mph (201 km/h) while located about 340 miles (550 km) east of Jacksonville, Florida. During the time, the large circulation of Wilma absorbed the much smaller Tropical Depression Alpha over the Bahamas.

Shortly after its secondary peak intensity, the wind shear, combined with its rapid forward motion of 50 mph (80 km/h), resulted in a steady weakening trend. The overall cloud pattern began to deteriorate, with the eye becoming less distinct and the convection less symmetric. By 1117 UTC on October 25, the center was located to the northwest of the primary convection as cold air from the southwest entrained the circulation. The remaining convection continued to diminish, and by late on October 25 Wilma transitioned into an extratropical cyclone while located about 230 miles (370 km) southeast of Halifax, Nova Scotia, and still at Category 1 intensity. The weakening extratropical remnant turned to the east-northeast before being absorbed by another extratropical storm over Atlantic Canada on October 27.

== See also ==
- Meteorological history of Hurricane Katrina
- Effects of Hurricane Wilma in Mexico
- Effects of Hurricane Wilma in Florida
- List of Florida hurricanes
