= Effects of Hurricane Wilma in Florida =

Hurricane Wilma
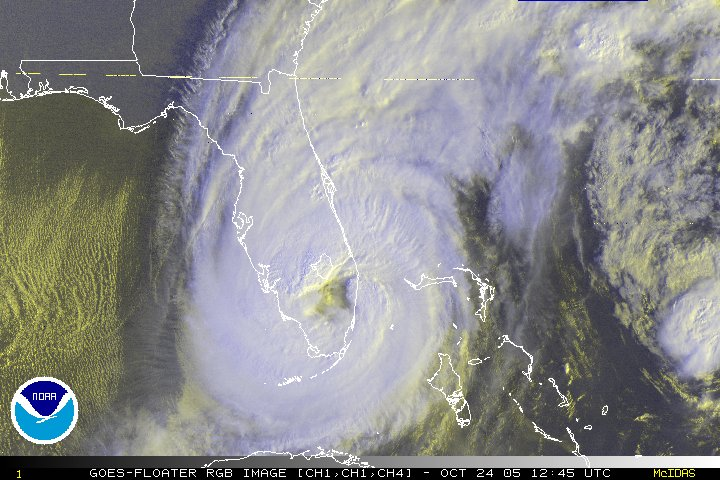
- Hurricane Wilma over Florida on October 24, 2005

Meteorological history
- Duration: October 22–25, 2005

Category 3 major hurricane
- 1-minute sustained (SSHWS/NWS)
- Highest winds: 120 mph (195 km/h)
- Highest gusts: 150 mph (240 km/h)
- Lowest pressure: 950 mbar (hPa); 28.05 inHg

Overall effects
- Fatalities: 30 (5 direct, 25 indirect)
- Damage: $19 billion (2005 USD)
- Areas affected: Florida
- Part of the 2005 Atlantic hurricane season
- History: Meteorological history; Effects: Mexico; Florida; Other wikis: Commons: Wilma images

Hurricane Wilma was one of the costliest tropical cyclones in Florida history. Wilma developed in the Caribbean Sea just southwest of Jamaica on October 15 from a large area of disturbed weather. After reaching tropical storm intensity on October 17 and then hurricane status on October 18, the system underwent explosive intensification, peaking as the strongest tropical cyclone ever recorded in the Atlantic basin. Wilma then slowly weakened while trekking to the northwest and fell to Category 4 intensity by the time it struck the Yucatán Peninsula on October 22. Thereafter, a strong cold front swept the storm northeastward into Florida on October 24, with landfall occurring near Cape Romano as a Category 3 hurricane with winds of 120 mph (190 km/h). Wilma continued rapidly northeastward into the Atlantic Ocean and became extratropical on October 26.

As the system drew closer, Florida governor Jeb Bush declared a state of emergency on October 19. Schools and government offices began closing on the following day. The storm's threat resulted in the postponement of several professional and collegiate sports games. The National Hurricane Center (NHC) issued many tropical cyclone warnings and watches for the state beginning on October 22. Officials ordered evacuations for southwestern Florida and the Florida Keys. However, fewer than 10% of Florida Keys residents complied with evacuation orders. No mandatory evacuations would be ordered for coastal areas of the Miami metropolitan area, though residents residing in low-lying areas and mobile homes were told to evacuate. Over 33,000 people sought refuge at a shelter in Florida.

Much of southern Florida experienced hurricane-force winds, with the strongest surface-height sustained wind speed being a 15-minute average of 92 mph (148 km/h), equivalent to a 1-minute speed of 104 mph (167 km/h), observed in Lake Okeechobee. High winds left approximately 3,241,000 customers of Florida Power & Light without electricity, including roughly 98% of urban southeast Florida. Primarily due to strong winds, agriculture sustained $1.3 billion or more in damage. There was also extensive impact to businesses and dwellings, with 55,000 residences and 3,600 workplaces in Palm Beach County alone reporting some degree of damage. Storm surge also left extensive damage in some parts of the state, especially in the Florida Keys and coastal Collier County. Damage in Florida totaled approximately $19 billion. At least 30 Wilma-related deaths were reported in Florida; five people died directly due to the hurricane's impacts.

== Preparations ==
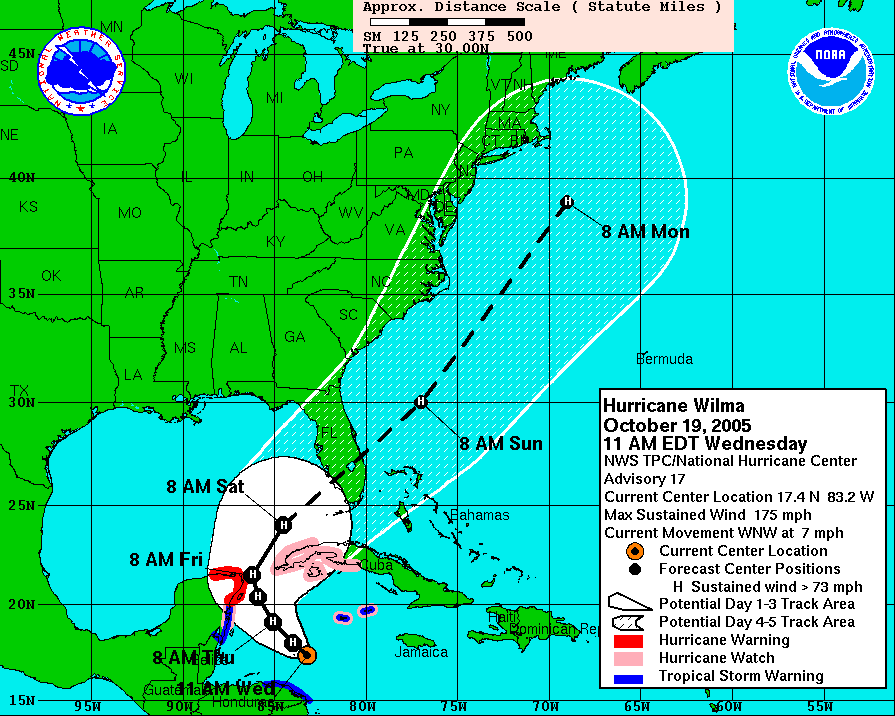
A forecast track for Hurricane Wilma on October 19, which indicated a landfall in Florida on October 22. In actuality, Wilma struck Florida on October 24

The National Hurricane Center (NHC) issued many tropical cyclone warnings and watches in anticipation of Wilma. First, a hurricane watch was posted for the Florida Keys including Dry Tortugas and Florida Bay at 15:00 UTC on October 22. Six hours later, NHC issued another hurricane watch for the west coast of Florida south of Longboat Key and on the east coast of Florida to the south of Titusville, including Lake Okeechobee. At 21:00 UTC on October 23, a tropical storm watch was put into effect on the west coast from Longboat Key northward to the Steinhatchee River and on the east coast from Titusville northward to Fernandina Beach. Early the following day, the hurricane watch was upgraded to a hurricane warning on the west coast and on the east coast from Jupiter Inlet southward, including Lake Okeechobee.

The hurricane warning along the east coast stretching from the Jupiter Inlet southward was expended northward to Titusville at 09:00 UTC on October 23. Simultaneously, the portion of the tropical storm watch from Titusville to Flagler Beach was upgraded to a tropical storm warning. The tropical storm warning was extended further northward to St. Augustine at 03:00 UTC on October 24. Twelve hours later, the tropical storm watch was discontinued from St. Augustine to Fernandina Beach. At 17:00 UTC, the tropical storm warning from Longboat Key to the Steinhatchee River was canceled. The remainder of the hurricane warning in effect was downgraded to a tropical storm warning about 90 minutes later. By 21:00 UTC on October 24, all remaining tropical cyclone warnings and watches were discontinued.

A mandatory evacuation of residents was ordered for the Florida Keys in Monroe County. However, media reports suggested that as many as 80% of residents may have ignored the evacuation order. County offices, schools and courts were closed Monday, October 24. Mandatory evacuations were in effect for all Collier County residents living west or south of US 41. Other areas that were included in the mandatory evacuation were Seagate, Parkshore, The Moorings, Coquina Sands, Olde Naples, Aqualane Shores, Port Royal and Royal Harbour. Hurricane shelters in the area were opened. Curfews were put in place for several cities in Lee and Collier counties.

Florida governor Jeb Bush declared a state of emergency on October 19, allowing the deployment of the Florida National Guard and strategic placement of emergency supplies. A mandatory evacuation of residents was ordered for the Florida Keys in Monroe County and those in Collier County living west or south of U.S. Route 41. County offices, schools and courts were closed October 24. At least 400 Florida Keys evacuated stayed at the Monroe County shelter at Florida International University in Miami-Dade County. As far north as Flagler County, many schools and universities closed for at least one day in anticipation of the storm, including in Southwest Florida and the Miami, Orlando, and Tampa metropolitan areas. Schools in Broward and Palm Beach counties remained closed for two weeks because of extended power outages and some damage to school buildings.

Orange juice futures reached the highest level in six years on Wednesday, October 19, closing up 2.9 cents at $1.118 per pound due to the storm's expected damage to orange trees which would have compounded problems caused the previous year by Hurricanes Charley, Frances and Jeanne. Oil futures also initially rose, closing at $64.36 per barrel on October 17, up $1.73 from the previous day. However, prices began decreasing on October 18, falling by about $1 per barrel, after predictions indicated that Wilma was less likely to impact oil rigs in the Gulf of Mexico.

The NFL moved up its regular-season game between Kansas City Chiefs and Miami Dolphins to 7 p.m. on Friday, October 21 in anticipation of the hurricane. The Chiefs arrived in nearby Fort Lauderdale less than six hours before kickoff. Bob Moore, public relations director for the Chiefs, stated that the NFL initially told him to prepare to host the game at Kansas City or play at a neutral site. However, the NFL informed the team on Thursday morning that the game would be played on the following night at Dolphins Stadium. The NCAA postponed two college football games scheduled in south Florida on Saturday, October 22. Georgia Tech vs. University of Miami was rescheduled for Saturday, November 19 and West Virginia vs South Florida was rescheduled for Saturday, December 3. The NHL rescheduled its Saturday, October 22 regular-season game between the Ottawa Senators and Florida Panthers to Monday, December 5. Due to roof damage caused by Wilma and the loss of power at the BankAtlantic Center, the Panthers also had to postpone their October 29 match up against the Washington Capitals. Furthermore, a concert by the industrial rock band, Nine Inch Nails, expected to have taken place at the BankAtlantic Center on Monday, October 24, was postponed and later canceled. Key West's Fantasy Fest, held around each Halloween, was postponed until December, resulting in only about one-third of the usual attendance figures and a loss of millions of dollars in revenue for hotels, restaurants, and stores. In anticipation of Wilma, all 4 Disney parks planned to be closed all day October 24, but the impact there was minimal, and Epcot and Magic Kingdom reopened at 1pm.

== Impact ==
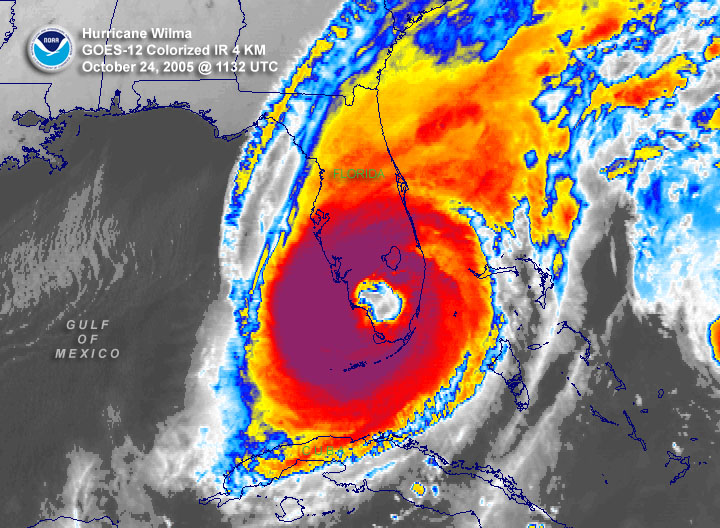
Satellite image of Wilma over South Florida

Wilma's rapid movement across Florida generally limited precipitation to between 3 and 7 in (76 and 178 mm) across a wide area, although the Kennedy Space Center observed 13.26 in (337 mm) of precipitation. Much of southern Florida experienced hurricane-force winds, with Category 2 conditions likely occurring in Broward, northern Miami-Dade, and Palm Beach counties. The highest surface-height sustained wind speed in Florida was a 15-minute average of 92 mph (148 km/h) at an observation site located in Lake Okeechobee, corresponding to a 1-minute average of 104 mph (167 km/h). Much of the Florida Keys experienced 4 to 5 ft (1.2 to 1.5 m) storm surge, with estimates of nearly 9 ft (2.7 m) in the vicinity of Marathon. On the mainland, the highest recorded storm surge values occurred in Collier County, reaching 4 to 8 ft (1.2 to 2.4 m) in height. Wilma spawned ten tornadoes in Florida, with four in Brevard County and one each in Collier, Hardee, Highlands, Indian River, Okeechobee, and Polk counties.

Florida Power & Light (FPL), the largest electricity utility in the state, reported more than 3,241,000 customers had lost power throughout 21 counties – approximately 75% of FPL customers. This represented the largest electrical outage in Florida history, until Hurricane Irma in 2017 caused roughly 6.7 million customers to lose power in the state. Approximately 2.5 million customers lost power in the South Florida metropolitan area, equivalent to about 98% of subscribers. Electrical outages for each customer averaged 5.4 days. Wilma damaged close to 12,400 electrical poles and de-energized 241 substations.

The hurricane caused extensive damage to the agricultural industry, totaling at least $1.3 billion. Nurseries throughout the state experienced close to $554 million in damage, with $454 million incurred to crops and $100 million to structures. Sugar cane suffered approximately $400 million in damage, about $30 million more than the 2004 hurricanes combined. Citrus farmers reported $180 million in damage and a loss of approximately 17% of citrus fruits. Wilma also wrought extensive damage to businesses and housing. In Palm Beach County alone, the hurricane inflicted some degree of structural impact to more than 55,000 homes and 3,600 businesses. An aerial survey by an insurance disaster assessment team reported approximately 70% of businesses and homes suffered at least minor damage in six different municipalities in Broward County. Damage in Florida totaled $19 billion, making Wilma the then-second-costliest hurricane in Florida history, behind Hurricane Andrew in 1992. Wilma was blamed for at least 30 deaths in Florida, of whom five were killed directly by the hurricane's impacts.

=== Monroe County ===
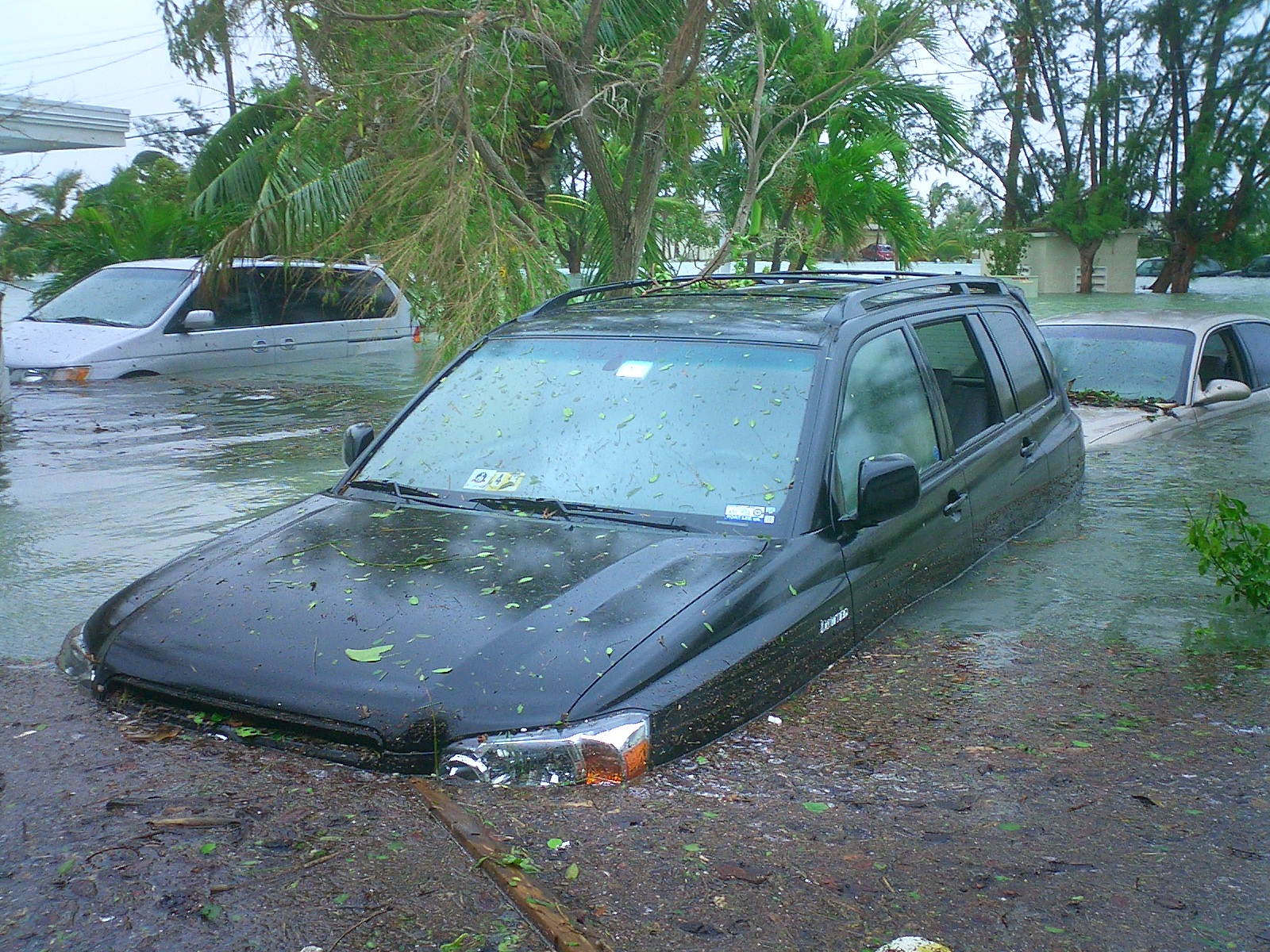
Storm surge from Wilma on Key Haven, island suburb of Key West, Florida.

Wilma caused two storm surge events in the Florida Keys, with the first occurring several hours before the storm's landfall in Florida and the second beginning just after the hurricane struck the state. Storm tide estimates during the first surge included 5–6 ft (1.5–1.8 m) at Key West above mean sea level (MSL), 4–5 ft (1.2–1.5 m) above MSL elsewhere in the lower Florida Keys, 3 ft (0.91 m) above MSL in middle Florida Keys (including Marathon), and 2–3 ft (0.61–0.91 m) above MSL in the upper Florida Keys. The second event was more severe and caused the worst coastal flooding in the Florida Keys since Hurricane Betsy in 1965. Key West recorded a storm tide of 6.5 ft (2.0 m) above MSL in the second event. Estimates elsewhere included tides of 5–8 ft (1.5–2.4 m) above MSL between Boca Chica Key and Big Pine Key, 5–8 ft (1.5–2.4 m) above MSL in the middle Florida Keys, and 4.5 ft (1.4 m) above MSL near Jewfish Creek in Key Largo.

Although the Florida Keys likely experienced hurricane-force winds, the highest observed sustained wind speed was a 2-minute average of 71 mph (114 km/h) at Key West International Airport, though the instrument failed before the strongest winds occurred. Several locations recorded hurricane-force gusts, including a 133 mph (214 km/h) gust at the Fort Jefferson National Monument on Dry Tortugas with an anemometer height at 75 ft (23 m) above MSL. On the inhabited islands, wind gusts peaked at 123 mph (198 km/h) on Cudjoe Key.

Throughout unincorporated areas of Monroe County, the hurricane damaged more than 4,100 single-family residences, 20 of which sustained major damage, and 6 experienced complete destruction. Wilma also damaged roughly 2,500 mobile homes, with 257 suffering substantial impact and 15 being destroyed. About 90 apartment and condominium units received some degree of impact. Hundreds of vessels run aground, including 223 boats counted between Key West and Islamorada by November 11. Storm surge may have damaged as many as 20,000 cars across the Florida Keys. Damage in Monroe County totaled at least $200 million, a figure which excluded unincorporated areas. One indirect death occurred in the county during evacuation.

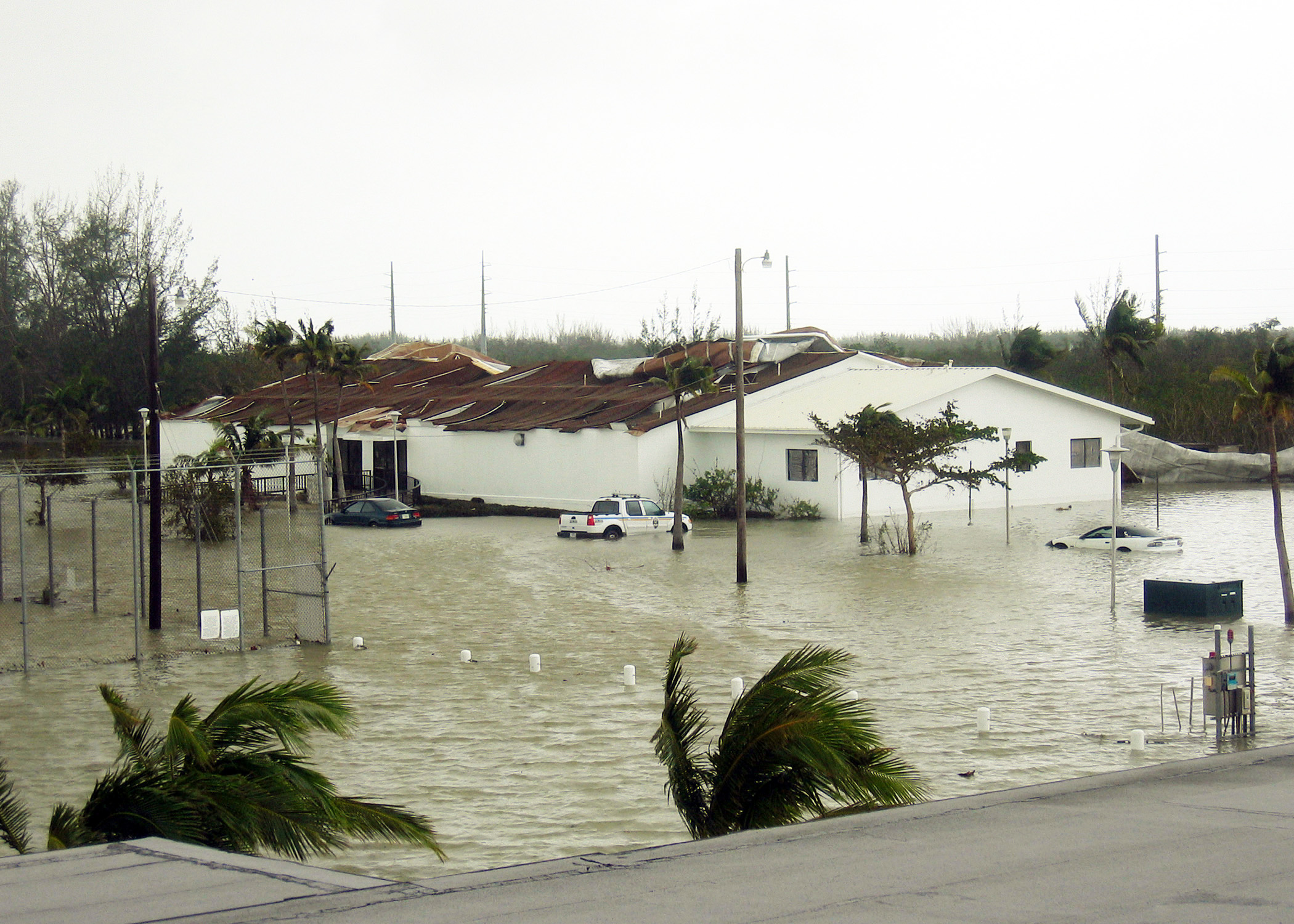
Coastal flooding at Naval Air Station Key West, located on Boca Chica Key

Storm surge and above normal tides caused extensive flooding, especially in the lower Florida Keys, with Key West and the lower Florida Keys inundated with up to 3 ft (0.91 m) of water. High winds and storm surge resulted in major impacts to facilities at Dry Tortugas National Park, with the park office and living quarters experiencing water damage. The storm also destroyed docking facilities and damaged several boats. However, Fort Jefferson suffered no major damage. Approximately 60% of Key West was submerged, with the worst flooding occurring in Bahama Village, Casa Marina, Flagler, Kamien, Southernmost Point, and portions of New Town. Much of the Old Town historic district, with the exception of the waterfront, did not flood due to its elevation being higher than 8 ft (2.4 m) above sea level. Coastal flooding destroyed tens of thousands of cars, with a local newspaper referring to Key West and the lower Keys as a "car graveyard." Approximately 1–2 ft (0.30–0.61 m) of seawater entered many residences, with approximately 690 apartment units, homes, and mobile homes becoming uninhabitable. The city of Key West experienced roughly $100 million in damage.

On the islands between Stock Island and Big Pine Key, most reported major damage to bulkheads, docks, marinas, and concrete seawalls. Storm surge caused moderate to major damage to many homes and workplaces in this section of the Florida Keys. On Boca Chica Key, abnormally high tides destroyed portions of a road at Naval Air Station Key West. Boy Scout Camp Sawyer and Girl Scout Camp Wesumkee, both located on West Summerland Key, reported slight wind and coastal flood affects. On Bahia Honda Key, the Calusa Beach area in particular received storm surge impacts, with two picnic shelters undermined and three others destroyed. Waves also washed sand over the adjacent parking lot and four other picnic shelters. At the Loggerhead and Sandspur beach sections of the park, erosion destroyed beach access walkways and damaged part of a parking lot. Similarly, five concrete picnic shelters at a public beach on Little Duck Key were damaged extensively or beyond repairs.

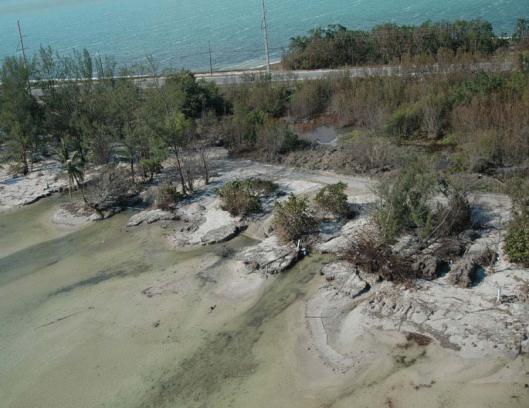
Scour channels created by storm surge at Long Key State Park

Tidal flooding impacted beachfront structures by a minor to moderate degree at Key Colony Beach, while piers at condominiums and resorts were extensively damaged or destroyed. On Boot Key, Fat Deer Key, Stirrup Key, Tingler Island, and Vaca Key – five of the islands which comprise the city of Marathon – fences roofing, siding, signs, shrubs, and trees experienced minor to moderate wind damage. Some structures on the north and south coasts on the five islands suffered coastal flooding impact. The storm damaged much of the infrastructure at the city's public beach. Storm surge also destroyed a seawall, a pier, two poolhouses, and eight mobile homes on Crawl and Grassy keys, while some businesses, dwellings, hotels, and eight seawalls received major water damage. The storm caused damage to the first floor siding of home in Coco Plum Beach and destroyed a pier nearby.

The bayside of Long Key experienced significant coastal flooding, particularly at the west end of the island, where several single-family homes sustained water damage or were undermined by waves. All buildings at the Keys Marine Lab suffered extensive tidal flooding damage. The hurricane destroyed 60 campsites at Long Key State Park. Throughout the islands comprising Islamorada – Tea Table Key, Lower Matecumbe Key, Upper Matecumbe Key, Windley Key and Plantation Key – storm surge left extensive coastal flooding. Waves swept away or severely damaged 36 docks and piers on Plantation Key, 16 on Upper Matecumbe Key, and 8 on Windley Key, while Windley Key reported lesser damage to some docks and piers. On Upper Matecumbe Key, major damage to revetments and close to 300 ft (91 m) of concrete seawalls occurred. Coastal flooding damaged the Islamorada village hall damaged beyond repair, forcing officials to temporarily relocate to the fire station. The islands also experienced light to moderate wind damage.

Most buildings in Key Largo suffered only light wind damage, though one business lost its roof. Storm surge and abnormally high tides flooded several single-family homes on the Florida Bay side of the island, damaged many docks, and destroyed a 100 ft (30 m) concrete seawall in Tavernier. The Monroe County Sheriff's Office closed an 18 mi (29 km) stretch of U.S. Route 1 between Key Largo and Florida City and Card Sound Road due to debris and flooding. The storm also impacted the mainland areas of the county. At Flamingo, a ghost town located in Everglades National Park, many of the facilities were severely damaged, forcing park officials to prohibit camping, lodging, and other services.

=== Southwest Florida ===
==== Collier County ====
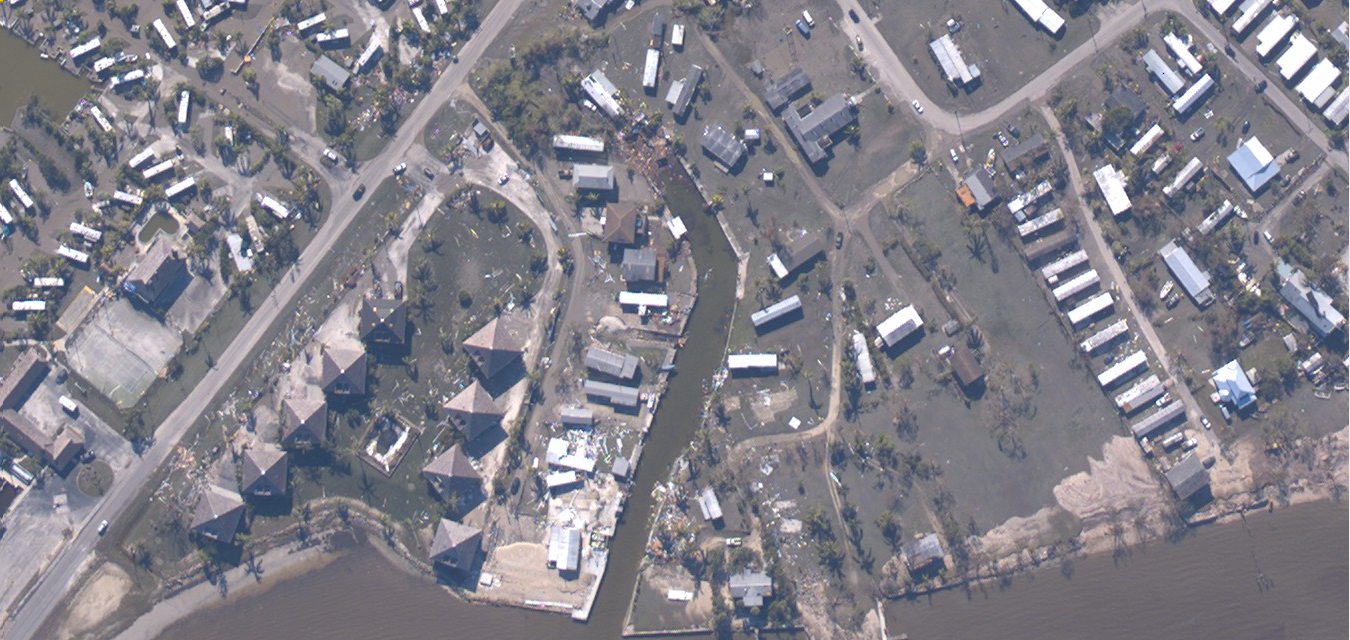
Aerial view of damage in Chokoloskee

The peak of the storm surge in Collier County occurred when the eye of Wilma had already moved inland, with sustained winds in the area being only around 40 mph (64 km/h) at the time. Wilma lashed the coast with storm surge ranging from 4 to 8 ft (1.2 to 2.4 m) in height. Observed sustained winds peaked at 84 mph (135 km/h) and gusts reached 102 mph (164 km/h), with both being measured at a pier in Naples. Nearly 170,000 households lost power, equivalent to approximately 94% of electrical customers in the county. The hurricane left at least seven deaths in the county, two due to heart-disease related complications, one by carbon monoxide poisoning due to improper use of a generator, one after a concrete piling fell on a man, one after a person was struck by a vehicle while removing debris along Interstate 75, one by a roof collapsed onto a woman, and another after an elderly man chose attempted to climb down stairs because a power outage would not allow operation of the elevator at the hotel he was staying at.

Wilma spawned one tornado in Collier County, an F1 tornado near Copeland that caused minor property damage, downed some large trees, and sliced an electrical pole in half. Out of the 170 traffic light signals in Collier County, 130 were destroyed. Throughout Collier County, Wilma damaged more than 16,000 businesses and homes. Approximately 5,000 buildings received damage to at least 20% of their structure, while 394 buildings suffered damage to at least 50% of their structure. Wilma destroyed 8 businesses and 2 homes. A total of 615 mobile homes – approximately 30% of mobile homes in County Collier experienced completion destruction – about one-third of which were located in Immokalee. The storm destroyed at least 50% of orange and grapefruit crops in the county, while a significant loss of sugarcane occurred in the Immokalee area. Thousands of nets for trapping crabs were washed into the Gulf of Mexico. Wilma caused about $1.2 billion in damage in Collier County.

The storm lashed the small community of Chokoloskee with a storm surge about 7 ft (2.1 m) in height and strong winds, destroying approximately 200 recreational vehicles. Storm surge also inundated nearby Everglades City to a depth around 4 ft (1.2 m), covering the city in mud after waters receded. Several docks along the Barron River suffered major impacts. The Old Collier County Courthouse experienced enough damage to its roof and foundation to be condemned. Mobile homes at Chokoloskee, Everglades City, Immokalee, and Plantation Island received substantial damage. At the Ochopee Post Office, the smallest post office in the United States, winds tore shingles off the roof and titled the flagpole to a southwestward angle. Marco Island observed an unofficial wind gust of 134 mph (216 km/h), while a storm surge about 7 ft (2.1 m) in height lashed the coast. Around 80% of residences on the island reported at least minor damage, though a large number suffered major impact and two condominiums became uninhabitable.

In Naples, the airport suffered extensive damage, including impacts to approximately 100 hangars. The storm damaged six major exhibits at the Naples Zoo and the botanical garden, but no animals suffered injuries. Nearly 90 high-rise condominiums in coastal Naples also suffered damage, with some floors completely blown out by high winds. The storm inflicted two condominiums alone with around $135 million in damage. At a condo complex on the south shore of Doctors Pass, 80 units became uninhabitable and the roofs of all 20 buildings required replacement. Overall, damage to buildings in Naples totaled $150 million. A condominium in Pelican Bay also suffered extensive damage. In East Naples, Wilma caused extreme and widespread roof damage to numerous homes.

==== Lee, Hendry, Glades and Highlands counties ====
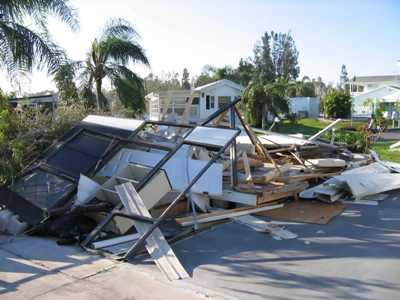
A trailer demolished by Wilma in Lee County

Wilma produced hurricane-force wind gusts in Lee County, with the storm's eyewall moving across the Collier-Lee county line. Page Field near Fort Myers observed a sustained wind speed of 62 mph (100 km/h), while Southwest Florida International Airport recorded a wind gust of 79 mph (127 km/h). Farther south, a C-MAN station at Big Carlos Pass measured sustained winds of 64 mph (103 km/h) and gusts of 87 mph (140 km/h). Approximately 208,000 electrical subscribers lost electricity during the storm. A total of 2,986 homes experienced some degree of damage, with 153 suffering major damage and 14 being potentially destroyed. Additionally, winds damaged 110 businesses, 5 possibly beyond repairs. Insured and uninsured damages throughout the county totaled around $101 million. Damage to county properties totaled close to $4 million. One indirect fatality occurred in Lee County; a power outage caused the death of an oxygen equipment-dependent woman.

A total of 972 homes in Bonita Springs reported minor to major damage, especially manufactured and mobile homes. On Sanibel Island, 128 dwellings suffered some degree of impact, 12 to a major extent. City properties experienced slightly more than $1 million in damage. Impact in Fort Myers was primarily limited to downed trees. Twenty-four homes at Fort Myers Beach received most minor damage. In Cape Coral, Wilma impacted 511 residences; 490 homes reported minor damage, 20 others reported extensive damage, and 1 mobile home was destroyed. Damage to private property totaled roughly $9.2 million. The storm also caused moderate to major damage to 78 businesses and destroyed 1 other workplace.

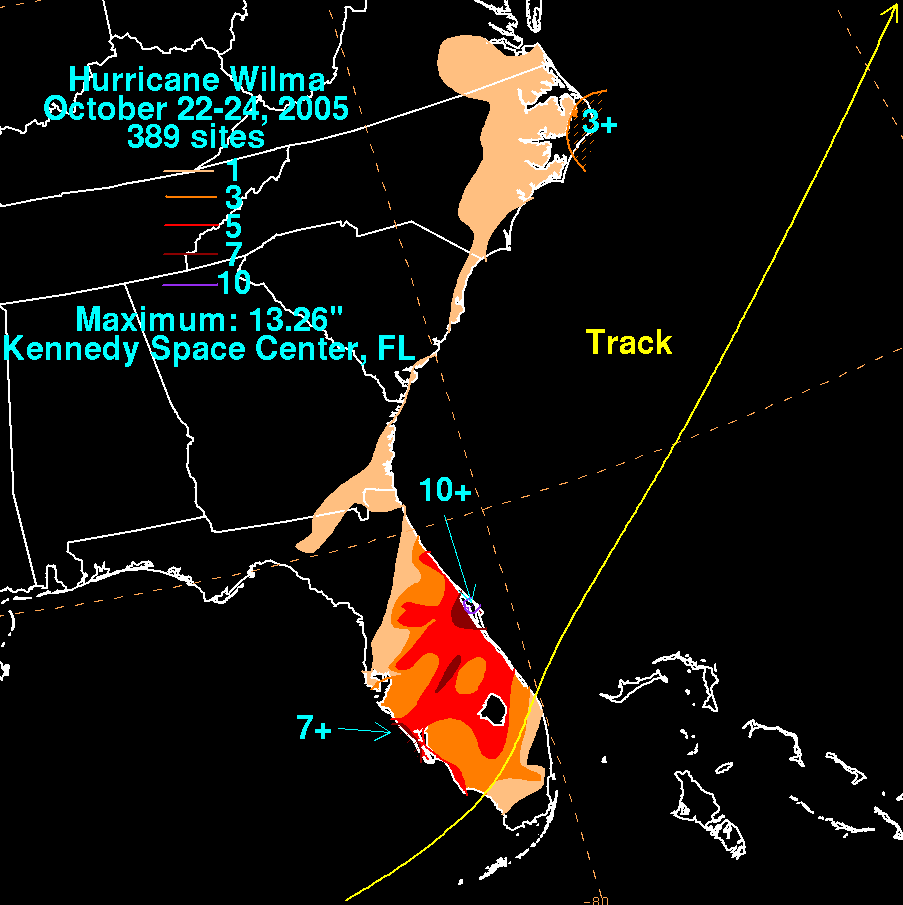
Map of rainfall totals associated with Wilma in the United States

Wilma lashed Hendry County with sustained winds of 75 to 88 mph (121 to 142 km/h). In LaBelle, the municipal airport lost several doors at the hangars and the office was flooded. Additionally, aircraft may have been damaged. A number of roads and a bridge in the city were closed due to debris and downed trees. In Clewiston, some 200‑year‑old trees were toppled and multiple streets flooded, including Route 27. At least 145 dwellings were demolished. Approximately 90 percent of buildings and homes in Clewiston and eastern Hendry County received damage. The cafeteria at Clewiston High School lost much of its roof and water leakage from the ceiling occurred in several classrooms. The Hendry Regional Medical Center sustained roof damage. The city's three marinas were destroyed and a number of boats were impacted by the storm. Numerous businesses in the city suffered some degree of losses. At the US Sugar Corporation headquarters, the roof was severely damaged.

The small, unincorporated communities of Montura Ranch Estates and Pioneer Plantation were also severely effected. In the former, 47 homes were moderately damaged and 9 were left uninhabitable. Forty dwellings were damaged or destroyed in Pioneer Plantation. Roughly 50% of sugar and orange crops destroyed. The main building of the Ah-Tah-Thi-Ki Seminole Indian Museum lost its roof, causing rain to pour into the building and damage some mannequins. At the Big Cypress Indian Reservation, buildings and homes weakened by previous hurricanes suffered further damage. Branches broke from large live oak trees, while porches and sheds lost roofs. Additionally, a shop filled with Native American arts and crafts was destroyed. The hurricane severely damaged 250 homes and destroyed 550 other homes in Hendry County. Throughout the county, damage totaled about $567 million, with $300 million to agriculture and $267 million in structures.

In Glades County, hurricane-force wind gusts left approximately 3,000 people without electricity. Wilma destroyed more than 60 homes. A total of 17 Glades County School District buildings suffered roof damage, totaling around $6.9 million in damage.

Highlands County, Florida experienced Tropical Storm Force winds with some higher gusts to Hurricane Force in the southern part of the county. A few isolated power outages occurred however there was no major damage.

=== Southeast Florida ===
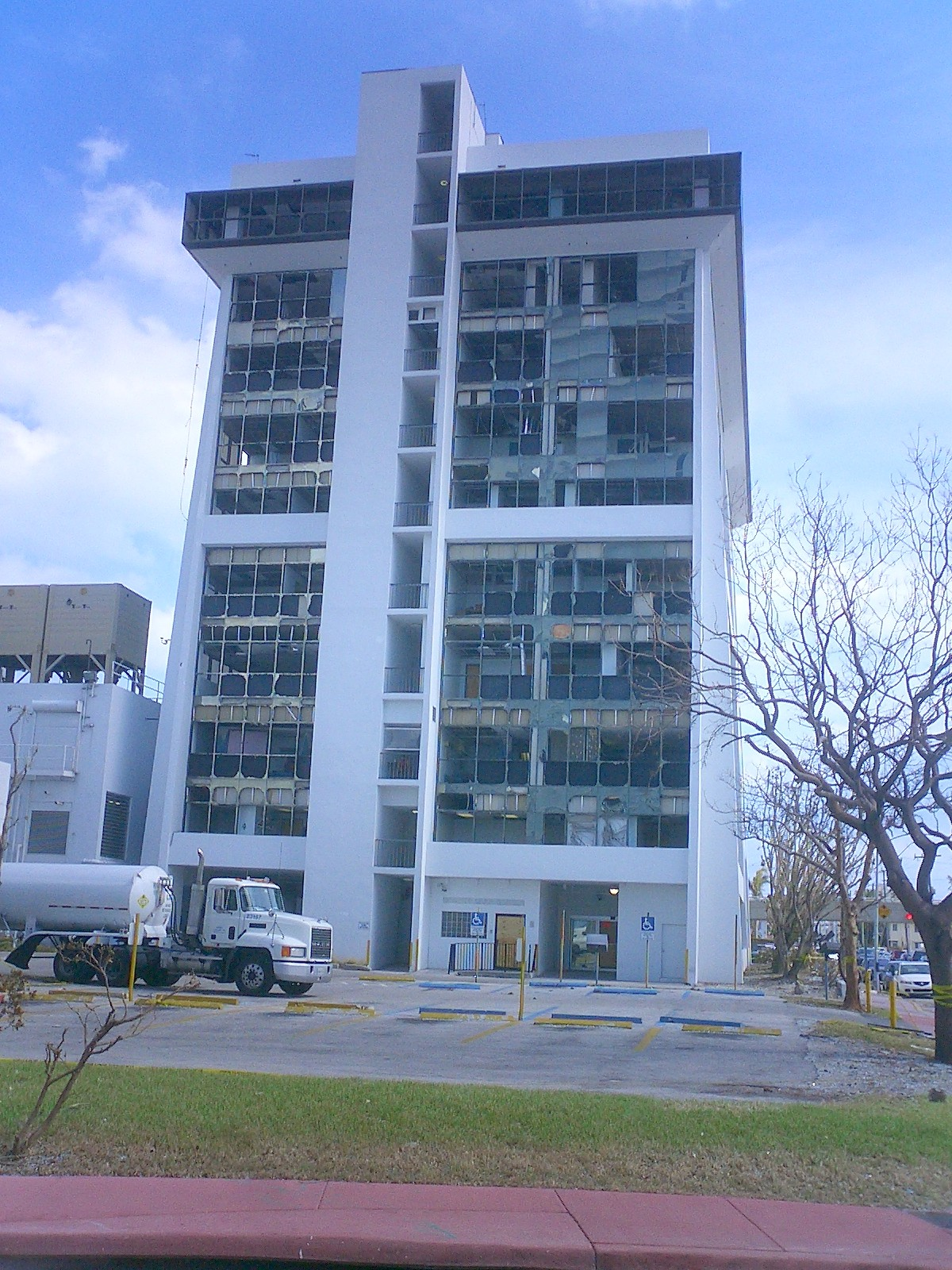
Nearly every window on the west side of South Beach Community Hospital in Miami Beach was blown out.

==== Miami-Dade County ====
Wilma produced hurricane-force winds in Miami-Dade County as well. The Miami-Opa Locka Executive Airport observed sustained winds of 85 mph (137 km/h) and gusts up to 105 mph (169 km/h). Around 956,500 electrical customers lost power at the height of the storm. Agricultural damage in the county reached $222 million. Crop losses compounded those from Hurricane Katrina about two months earlier. Katrina and Wilma combined destroyed approximately 70,000 avocado trees and their fruits. In the other parts of the county, nearly 95% of carambola crops were lost. By November 3, county and municipal officials had tagged 2,059 homes as uninhabitable due to extensive damage or destruction. Out of 327 schools in the Miami-Dade County Public Schools, 181 suffered mostly minor damage. Overall, Wilma left nearly $2 billion in damage in Miami-Dade County.

Twelve deaths occurred in the county, two direct and ten indirect. One direct death occurred in Aventura after a man's boat smashed into a seawall and the other when a man died after his trailer collapsed. A drowning was reported on Maule Lake in North Miami Beach from a capsized boat. Two deaths occurred in Hialeah, one a boy after the car he was in hit a light pole loosened during the storm and the other was a woman who died during a collision at an intersection with no traffic signal. Two additional deaths occurred due to traffic signal outages and two others during repair work. One fatality occurred as a result of carbon monoxide poisoning from a generator being used indoors.

Many condominiums and homes in Aventura reported damage, though only two condo units became uninhabitable. The Northeast-Dade Aventura branch of the Miami-Dade Public Library System experienced enough roof damage to be closed for six months. Early estimates placed the Aventura damage toll between $4.5 million–$6 million. Officials condemned over 100 residences in Sunny Isles Beach, including 3 residential buildings. Nearly 300 vessels suffered damage at the Sunny Isles Marina after the storm demolished a dry storage facility. In North Bay Village, 10 houseboats were declared unsafe. A few buildings were damaged, including the Treasure Bay Clubhouse losing its roof and suffering significant damage on the ground floor. Miami Gardens city code inspectors condemned 19 homes and marked about 10 others as uninhabitable but repairable.

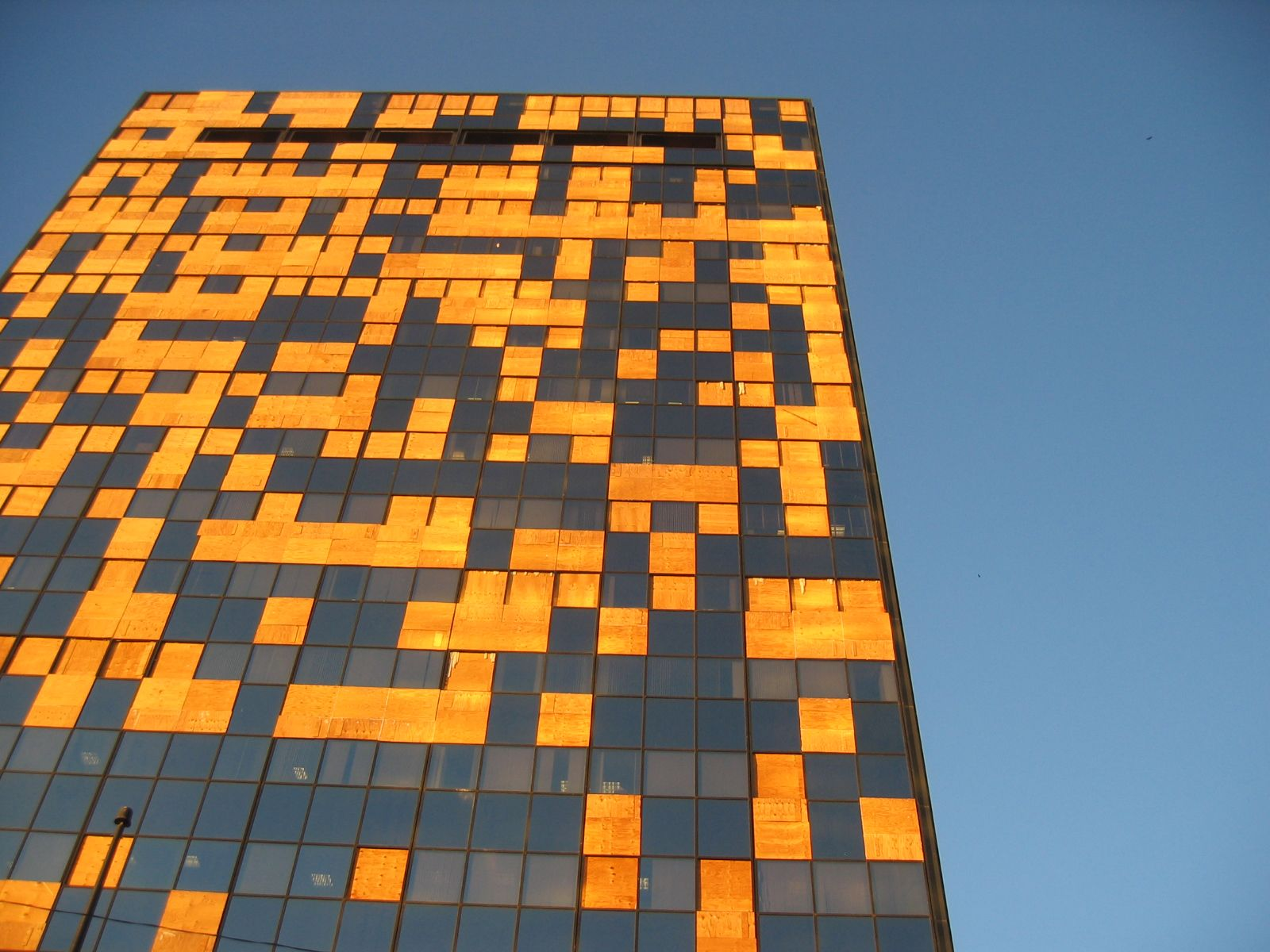
A high rise in Brickell, Miami

Some skyscrapers and high-rises in Miami suffered severe facade damage during the storm, particularly along Brickell Avenue between Route 41 and Coral Way. Among the damaged structures were the Colonial Bank Building, the JW Marriott Miami, Espirito Santo Plaza, and the Four Seasons Hotel Miami, which was the tallest building in Florida. Several hangars at the Miami International Airport were deroofed. The Orange Bowl suffered damage to a radio tower, a chain-link fence, and the light banks. Although there was no structural loss, the impact from the storm rekindled discussion about demolishing the stadium. In the Allapattah and Liberty City neighborhoods, many businesses, churches, and homes experienced major roof damage. PortMiami recorded at least $5 million in damage; impact included damage to 2,000 ft (610 m) of bulkheads, a deroofed cruise terminal, and wreckage at a container yard. At the Miami Seaquarium on Virginia Key, storm surge intruded into the park and caused significant damage. In Miami Beach, the South Beach Community Hospital was severely damaged. Collins Avenue was littered with trees and coconuts, while some other roads were impassable.

A trailer park in Sweetwater, six mobile homes were destroyed and dozens of other suffered damage. In West Kendall, the storm knocked over fences, tore shingles from roofs, uprooted trees, and downed power lines, leaving some without electricity and blocking roads such as Kendall Drive. Similar impact occurred in The Hammocks, with fences, light poles, and trees felled, which blocked some roads. At the Miami MetroZoo (now known as Zoo Miami), roofs and fences were damaged, but the animals were unharmed. The Homestead-Miami Speedway suffered major damage to lights, grandstandings, catch fencing, and garages. One indirect death occurred in Homestead after a man was killed by the tractor he was using to remove debris.

===== Gallery =====
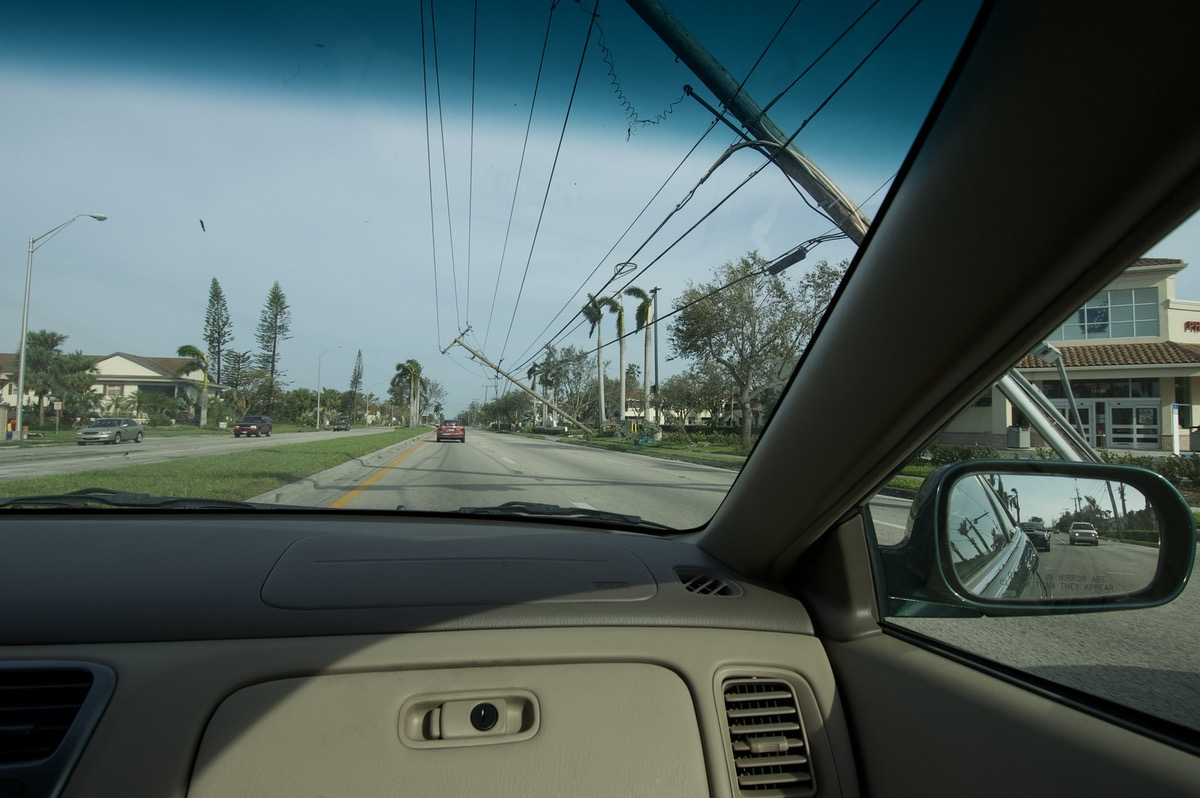
Downed power lines in Miami-Dade County

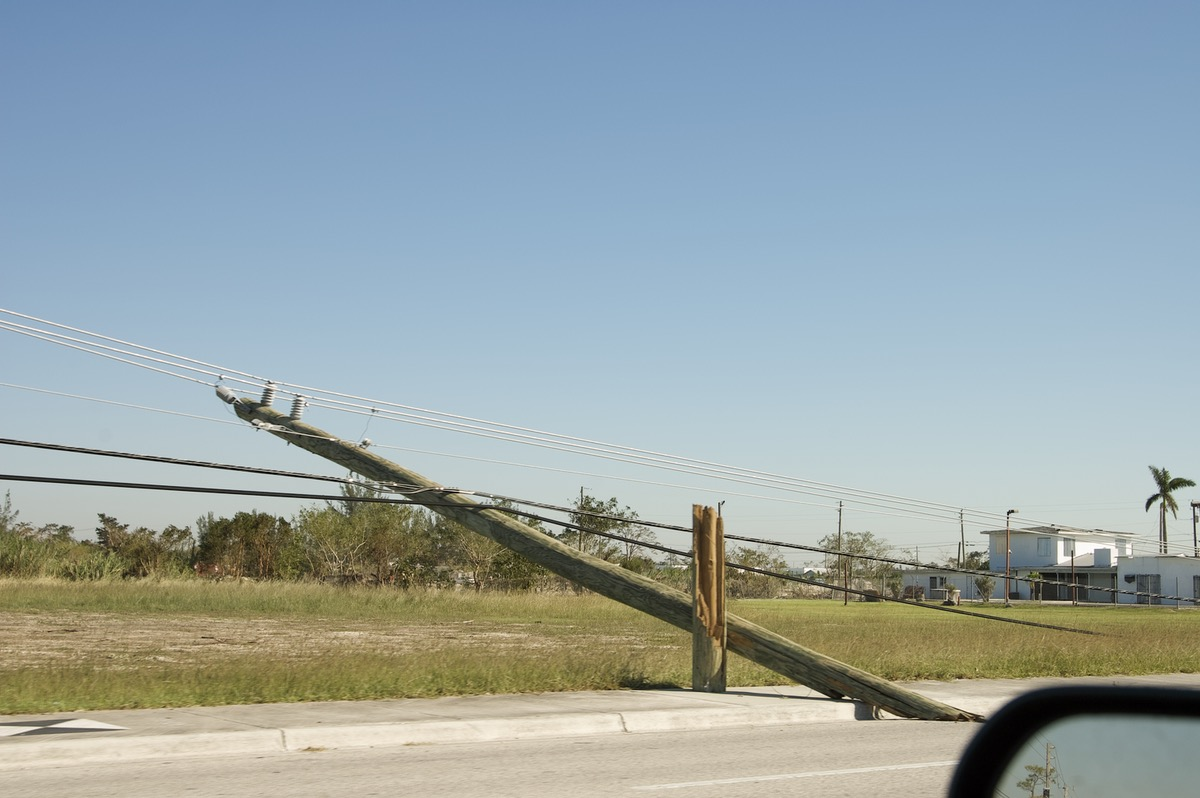
Downed power lines in Miami-Dade County

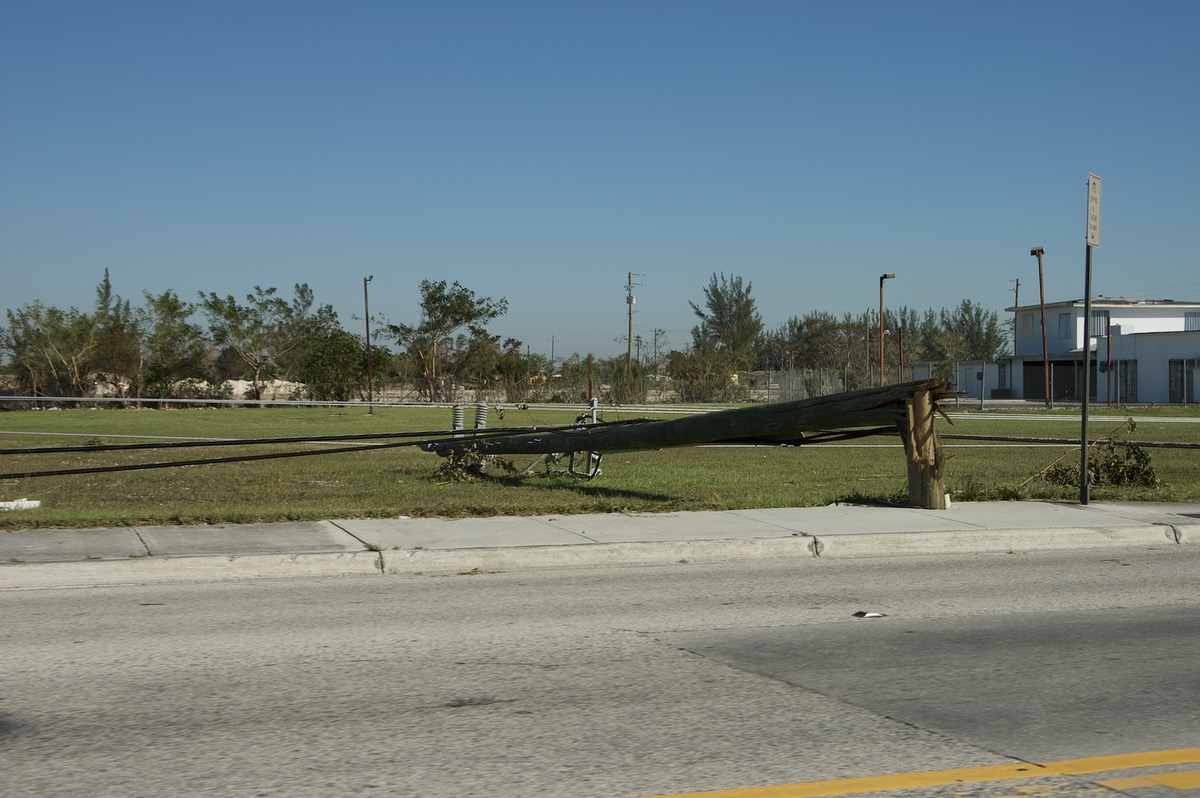
Downed power lines in Miami-Dade County

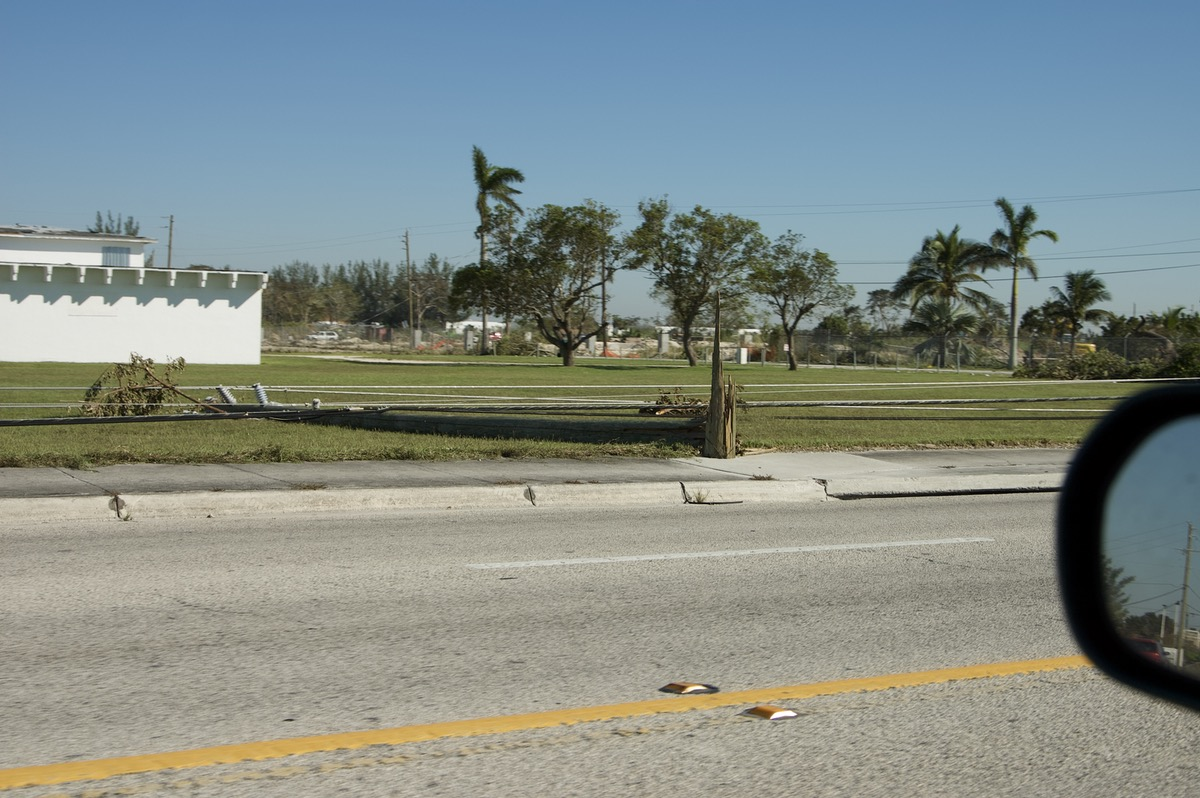
Downed power lines in Miami-Dade County

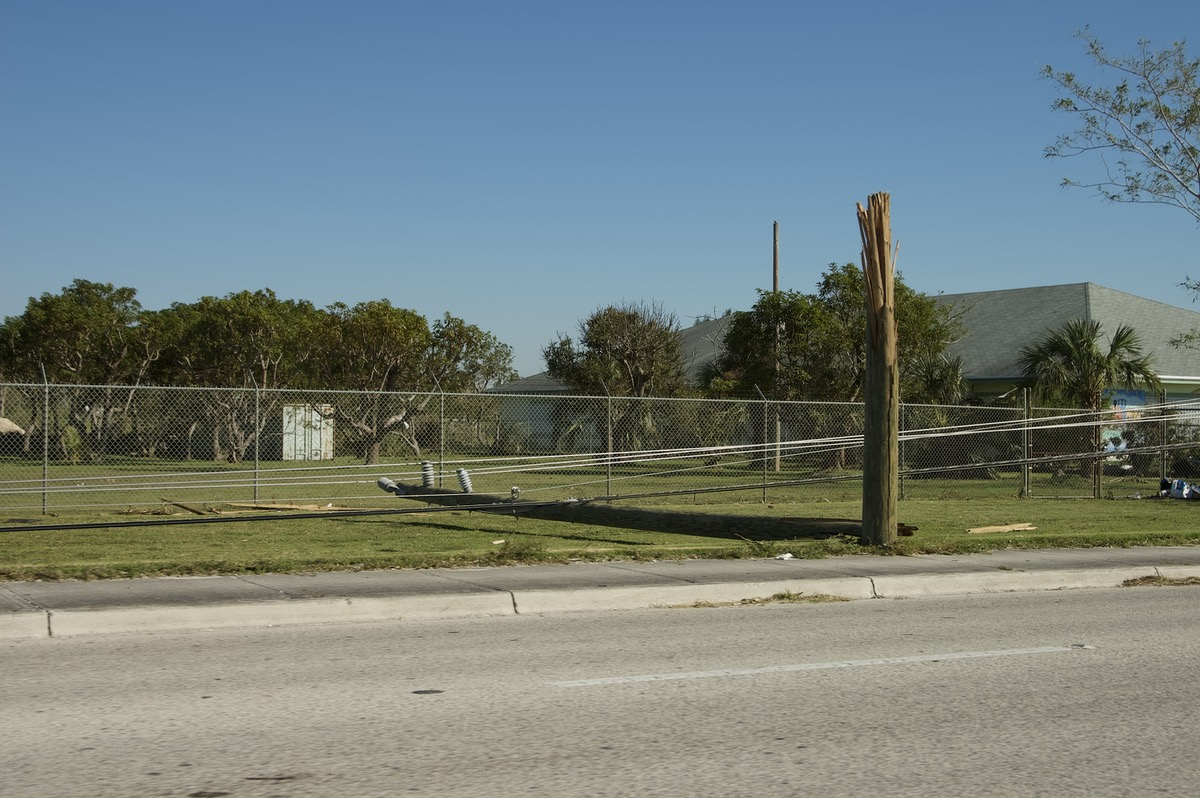
Downed power lines in Miami-Dade County

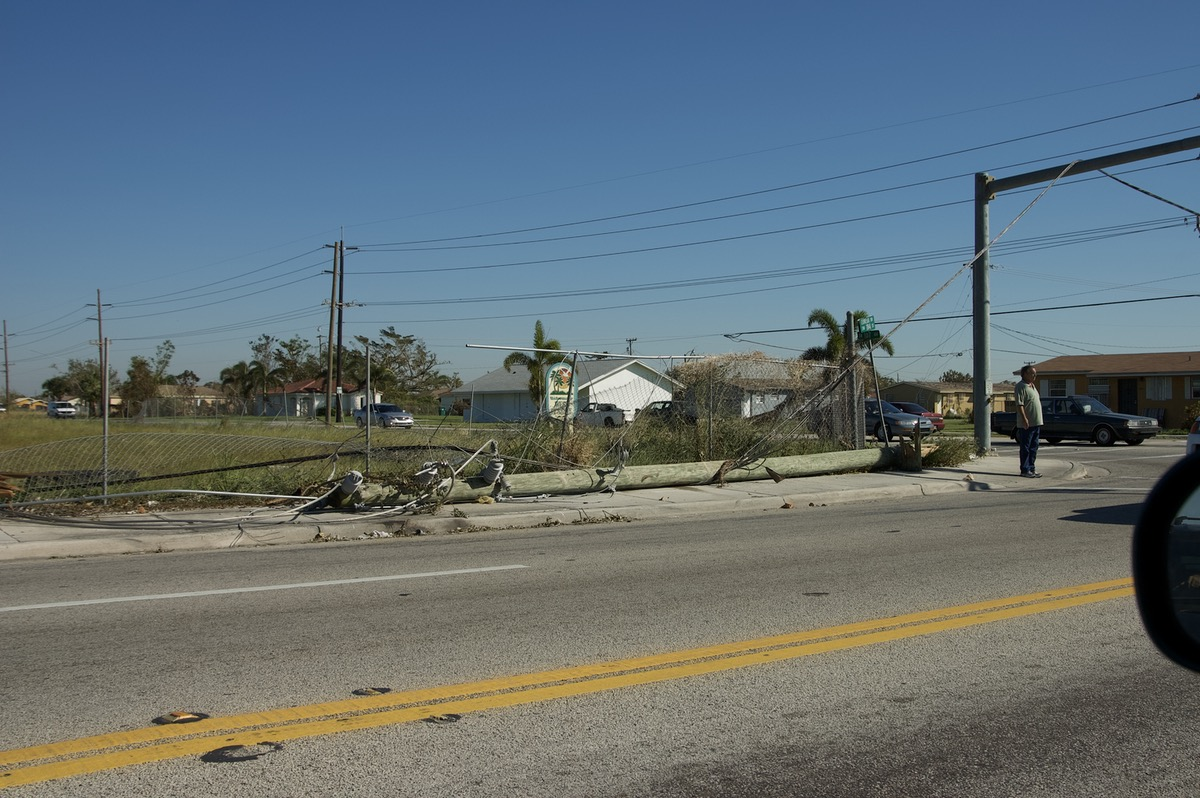
Downed power lines in Miami-Dade County

==== Broward County ====
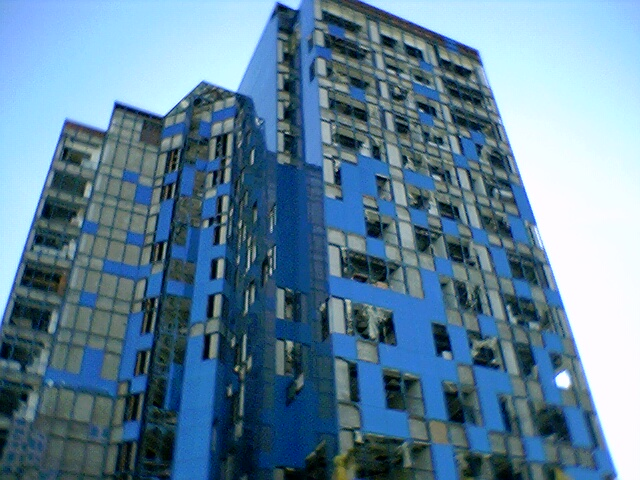
Heavy façade damage to a building in Fort Lauderdale

Estimates indicate that winds between 80 and 100 mph (130 and 160 km/h) lashed Broward County for about five hours, with the highest observed sustained winds being 83 mph (134 km/h) at the Pompano Beach Airpark, while the facility recorded a wind gust of 98 mph (158 km/h) before the anemometer failed. The Fort Lauderdale–Hollywood International Airport measured sustained winds of 70 mph (110 km/h) and gusts up to 99 mph (159 km/h). More than 862,800 Florida Power & Light customers lost electricity. Wilma was the most damaging storm in Broward County since Hurricane King in 1950. Much of the damage was incurred to roofing and siding, while interior damage was caused by rain and winds. Along the Intracoastal Waterway, a number of boats, docks, bulkheads, and dry storage marinas sustained impact, and many houses and businesses suffered roof damage.

According to Broward County's building construction regulatory offices, the hurricane left at least 5,111 dwellings uninhabitable, including 2,800 condominiums and apartments, 1,441 mobile homes, and 42 single-family dwellings. The hurricane also severely damaged or destroyed 170 businesses in the county. The Insurance Disaster Assessment Team estimated that at least 70% of homes and businesses in Coconut Creek, Davie, Margate, North Lauderdale, Plantation, and Sunrise experienced some degree of damage. The storm severely damaged 69 schools, leaving as much as $100 million in damage. Wilma caused approximately $1.2 billion in damage across Broward County. Wilma caused seven deaths in Broward County, two by falling trees and branches and one each by a motorcyclist striking a falling tree, falling off a ladder while cutting tree branches, carbon monoxide poisoning, falling through a 40 ft (12 m) hole in a roof, and electrician getting electrocuted.

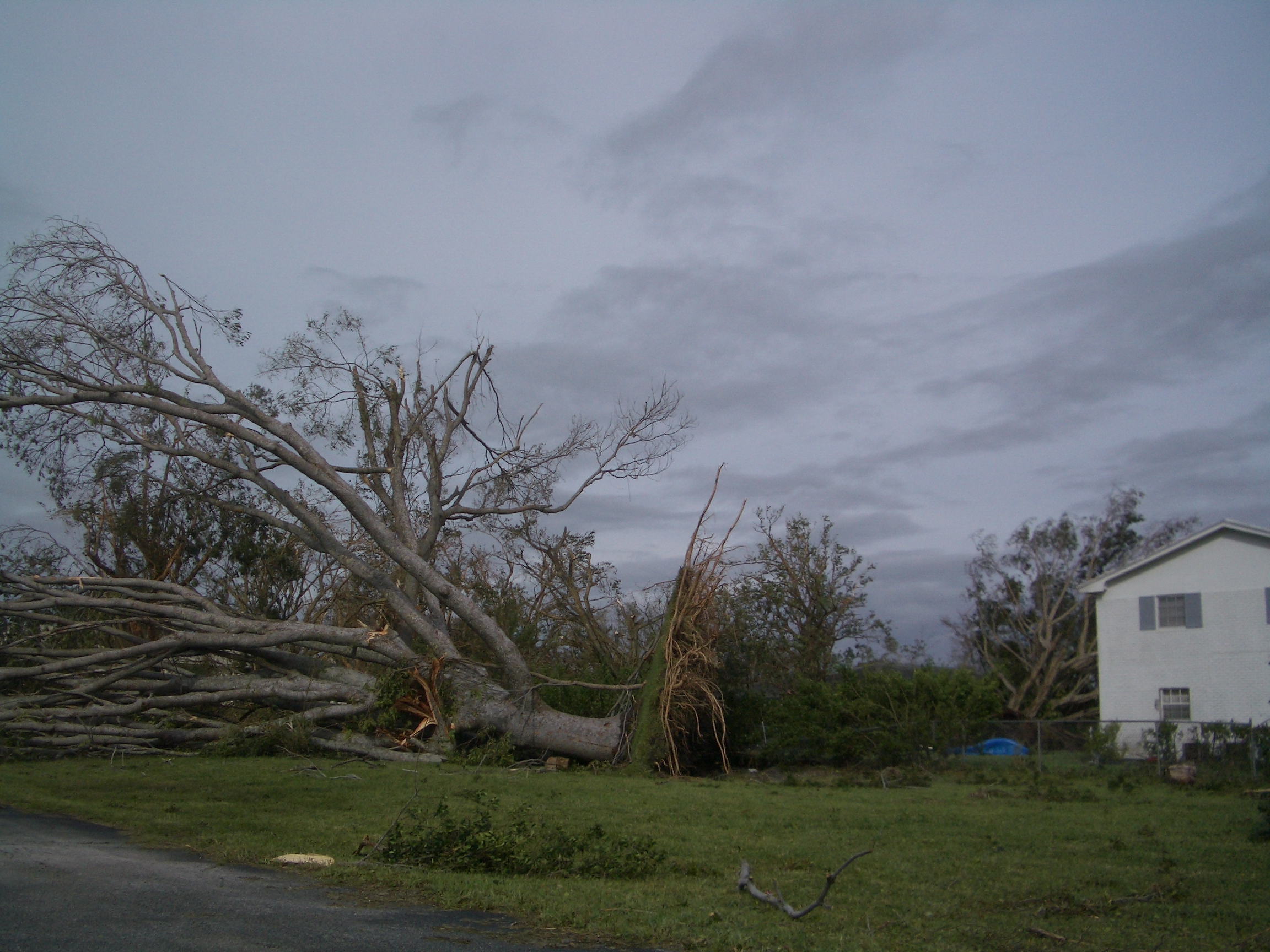
A large tree uprooted in Coral Springs

In Deerfield Beach, sand covered parts of State Road A1A (South Ocean Drive) and reached the second floors of some apartments. Overall, erosion was extensive. At a yacht club along the south side of the Hillsboro Canal, a 40,000 ft (12,000 m) shed sheltering more than 150 boats worth millions of dollars collapsed. About 684 homes were damaged, 100 of which were declared "unsafe". In Lighthouse Point, the storm caused $1.5 million–$2 million in damage, which included cleanup costs. Officials condemned 355 homes in Coconut Creek. At Tradewinds Park, many of the Christmas lights to be used for the Holiday Fantasy of Lights became tangled around trees or were destroyed. Forty-two dwellings, all of them mobile homes, were left uninhabitable in the city. In Parkland, city properties suffered $300,000 to $500,000 in damage. Wilma left 65 homes and businesses in an unsafe condition in Coral Springs.

A total of 40 homes became uninhabitable in Pompano Beach, including 20 mobile homes, 11 commercial buildings, 5 apartment and condo units, and 4 single-family dwellings. In downtown Fort Lauderdale, several highrise office buildings suffered extensive damage, including One Financial Plaza, AutoNation Tower, Broward Financial Center, the Broward County Administration Building, the 14-floor Broward County School Board building, and the Broward County Courthouse.

In Plantation, 93 buildings sustained major damage. Three single-family dwellings were severely damaged and 16 mobile homes were destroyed in Hollywood. Moderate beach erosion at John U. Lloyd Beach State Park. At Camp Seminole in Davie, the storm caused over $1 million in damage to trees, buildings, and other infrastructure. The camp was closed for several years and underwent repairs, re-opening as Camp Elmore in June 2012. A total of 608 trailers, 46 single-family homes, and 38 town homes were rendered uninhabitable, while one business was left in disrepair. Damage in the town alone was approximately $103 million, which included at least $60,000 to municipal buildings and around $150,000 to parks.

==== Palm Beach County ====
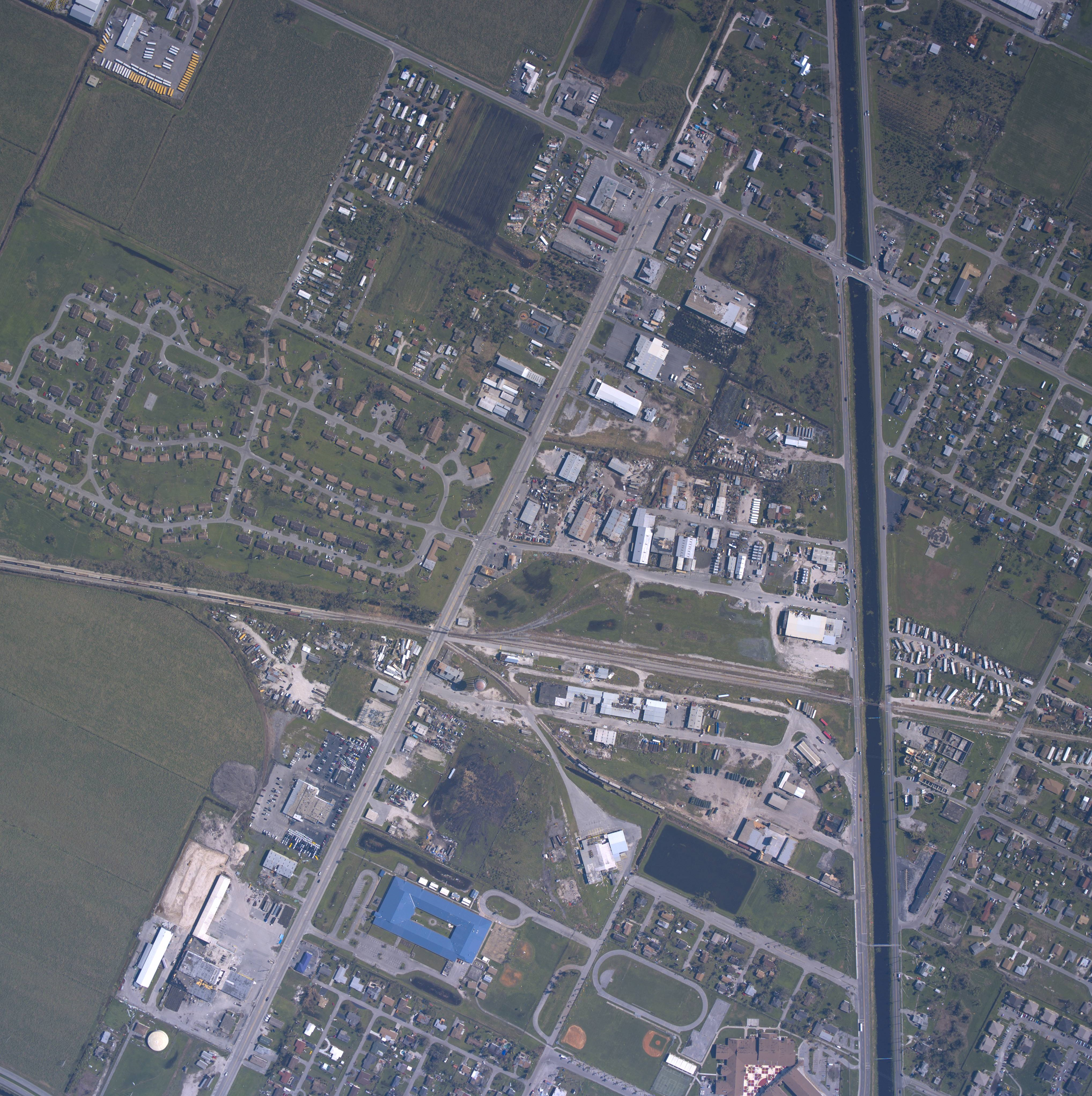
An aerial view of Belle Glade after Wilma

In Palm Beach County, more than 90% of Florida Power & Light customers were left without electricity. Most schools in the county had extensive roof and building damage, resulting in an estimated $35.7 million in damage. Also, power failure left schools closed for two weeks. The storm inflicted some degree of damage to more than 55,000 homes and 3,600 businesses. A total of 7.7 million cubic yards of debris was collected after the storm. Overall, Wilma left at least $2.9 billion in damage in Palm Beach County, with $1.6 billion to residential property, $1 billion to businesses, and over $300 million to municipal property. Unincorporated areas of the county suffered about $1.67 billion in damage. Additionally, there was $13 million in damage to parks and $32 million to public infrastructure. A total of six fatalities were attributed to Hurricane Wilma in Palm Beach County.

Belle Glade recorded the strongest wind gust in Florida, reaching 117 mph (188 km/h) at the South Florida Water Management District office. Trees, tree limbs, and power lines were downed in the city. The storm destroyed marinas around Lake Okeechobee. Several boats, vehicles, and adjacent buildings were smashed. At least 53 vessels were beached. Damage to Glades General Hospital necessitated the evacuation of patients. The fire station was deroofed, forcing firefighters to relocate to Lakeshore Middle School. Throughout the city, 526 homes suffered damage, while 72 homes were demolished. Further north, the fishing industry in Pahokee was effectively destroyed after the newly built marina collapsed. The storm also wrecked 172 homes and impacted 487 others. Damage in Pahokee reached at least $41 million, with $1 million to municipal buildings and $40 million to homes.

At Lake Harbor, a tiny lakefront community near the western boundary of Palm Beach County, only seven homes were left standing after the hurricane. About 743 homes – roughly 80% of dwellings in South Bay – were damaged, and 63 residences were destroyed. The city hall and the fire station suffered heavy roof damage. In Canal Point, trees, branches, power lines, and electrical poles were toppled. Several other homes and buildings were inflicted with serious damage. Overall, damage occurred at about 60% of homes in Canal Point, including the almost complete destruction of mobile home parks. Some historical buildings damaged by hurricanes Frances and Jeanne in 2004 were destroyed by Wilma. State Road 80 (Southern Boulevard) was closed after transmission line fell across the highway about 1 mi (1.6 km) west of Lion Country Safari. At the Loxahatchee National Wildlife Refuge, 85% of tree islands were damaged by the storm, with the worst effects occurring to larger trees and tree islands near the center of the refuge. The office and visitor centers were both severely damaged and later rebuilt.

A man in Loxahatchee died after a falling tree pinned him to the windshield of his vehicle. The metal roof at Western Pines Middle School was peeled back, exposing multiple classrooms. A total of 331 homes were structurally impacted in Royal Palm Beach. Damage there reached about $9 million, including about $1.5 million to village property. In ,Wellington, the community center nearly lost its roof, the bleachers around the pool collapsed, and fences and canopies surrounding the tennis courts were destroyed. A few local parks experienced similar effects to their bleachers and sports facilities. At Palm Beach Central High School, the kitchen and cafeteria lost portions of their roof, the theater and media center were flooded, the gym suffered a roof leak, and trees, signs, and fences were knocked down throughout campus. Many trees and utility poles were snapped at The Mall at Wellington Green. Approximately 3,955 homes were impacted and 4 others destroyed. Overall, Wellington suffered almost $62 million in damage, with $50.4 million to property, and $3.8 million to public facilities, with repairs costs reaching almost $5.9 million.

Jonathan Dickinson State Park's Missile Tracking Annex in Tequesta observed a sustained wind speed of 82 mph (132 km/h) and a gust of 114 mph (183 km/h). Throughout the village, trees and tree branches littered the streets. A condominium was evacuated after an air conditioner was detached from the roof, resulting in water damage. The recreation center, water treatment plant, and public safety building all experienced roof damage and water intrusion. Ninety-five homes and twenty-six businesses in the city suffered mostly minor damage. Overall, damage in the village reached about $5.2 million. In Jupiter, the storm brought similar impact to public facilities, parks, and roads. However, dwellings fared much worse, with 2,673 damaged and 14 destroyed. At Riverbend Park, Wilma downed many trees and caused minor damage to several chickee huts. The damage toll for the town of Jupiter was over $23.3 million. In Jupiter Farms, the police substation, originally owned by Burt Reynolds, was inflicted extensive impact both on the interior and exterior. The roof, the air conditioning system, and several walls were damaged. State Road 706 (Indiantown Road) was blocked due to a downed power line and overflowing culverts. Low-lying areas experienced minor flooding.

Municipalities of Palm Beach County: 1. Pahokee / 2. Belle Glade / 3. South Bay; 4. Tequesta / 5. Jupiter Inlet Colony / 6. Jupiter; 7. Juno Beach / 8. Palm Beach Gardens / 9. North Palm Beach; 10. Lake Park / 11. Riviera Beach / 12. Palm Beach Shores; 13. Mangonia Park / 14. Palm Beach / 15. West Palm Beach; 16. Haverhill / 17. Glen Ridge / 18. Cloud Lake; 19. Palm Springs / 20. Lake Clarke Shores / 21. Royal Palm Beach; 22. Wellington / 23. Greenacres / 24. Atlantis; 25. Lake Worth / 26. South Palm Beach / 27. Lantana; 28. Manalapan / 29. Hypoluxo / 30. Boynton Beach; 31. Ocean Ridge / 32. Golf / 33. Briny Breezes; 34. Gulf Stream / 35. Delray Beach / 36. Highland Beach; 37. Boca Raton / 38. Loxahatchee Groves

In Juno Beach, several commercial and business properties were damaged, including two shopping centers on U.S. Route 1, a One-Stop store, and a community clubhouse. A number of beach walkovers and signs were damaged, while many trees were toppled at a park. Twelve houses received structurally impacts, with one being completely demolished. Total damage in Juno Beach reached around $1.48 million. Several public facilities in Palm Beach Gardens were impacted by the storm. At a baseball field and a separate sports complex, bleachers, lights, and trees were downed. Five fire stations suffered damage to their roofs and equipment. City hall experienced damage to its roof and air-conditioning system. About 3,481 dwellings were inflicted damage to some degree, while 12 others were destroyed. The suffered about $30.1 million in damage. Several commercial and public properties were damaged in North Palm Beach, while 35 homes received structural impacts. Overall, the village experienced about $3.1 million in damage.

In Lake Park, several businesses and a public works building on State Road 811 (10th Street) were extensively damaged. There was also light damage to the roof of the town hall and at the Lake Park Marina. Additionally, 279 homes were structurally impacted, 46 severely. Two parks had a number of downed lights, fences, trees, and benches. Damage in Lake Park totaled about $9.7 million. The Wells Recreation Center and the Ocean Mall in Riviera Beach both suffered extensive damage. The latter was to be condemned, but was later rebuilt. Severe impact to housing occurred in the city, with 1,191 homes damaged and 4 destroyed. Damage in Riviera Beach approached $18.4 million. In Palm Beach Shores, the roof of a restaurant and 41 homes suffered structural impact during the storm. Damage in the city was light, totaling about $670,000. One person died of carbon monoxide poisoning in Mangonia Park. The Ande Monofilament headquarters suffered severe damage, while a total of 41 homes received minor impact. The town received only about $1.17 million in damage.

Sustained hurricane-force winds and gusts up to 101 mph (163 km/h) lashed West Palm Beach. In downtown West Palm Beach, a large construction crane fell and broke water and gas lines, causing water and gas to spew into the streets. The Comeau Building lost some windows and a section of its roof. Debris from the roof littered Clematis Street and crushed a parked car. The Palm Beach County Courthouse and Board of County Commissioners buildings suffered only broken windows. A portion of the roof at the police department was peeled off. At city hall, windows were broken and four out of the five floors sustained damage. A total of 20 city-owned buildings were impacted structurally, with an overall loss of about $12.3 million. At the Carefree Theatre, a theatre that screened foreign films and hosted small concerts, suffered extensive roof damage. A roof leak at St. Mary's Medical Center forced staff to evacuate patients to other rooms. The 1515 Tower, which was abandoned due to heavy impact by hurricanes Frances and Jeanne in 2004, suffered further damage during Wilma. Along the Intracoastal Waterway, many boats capsized or crashed into the seawall. On U.S. Route 1 between Belvedere Road and State Road 80 (Southern Boulevard), several stores in the Antique Row section had broken windows, interior damage, and rain-soaked merchandise.

The gymnasium of Forst Hill High School, which was serving as a shelter, had a portion of the roof torn-off and rain began to pour in. At the South Florida Fairgrounds some of the metal sidings were shredded off the Americraft Expo Center, while severel buildings were damaged at Yesteryear Village, an open-air historic park. Twenty-eight of the fifty exhibits at the Palm Beach Zoo were damaged, three beyond repairs. There was also serious impact to the carousel and veterinarian hospital. Many trees were downed and much of the vegetation was ruined. The zoo alone suffered about $1.5 million in damage. At Okeeheelee Park, the roofs of multiple buildings were removed at the equestrian center, which was under construction at the time. Hurricane Frances, Jeanne, and Wilma combined toppled over 70% of trees at Mounts Botanical Garden, while Wilma itself damaged the office buildings. Throughout West Palm Beach, 1,194 businesses suffered minor damage and 105 others experienced severe impact, while one was obliterated. Additionally, 6,036 homes received impact from the storm, while 16 were completely demolished. Damage in the city reached approximately $425.8 million, with almost two-thirds of the total to businesses.

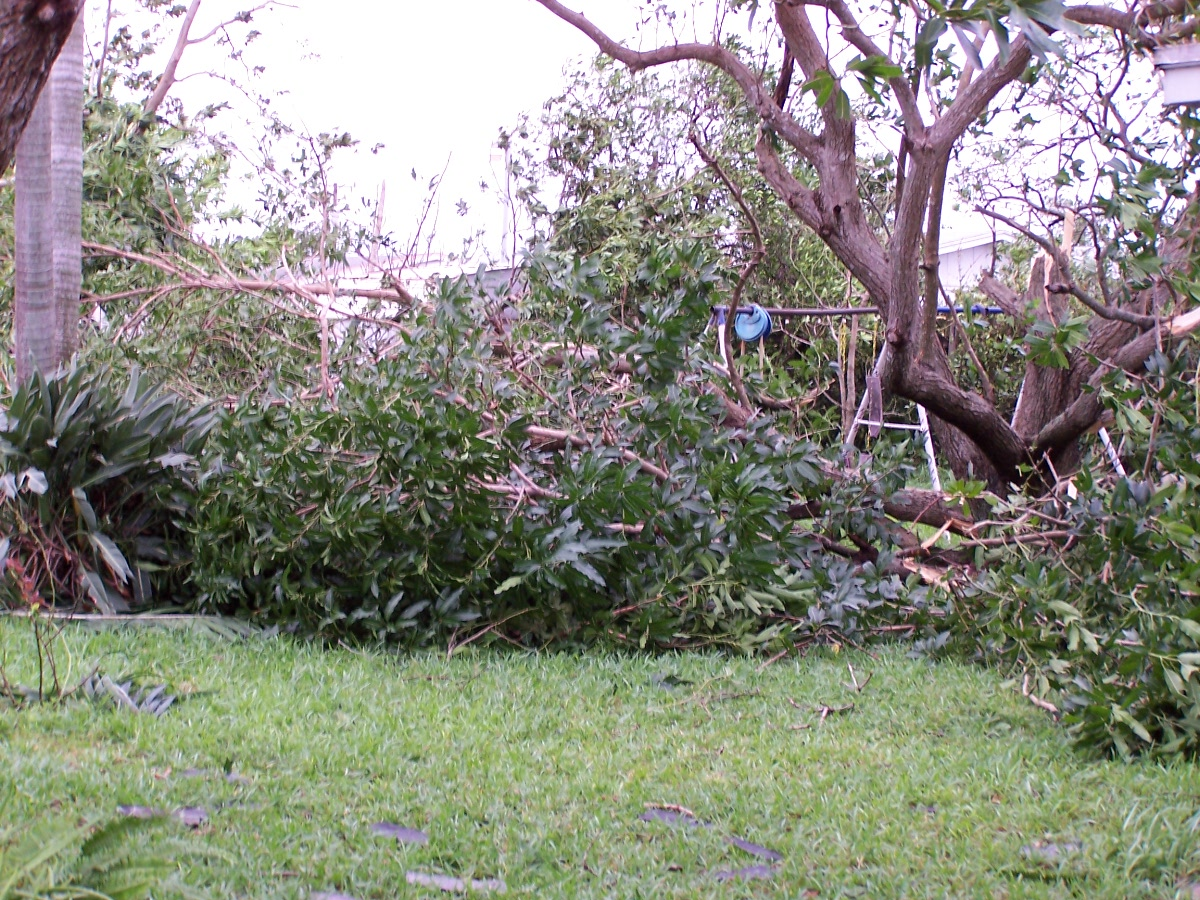
Tree damage at a home in Palm Springs

In Palm Beach, damage was primarily limited to roofs, vegetation, and windows, mostly in the southern end of town. A man suffered a fatal heart attack around the time he was struck by a sliding glass door. A total of 51 homes in the town experienced damage. Overall, damage in Palm Beach was approximately $9.4 million. A wind gust of 105 mph (169 km/h) was observed in Greenacres. Several roadways were blocked in the city due to falling trees. Two buildings at an apartment complex were evacuated after they began to lean. About 627 residences were impacted and 19 others obliterated. The roofs of two buildings at John I. Leonard High School suffered heavy damage. Overall, damage to homes and businesses reach about $18 million. In Palm Springs, 2,462 homes were inflicted some impact, including severe damage to 460 multi-family dwellings, while 5 residences were demolished. The village reported about $6.1 million in damage.

The sixth floor of JFK Medical Center in Atlantis was partially removed, causing staff to move 34 patients to lower floors. Wilma also damaged nine homes in the city. In Lake Worth, the hurricane destroyed the sanctuary of a church on State Road 802 (Lake Avenue). The Lake Worth Playhouse lost a portion of its roof then rain poured in, flooding the dressing room and damaging sound and light equipment. At Palm Beach Community College's Lake Worth campus, several windows at the library shattered and then rain poured in, destroying about 1,000 books. A senior citizen high-rise known as the Lake Worth Towers suffered roof damage. A senior-living facility at Haverhill Road and Lantana Road lost most of its roof. About 27 homes were destroyed and 2,491 homes suffered structural impact, while 7 businesses were demolished and 93 others were damaged. Damage in Lake Worth amounted to $28.3 million.

In Lantana, the Old Key Lime House lost its tin roof. The restaurant's older section, constructed in 1889, remained mostly unscathed. About 261 dwellings in the city were impacted and 4 others were destroyed. Additionally, a church lost its steeple and the Solid Waste Authority transfer station suffered extensive roof damage. In Hypoluxo, most of a mobile homes at a trailer park were damaged, 12 of which were condemned. Overall, 204 residences were affected by Wilma. In South Palm Beach, high-rise condominiums experienced extensive damage. Throughout the town, 429 dwellings were impacted. In Manalapan, about 166 residences experienced structural losses. The town hall and public safety buildings in Ocean Ridge suffered severe damaged. The storm inflicted damage on a total of 364 homes in the town. In Briny Breezes, two Quonset huts, the clubhouse, the auditorium, and 495 mobile homes – approximately 80% – were damaged. Overall, damage in the town totaled about $2.84 million.

In Boynton Beach, several schools received damage, mainly limited to downed trees, fences, and signs, as well as missing roof tiles and broken windows, though a few schools were damaged more severely. Fallen utility poles blocked the entrance to a gated community and one fell onto Interstate 95. A number of businesses and residences were effected, with 896 homes damaged and 56 destroyed. The roof of a Sam's Club crumpled and landed at Interstate 95 and Hypoluxo Road. Three deaths occurred in Boynton Beach, one from a falling sliding glass door, another due to a collision at an intersection with the traffic lights out of service, and the third from a boy touching a downed power line. Throughout the city, Wilma left approximately $100 million in damage. A total of 58 homes were damaged in Gulf Stream. The storm left approximately $1.5 million in damage in Gulf Stream, with $1 million to private property and business and $500,000 to the town's infrastructure. In Highland Beach, between 50 and 55 residential units had broken windows, while at least 40 suffered roof damage. A total of 372 dwellings were impacted by the storm. Damage was minor, reaching only about $35,000.

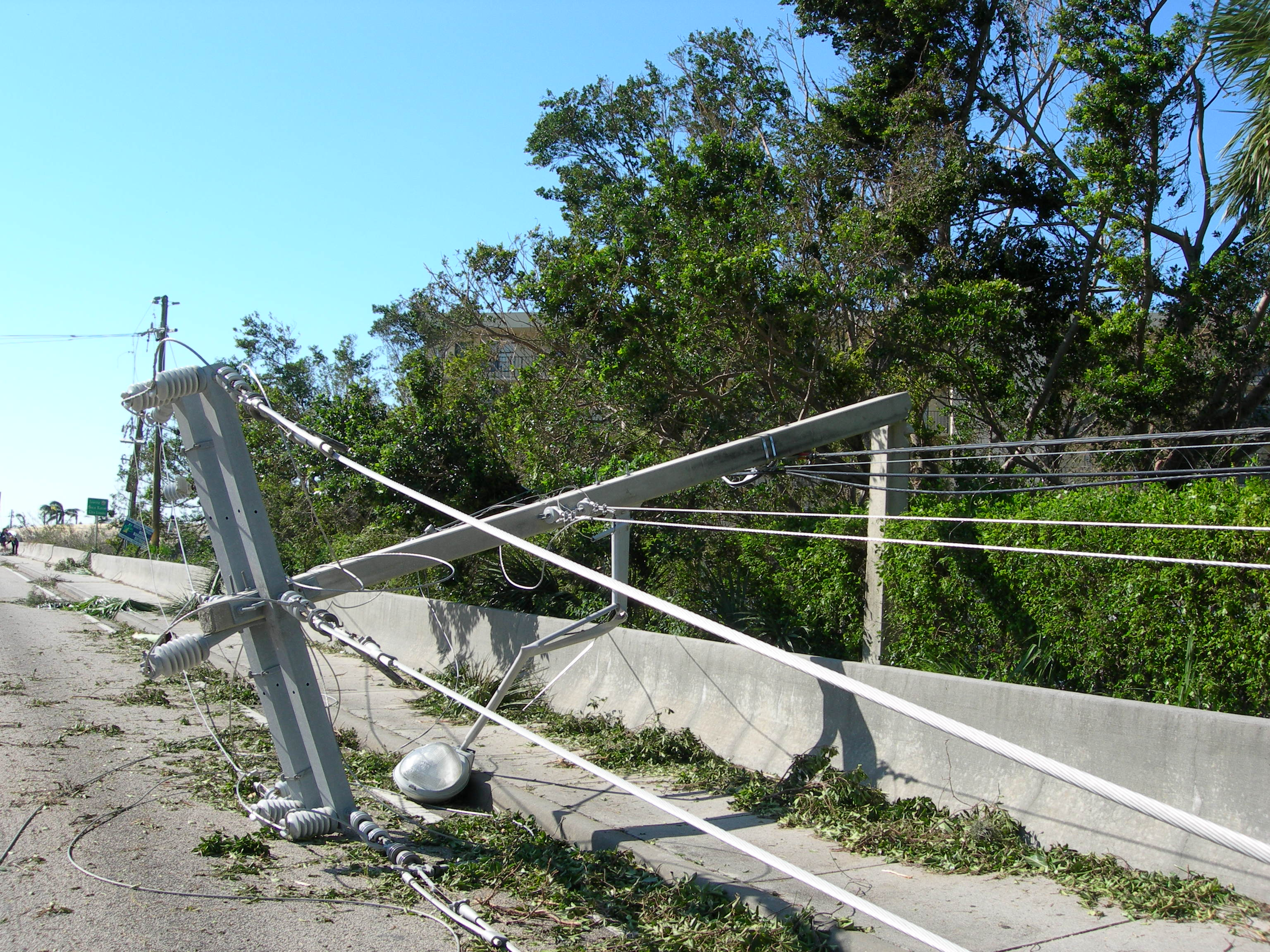
Snapped concrete electrical poles in Boca Raton

Delray Beach's city hall experienced some interior and roof damage after a 30-ton air-conditioning unit detached from the building. The doors to the ports at a local fire station were ripped off and subsequently replaced. A portion of the roof at Old School Square was lost, while minor ceiling damage occurred at several city parks. At the tennis center, trees, fences, and cabanas were knocked over. Several trees and the modern romantic garden at the Morikami Museum and Japanese Gardens were destroyed, while the museum and café complex suffered roof damage. Similar impacts occurred at the American Orchid Society Visitors Center and Botanical Garden, which was closed to the public for about one month. Wilma effected 917 homes, 79 of which were completely wrecked. The roof of a condominium was blown off and broke into pieces. Overall, damage in Delray Beach was estimated at between $100 million and $150 million, with $8 million to public buildings.

In Boca Raton, the Boca Raton Airport suffered extensive damage, totaling almost $12 milion and including the collapse of two hangars, planes that had flipped over, and hangar doors which had blown in.. At Spanish River High School, two masonry block walls of the school's $8.6 million theater were ripped apart. An elementary school almost completely lost its roof. Additionally, the gymnasium at Florida Atlantic University suffered severe roof damage. The Boca Raton News suspended publication for almost a week due to damage and lack of electricity at its headquarters. The West Boca Medical Center was structurally damaged and the steeple of a church collapsed. Twenty-five businesses were destroyed, while several along Northwest Second Avenue sustained roof damage. About 1,889 homes in the city suffered losses, while the demolition of 8 others occurred. Damage in the city alone total approximately $60.8 million.

=== Elsewhere ===
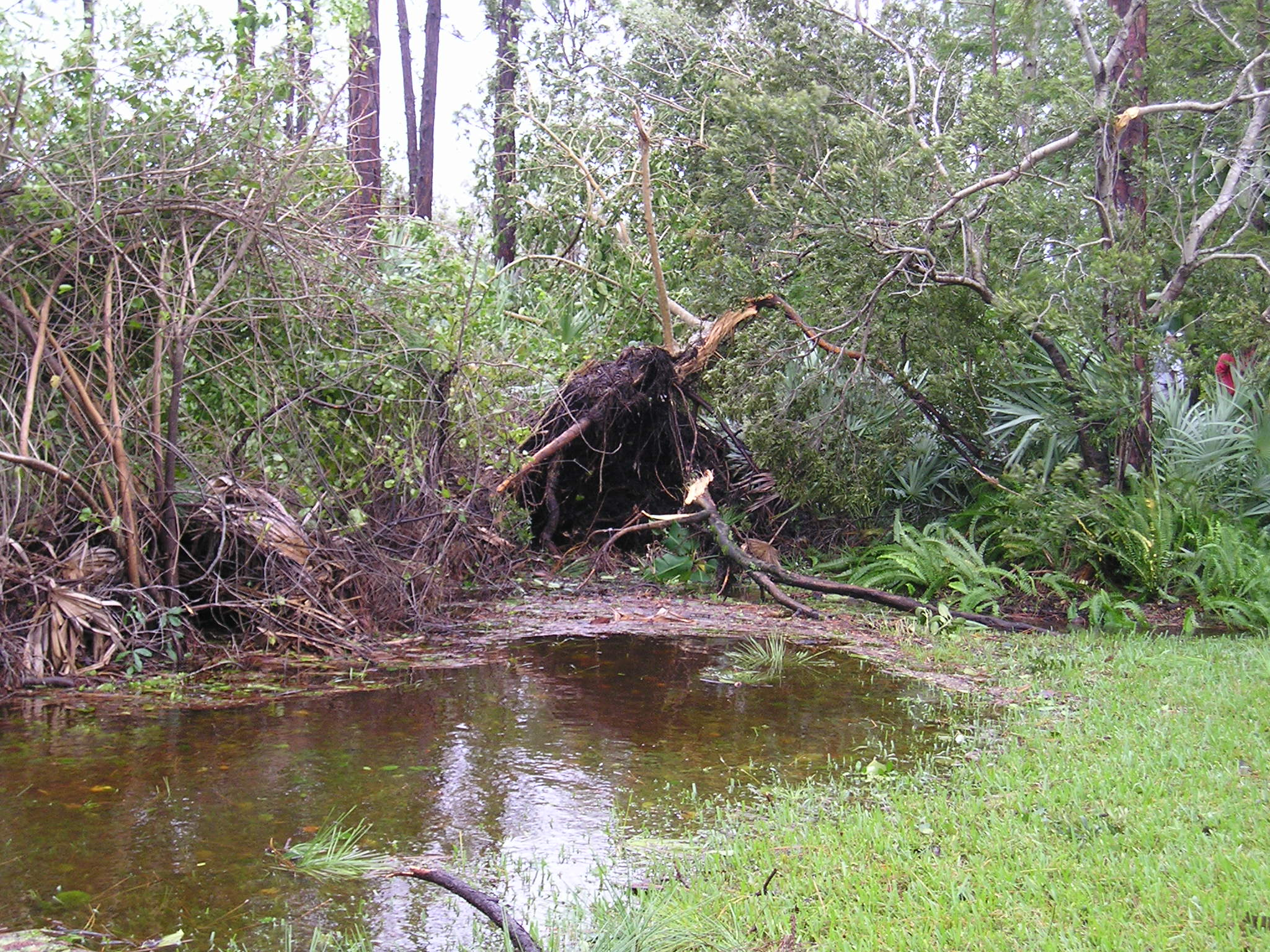
Several trees were uprooted and low-land areas flooded in Palm City, Florida

Wind gusts up to 108 mph (174 km/h) in Hobe Sound resulted in widespread wind damage. Forty-eight residences were destroyed and 120 suffered significant damage, most of which were mobile homes. Over 90% of the county was left without electricity. The county's main hospital, Martin Memorial, sustained enough damage to be unable to receive new patients. Damage to agriculture reached about $48 million. In St. Lucie County, winds destroyed two mobile homes, severely damaged Tradition Field, and deroofed the county Civic Center. Otherwise, winds mainly downed trees and power lines. Losses to vegetation totaled $28 million. Two deaths occurred in St. Lucie County, both in Fort Pierce. One was a man who collapsed during clean-up efforts and the other was a woman who was in a car accident caused by an out of service traffic light.

Strong winds gusts up to 80 mph (130 km/h) in Okeechobee County impacted about 800 residences, with 29 of those destroyed and 114 others receiving major damage. Winds also overturned two airplanes, and destroyed three hangars and severely damaged two others at Okeechobee County Airport. About 50 covered boat slips were destroyed and 12 boats were damaged or sunk. In the city of Okeechobee, the water plant was shut down due to poor water quality in the lake. Two tornadoes touched down in the county, though neither damaged anything other than trees.

The rainfall in Osceola County led to the flooding of twelve homes in St. Cloud and the destruction of one mobile home in Kissimmee, while winds inflicted minor damage to numerous dwelling and mobile homes, primarily to the awnings and porches. Wind gusts up to 55 mph (89 km/h) in Indian River County left minor damage to trees, power lines, roofs, and out buildings. The county EOC was damaged after a communication tower was blown down. Agricultural losses to vegetables, citrus and sugar totaled about $20 million. A tornado spawned 10 mi (16 km) east of Yeehaw Junction downed trees along State Road 60. In Volusia County, a roof and a home under construction were severely damaged in Daytona Beach Shores. Throughout the county, a few power lines and trees were downed.

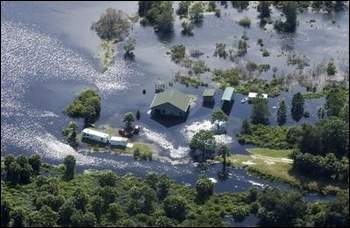
Flooding in Cocoa West

In Brevard County, winds downed trees and power lines and caused some damage to roofs and out buildings. Parts of the county experienced 10 to 13 in (250 to 330 mm) of rain, flooding about 200 homes in Cocoa. Crop damage totaled about $3 million. Six tornadoes touched-down in the county. The first tornado, which effected Cocoa and Rockledge, destroyed a porch at a restaurant and damaged the roof of an apartment building. It also destroyed transformers along State Road 520 after crossing the Intracoastal Waterway. The next tornado was spawned near Melbourne Beach and removed the second floor of beachfront house. The third tornado damaged trees and power lines in Palm Bay. A fourth tornado in West Melbourne destroyed a large portion of an apartment roof, flipped-over a car and damaged two others. It also felled fences and trees. The fifth tornado, spawned in Floridana Beach, destroyed a home along State Road A1A and littered the home's debris across that roadway. The sixth and final tornado damaged an apartment complex in Melbourne near the intersection of Route 192 and John Rodes Boulevard.

Damage in Charlotte, DeSoto, Hardee, Hernando, Highlands, Hillsborough, Manatee, Pasco, Pinellas, and Polk counties was minor, collectively totaling approximately $2.45 million. Between 4 and 8 in (100 and 200 mm) of rain in Charlotte County resulted in swollen ditches and inundated streets, including a portion of State Road 31. In Highlands County, up to 6 in (150 mm) of precipitation flooded parts of U.S. Route 98. A tornado that touched down along the shore of Lake Josephine destroyed a porch and a shed. Heavy rainfall ranging from 6 to 8 in (150 to 200 mm) in Polk County flooded a few homes in the city of Lake Wales. A tornado spawned in Mulberry destroyed a transformer and sent several people to a local shelter. Another tornado was reported in Hardee County near Zolfo Springs. In Hillsborough County, a man died from a heart attack while uploading sandbags in preparation of the hurricane.

Impact in Alachua, Citrus, Columbia, Dixie, Jefferson, Lafayette, Lake, Marion, Orange, Putnam, Seminole, Sumter, Suwannee, Taylor, and Wakulla counties, was mainly limited to light to heavy rainfall and some power outages, which were restored by the following morning. The outer bands of the storm produced 3 to 5 in (76 to 127 mm) of precipitation to Flagler and southern St. Johns counties. In the former, some flooding of roadways was reported. One indirect death occurred in St. Johns County after a woman was killed in a car accident while evacuating. Portions of the Florida Panhandle received large waves from Wilma prior to its landfall, with Alligator Point, Cape San Blas, Dog Island, and St. George Island experiencing minor beach erosion. The Cape St. George Light, built in 1852, suffered damage from many previous tropical cyclones, before Wilma finally toppled it into the Gulf of Mexico.

== Aftermath ==
On the same day as the passage of Hurricane Wilma, President of the United States George W. Bush issued a major disaster declaration for Brevard, Broward, Collier, Glades, Hendry, Indian River, Lee, Martin, Miami-Dade, Monroe, Okeechobee, Palm Beach, and Saint Lucie counties, allowing residents to receive assistance. A total of 587,228 residents applied for aid via the Federal Emergency Management Agency (FEMA), which exceeded any of the four significant hurricanes in Florida in 2004 – Charley, Frances, Ivan, and Jeanne. Ultimately, FEMA expended $342.5 million to the 227,321 approved applicants. The agency paid out $150.8 million for housing and $191.5 million for other significant disaster-related needs, including loss of personal property, moving and storage, and medical or funeral expenses relating to the hurricane. Additionally, public assistance from FEMA totaled over $1.4 billion and grants for hazard mitigation projects exceeded $141.5 million. FEMA operated up to 41 Disaster Recovery Centers (DRCs) at once, which provided information to citizens about how to obtain relief via the state or federal government or volunteer organizations such as the American Red Cross. Federal aid also came from the Small Business Administration, which approved about $101.4 million in low-interest loans for businesses and homes. Inspectors completed 418,625 damage assessments. Additionally, the Blue Roof Program, conducted by the United States Army Corps of Engineers, installed more than 42,000 temporary roofs.

Florida governor Jeb Bush activated an emergency bridge loan program in early November 2005, allowing small businesses damaged by Wilma to apply for interest-free loans up to $25,000. The Florida legislature took several actions in the 2006 session in relation to Wilma. These included allocating $66.7 million to improving shelters, mandating that high-rise buildings have at least one elevator capable of operating by generator, and requiring gas stations and convenience stores to possess a back-up electrical supply in the event that they have fuel but no power.

Florida's sugar industry was greatly affected; the cropping had already started and had to be halted indefinitely. Damage to sugarcane crops was critical and widespread. Citrus canker spread rapidly throughout southern Florida following Hurricane Wilma, creating further hardships on an already stressed citrus economy due to damage from Wilma and previous years' hurricanes. Citrus production estimates fell to a low of 158 million boxes for the 2005–2006 production seasons from a high of 240 million for 2003–2004. Forecasts projected a decrease of 28 million boxes of oranges, the smallest crop since the 1989-1990 growing season, caused by a severe freeze.

More than 20 days later, some residents and business owners remained without electric service. Cable television and internet services as well as cell phone services were unavailable for up to two months in some areas. Power outages in southeastern Florida, notably in Miami-Dade, Broward, and Palm Beach counties, compounded the difficulties South Floridians faced following Wilma. Any traffic lights still standing were not working, causing an increase in traffic problems. Gasoline was in high demand for cars and generators; six-hour waits were common, due to lack of power to pump the fuel. Much of Miami-Dade, Broward, and Palm Beach counties were placed under a boil water order. Communication was also difficult—land lines were damaged, while cellular towers were either damaged, without power, or overloaded in capacity.

By late-September 2010, roughly $9.2 billion had been paid for more than 1 million insurance claims that had been filed throughout Florida in relation to Hurricane Wilma.

== See also ==
- List of Florida hurricanes (2000–present)
- Hurricane Wilma
