= Lake Josephine =

Lake Josephine or Josephine Lake may refer to:

- Josephine Lake (Thunder Bay District), Ontario
- Josephine Lake (Manitoulin District), Ontario
- Josephine Lake (Algoma District), Ontario
- Josephine Lake (Sudbury District), Ontario
- Lake Josephine (Florida), a natural freshwater lake in Highlands County, Florida
- Lake Josephine (Ramsey County, Minnesota)
- Lake Josephine (Montana), a natural freshwater lake in Glacier National Park, Montana (elev. 4882 feet)
- Josephine Lake (Montana), a freshwater lake in Montana (elev. 5174 feet)
- Lake Josephine (Western Australia), a lake of Western Australia

== See also ==
- Josephine Lake, in the Alpine Lakes Wilderness, Washington
