= Brickell Arch =

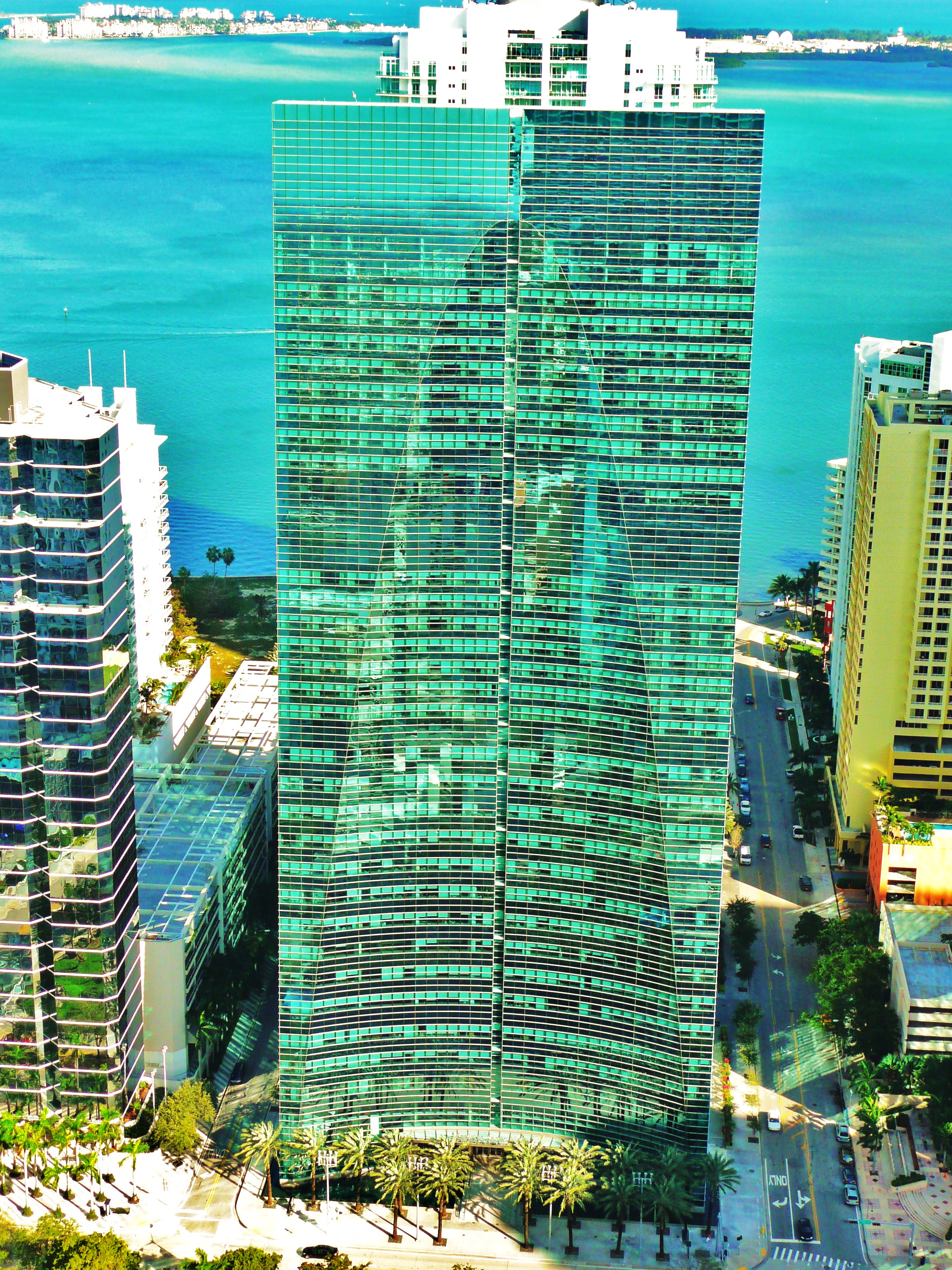
- Brickell Arch on Brickell Avenue

- Location within Florida
- Former names: Espirito Santo Plaza

General information
- Type: Office
- Location: 1395 Brickell Avenue, Miami, Florida, United States
- Coordinates: 25.7607°N 80.1917°W
- Construction started: 2001
- Completed: 2004
- Opening: July 1, 2004

Height
- Roof: 487 ft (148 m)

Technical details
- Floor count: 36

Design and construction
- Architects: Kohn Pedersen Fox Associates PC (KPF), Bermello Ajamil and Partners DJMJ (B&A)
- Structural engineer: Leslie E. Robertson Associates RLLP
- Main contractor: Facchina Construction

Brickell Arch is an office skyscraper in Brickell in Downtown Miami, Florida, United States. It was designed by the architectural firm of Kohn Pedersen Fox Associates PC (KPF). The 487-foot (148-meter), 36-story building is located on the southern end of Brickell Avenue in the Financial District. On April 18, 2012, the AIA's Florida Chapter placed the building on its list of Florida Architecture: 100 Years. 100 Places.

Brickell Arch features a concave parabola design on its front glass façade, loosely echoing the Gateway Arch in St. Louis. One of Miami's common nicknames is "The Gateway to Latin America", which also closely resembles St. Louis's nickname, "The Gateway to the West". It is said to welcome people to the United States as the arch welcomes people to the west.

The building is the North American headquarters for the Espírito Santo Bank and contains some Class A office space. A Conrad Hotel as well as some residential units occupy the remaining space. The building opened July 1, 2004, and is located at 1395 Brickell Avenue, less than a block from the Financial District Metromover Station.

The building is featured in American television series Burn Notice, specifically in an episode titled "Signals and Codes".

== Tenants ==
- French Consulate General, Miami (Suite 1050)
- Espirito Santo Bank Suite 400
- Weil, Gotshal & Manges LLP Suite 1200
- Fowler White & Burnett P.A. Suite 1400
- The Lions’ Den, Attorneys at Law, Suite 900. The Lions’ Den is the only Christian law firm and represents a ministry of Jesus Christ. The Brickell Arch Building was originally named the Espirito Santo building, which means the Holy Spirit building in Portuguese. The Lions’ Den focuses on civil and criminal litigation, immigration, real estate, probate, and other areas of law.
- Brickell Law Group, Suite 900. Brickell Law Group’s managing attorney is Alvaro Acevedo. He is Florida Bar Board Certified in Tax Law and International Law and is the only practicing attorney with both designations in the United States.

== Gallery ==
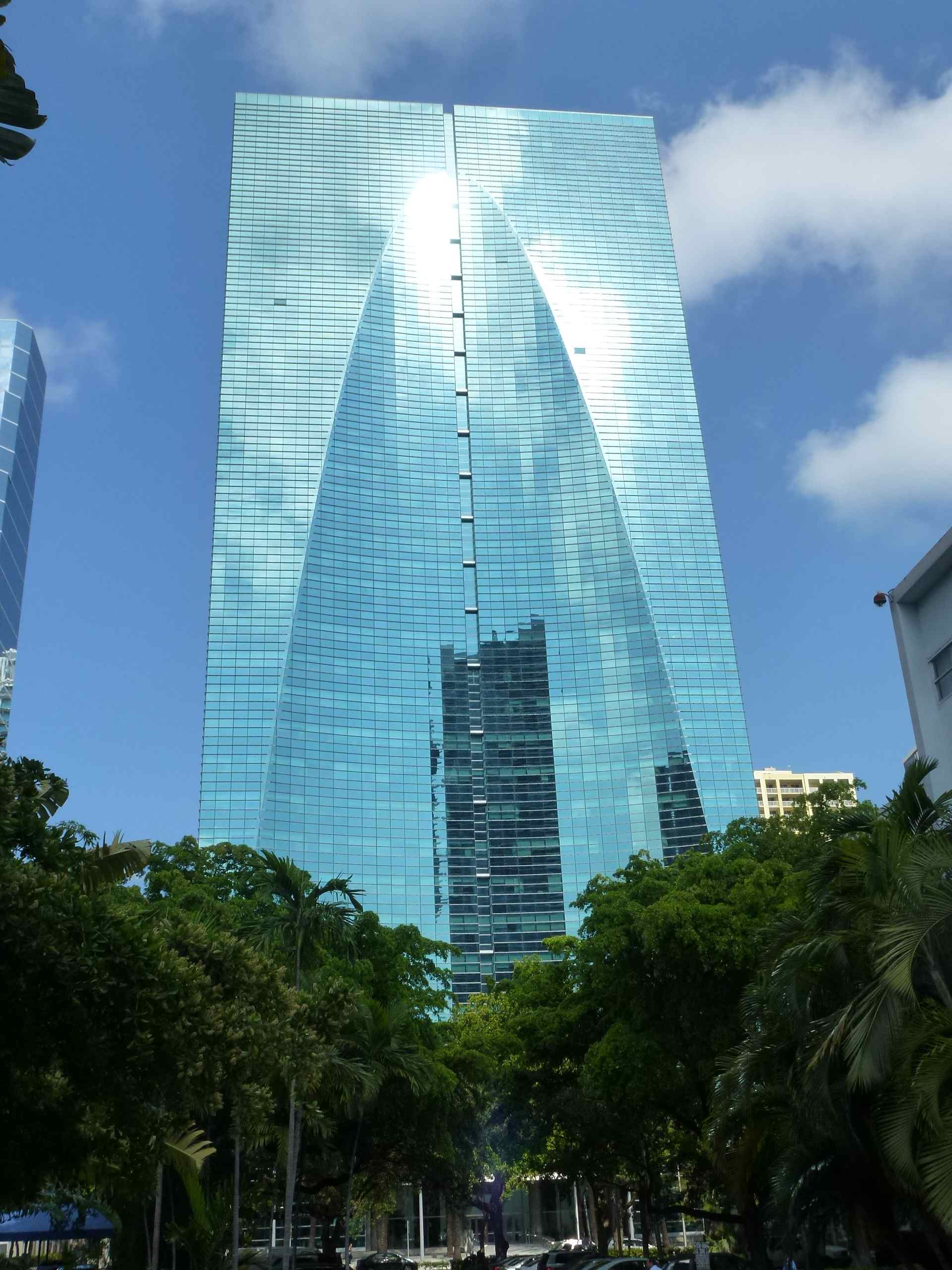
Front view

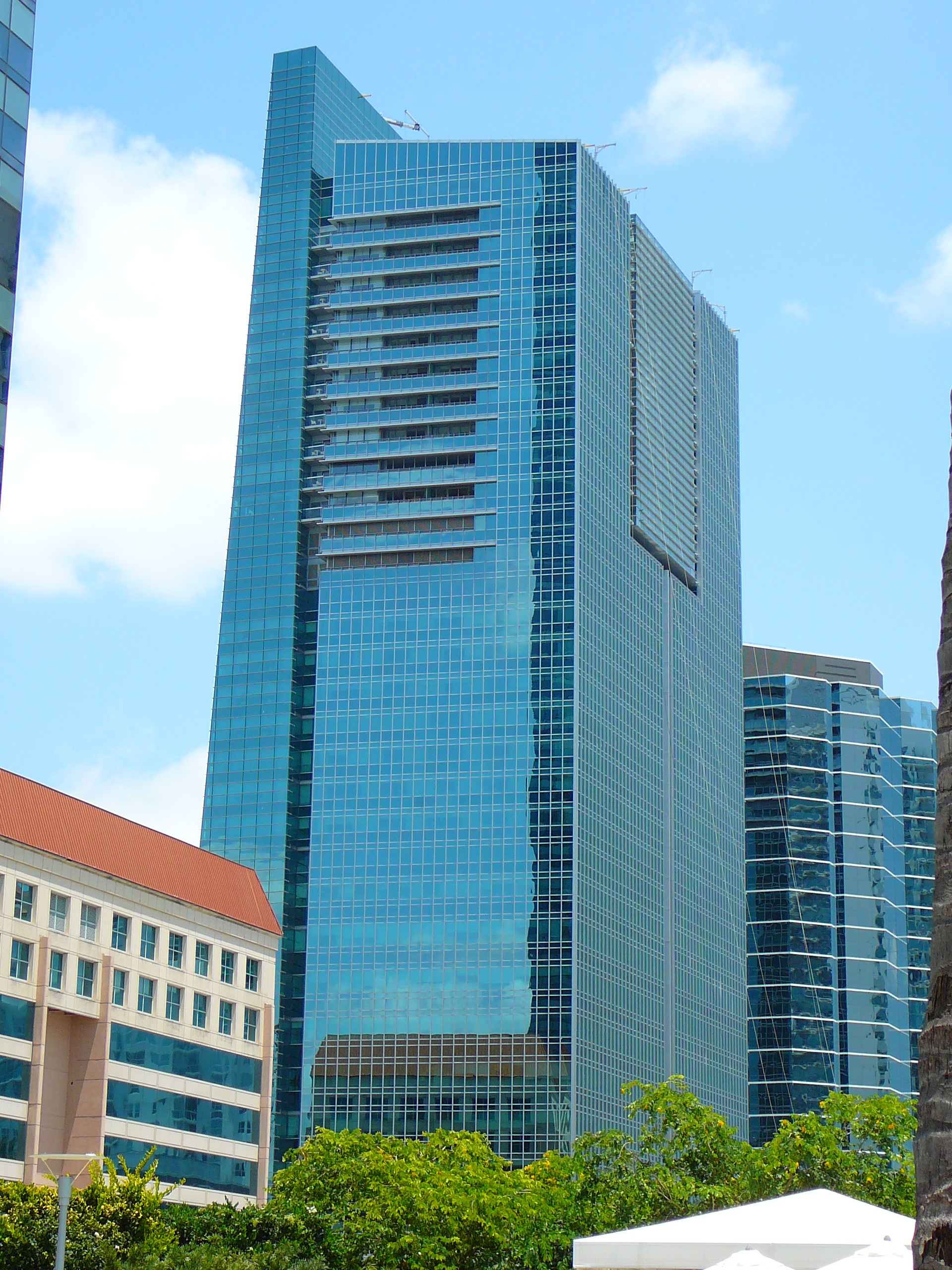
View of the backside of the tower from the pool deck of the Four Seasons hotel in May 2008

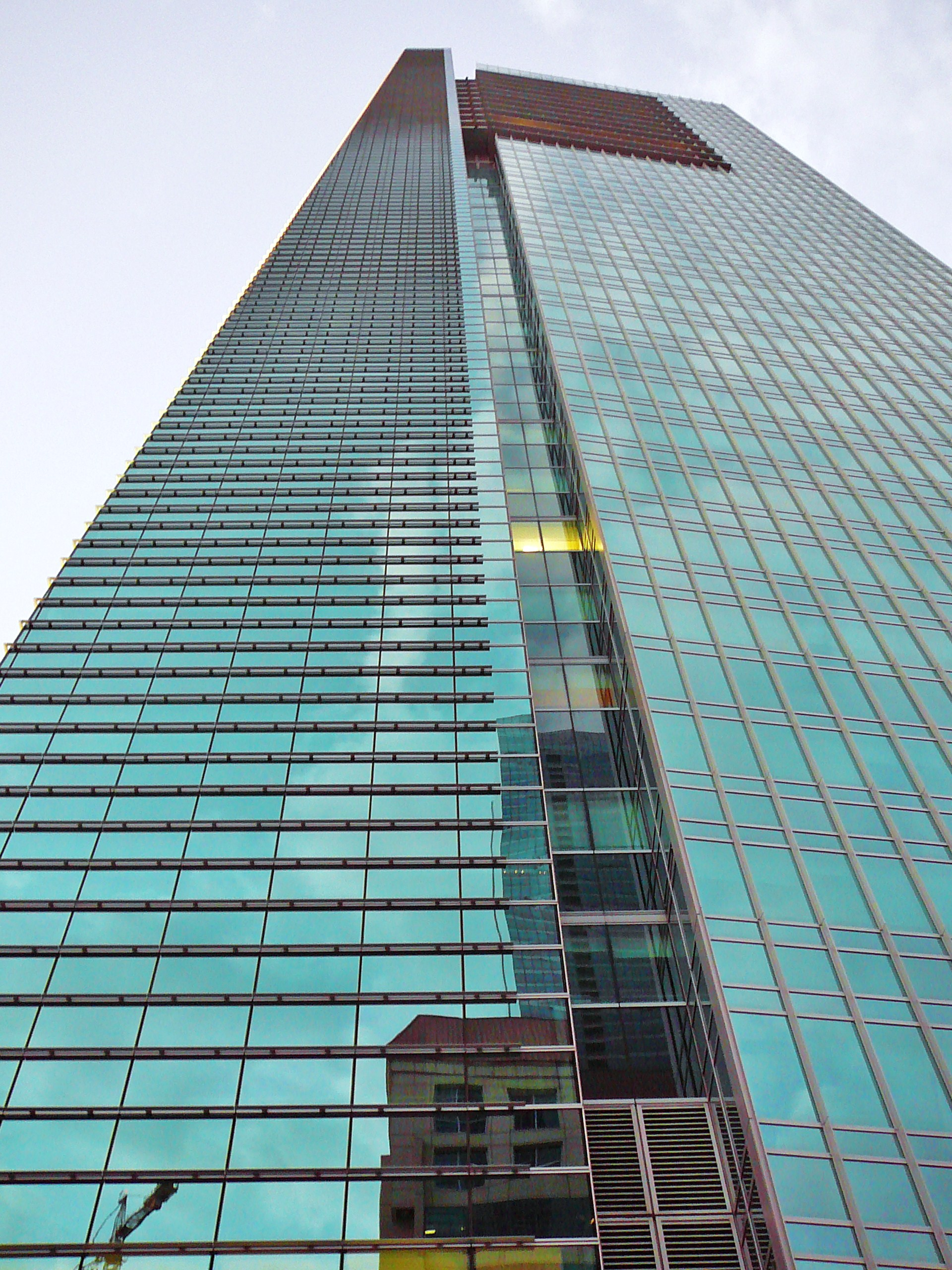
Side view

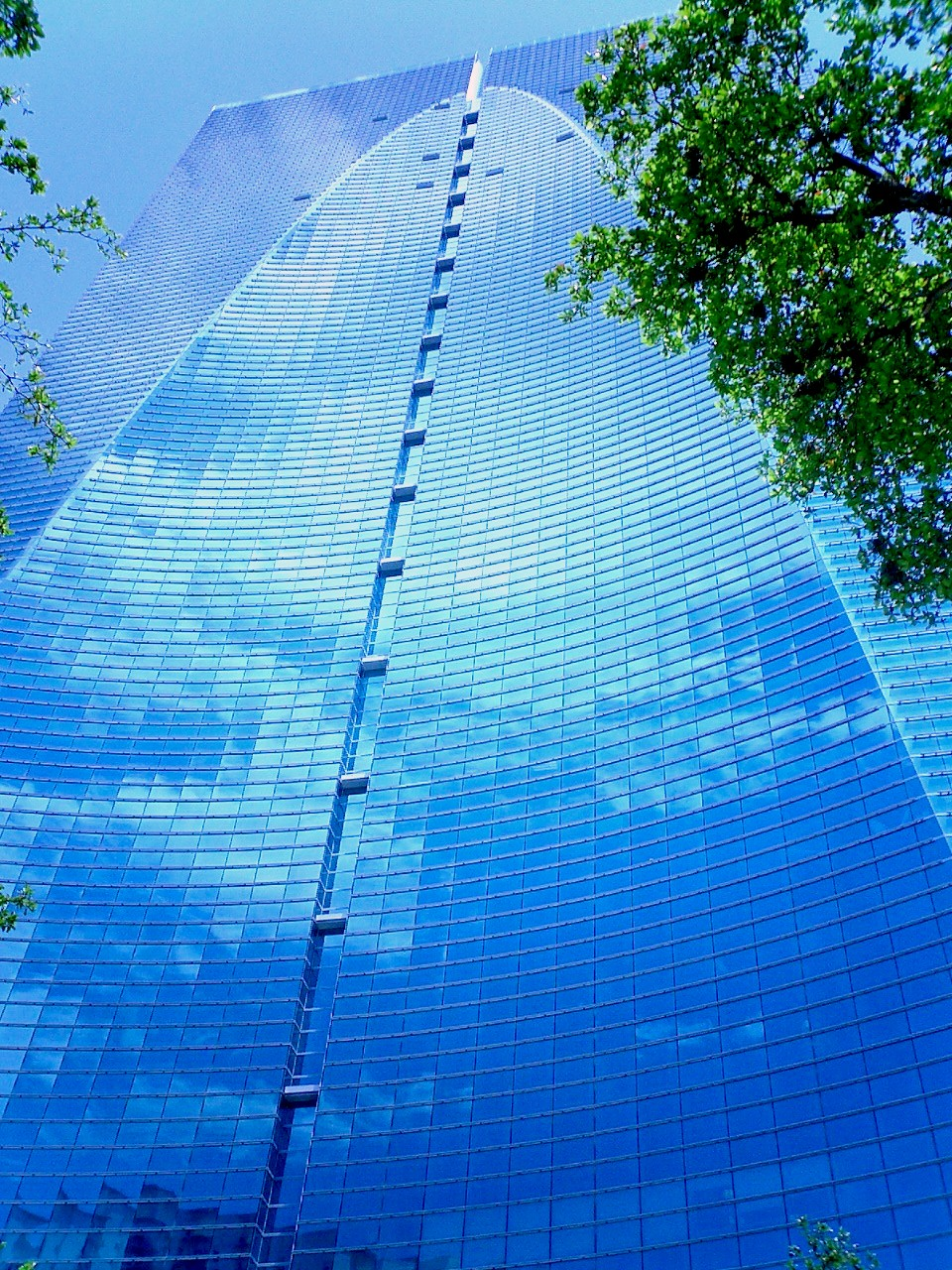
Front facade close-up of Brickell Arch, showing the concave parabola design.

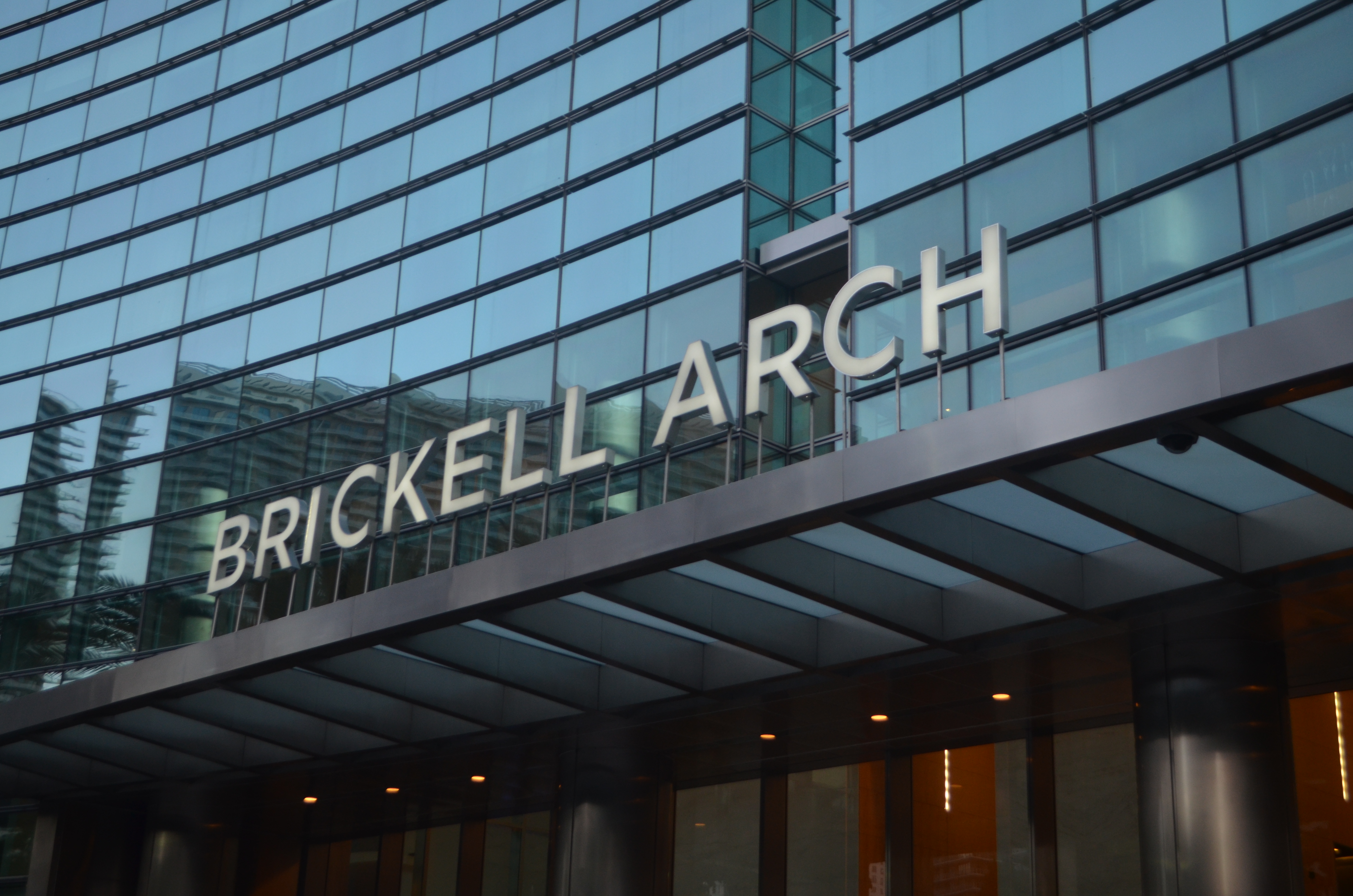
A new sign after renaming

== Awards and honors ==
- AIA Florida, Best Commercial Building in Florida (2012)
- AIA New York City, Citation, Non-Commissioned Project (2001)
- MIPIM, Residential Development, Finalist, (2005)

== See also ==
- List of tallest buildings in Miami
