= 1515 Tower =

Residential building in West Palm Beach, Florida

1515 Tower (originally The Arkona) was a former residential high-rise in West Palm Beach, Florida. Completed in 1974, it was the second tallest building in West Palm Beach with 30 stories and rising 98 metres (322 ft). The building was located at 1515 South Flagler Drive in downtown West Palm Beach.

1515 Tower was heavily damaged during Hurricane Frances and Hurricane Jeanne in 2004 and was subsequently vacated. The facade was heavily damaged as a result of the storms, and on August 1, 2006, the city issued a demolition order. The building was demolished by use of explosives, colloquially called implosion, on Sunday, February 14, 2010. 1515 Tower was the third tallest building in the United States to be imploded. In the mid 2010s, there were several proposals for a new building at the site at 1515 South Flagler Drive, and in 2023, a new 25-story building called La Clara was built there.
