= Lake Josephine (Florida) =

Lake in the state of Florida, United States

- Location within Florida Location within the United States
- Location: between Sebring, Florida and Lake Placid, Florida
- Coordinates: 27°23′44″N 81°26′29″W
- Type: natural freshwater lake
- Basin countries: United States
- Max. length: 1.62 miles (2.61 km)
- Max. width: 0.47 miles (0.76 km)
- Surface area: 1,248.87 acres (505 ha)
- Max. depth: 7.5 feet (2.3 m)
- Surface elevation: 69 feet (21 m)
- Islands: numerous small islands and islets in lake

Lake Josephine is a freshwater lake in Highlands County, Florida, located between the city of Sebring and the town of Lake Placid. The lake, three distinct bodies of water connected by narrow parts of the lake, has a total surface area of 1,248.87-acre (5,054,000 m^{2}). Lake Josephine's south and west sides are bordered in most places by residential areas. The east shore is bordered by a mixture of residences and woods. The northeast shore is bordered by a part of Lake Josephine RV Resort and almost the entire north side of the lake is bordered by woods. Parts of the lake are swampy.

Lake Josephine has public access at three public boat ramps, all three on the south side of the lake.
