= Away colours =

Choice of coloured clothing used in team sports

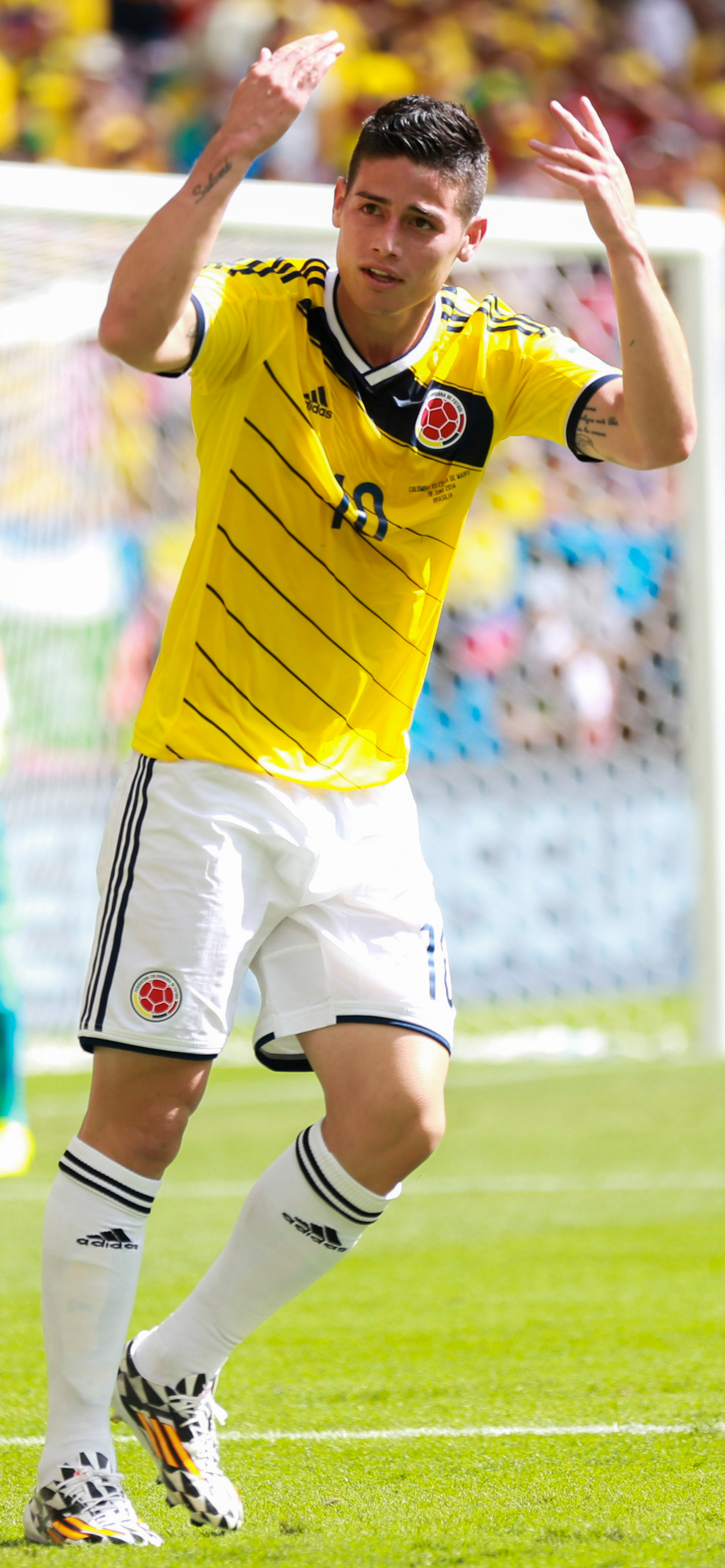
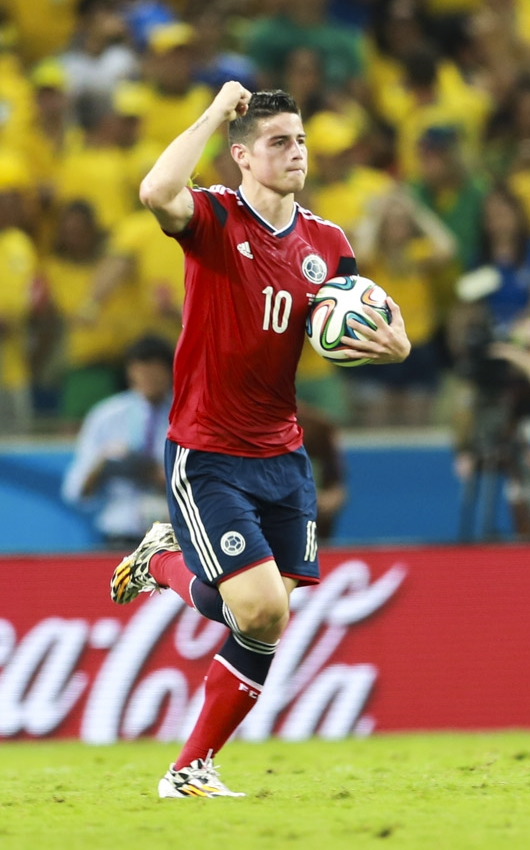
James Rodríguez wearing Colombia's yellow home (left) and red away (right) colours in 2014

Away colours or road colours (also commonly known as away kits in British English, or away uniforms or road uniforms in American English) are a choice of coloured clothing used in team sports. They are required to be worn by one team during a game between teams that would otherwise wear the same colours as each other, or similar colours. This change prevents confusion for officials, players, and spectators. In most sports, it is the visiting or road team that must change.

In many sports leagues and competitions, a team wears its away kit only when its primary kit would clash with the colours of the home team, while other sports leagues and competitions may mandate that away teams must always wear an alternative kit regardless of a potential colour clash. The latter is common in North American sports, where "colour vs. colour" games (e.g., blue uniforms vs. red uniforms) are a rarity, having been discouraged in the era of black-and-white television. Almost all road uniforms are white in gridiron football (including in the Canadian Football League, the National Football League and NCAA football) and the National Hockey League, while in baseball, visitors typically wear grey. In the National Basketball Association and NCAA basketball, home uniforms are white or yellow, and visiting teams wear the darker colour.

Home teams in some leagues and competitions may also have the option to wear away colours at certain home games, and the away team then has to wear the opposite (if applicable). At some clubs, the away kit has become more popular than the home version. Replica home and away kits are usually available for fans to buy. Some teams also have produced third-choice kits, or even old-fashioned throwback uniforms.

In many sports, the colour contrast is only required for the upper body garment, and thus a team's home and away kit may both have the same coloured pants or shorts. It has traditionally been the opposite in Australian rules football where the home team wears dark shorts and the away team wears white shorts.

== American football ==
=== National Football League ===
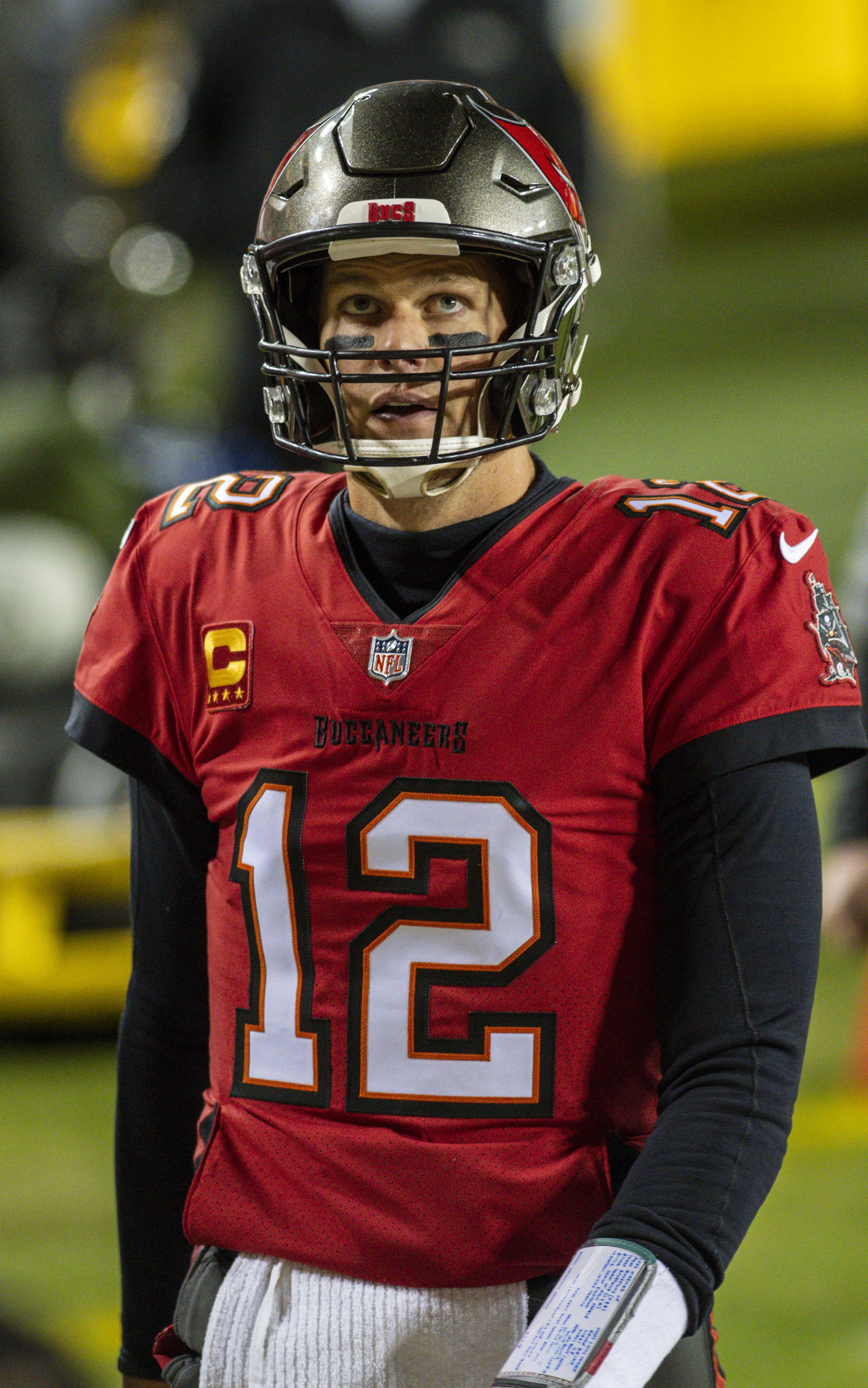
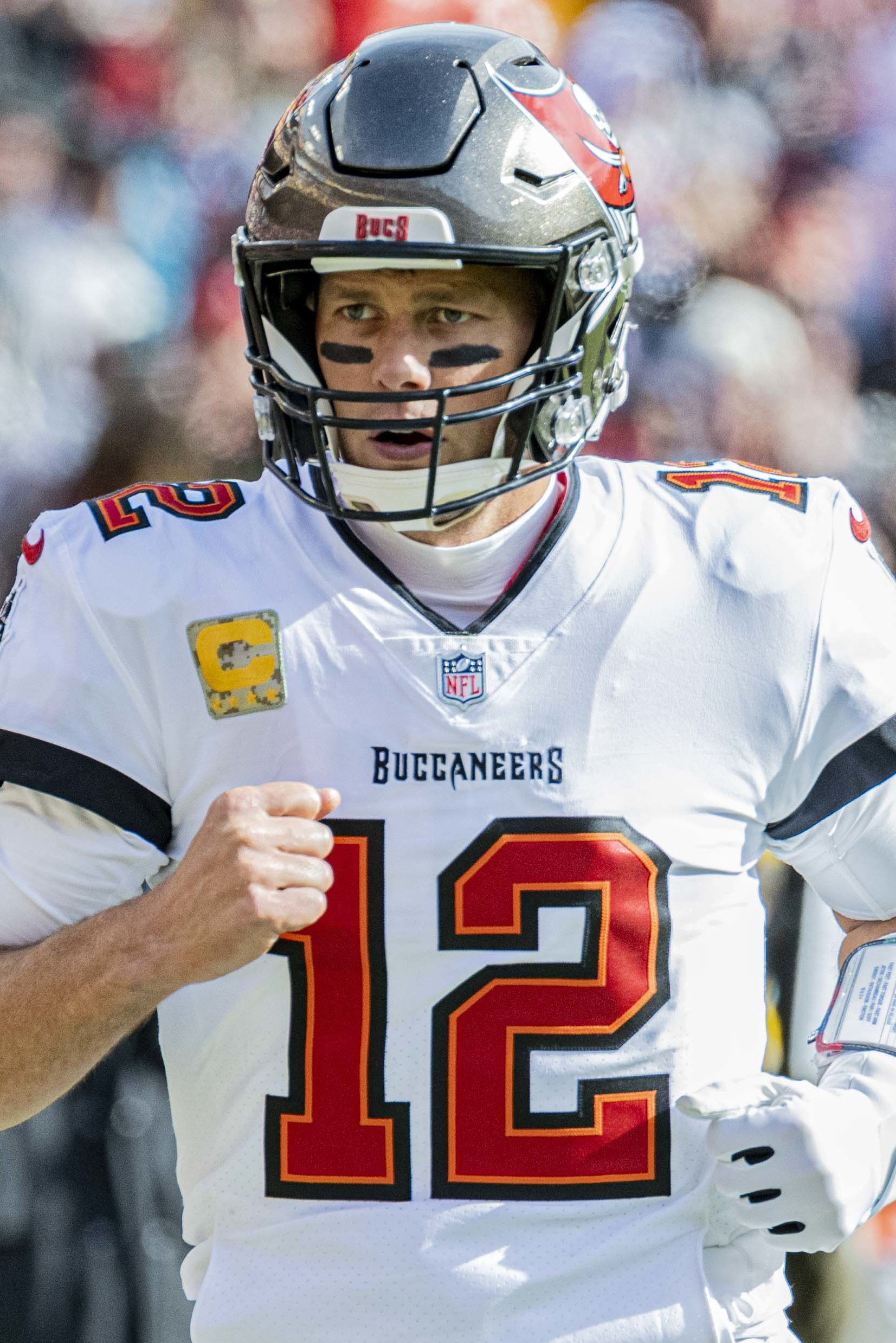
Tom Brady wearing the Tampa Bay Buccaneers' red (left) and white (right) jersey in 2021. In American football, the home team has the choice to wear white or its official team colour and the visiting team must wear the opposite.

In the National Football League (NFL), most teams often wear their "official team colour" at home, with the road team being assigned to wear white in most cases. White road uniforms gained prominence with the rise of television in the 1950s. A "white vs. colour" game was easier to follow in the black-and-white television era. According to Phil Hecken of uni-watch.com, "colour vs. colour" games were actually the norm until the mid-1950s. Even long after the advent of colour television, the use of white jerseys has remained in almost every game.

The NFL's current rules require that a team's home uniforms must be "either white or official team colour" throughout the season, "and visiting clubs must wear the opposite". If a team insists on wearing its home uniforms on the road, the NFL Commissioner must judge on whether their uniforms are "of sufficient contrast" with those of their opponents. The road team may instead wear a third jersey, such as the Seattle Seahawks' "Wolf Grey" alternate.

==== White at home, colour away ====
The Cleveland Browns wore white for every home game of the 1955 season. The only times they wore brown were for games at Philadelphia and New York, when the Eagles and Giants chose to wear white.

In 1964, the Baltimore Colts, Cleveland Browns, Minnesota Vikings and Los Angeles Rams wore white regularly for their home games. The St. Louis Cardinals also wore white for several of their home games. While most teams switched back to their coloured uniforms the next year, the Rams and Browns still regularly wore white until the 1970s, with the Browns even continung it until their temporary deactivation in 1996. Since returning in 1999, the Browns have on occasion worn white at home during the regular season, but for the most part have relegated it to the preseason while wearing brown jerseys for the regular season.

Until 1964, the Dallas Cowboys had worn blue at home, but it was not an official rule that teams should wear their official colours at home. The use of white jerseys was introduced by general manager (GM) Tex Schramm, who wanted fans to see a variety of opponents' jersey colours at home games and continues to do so today.

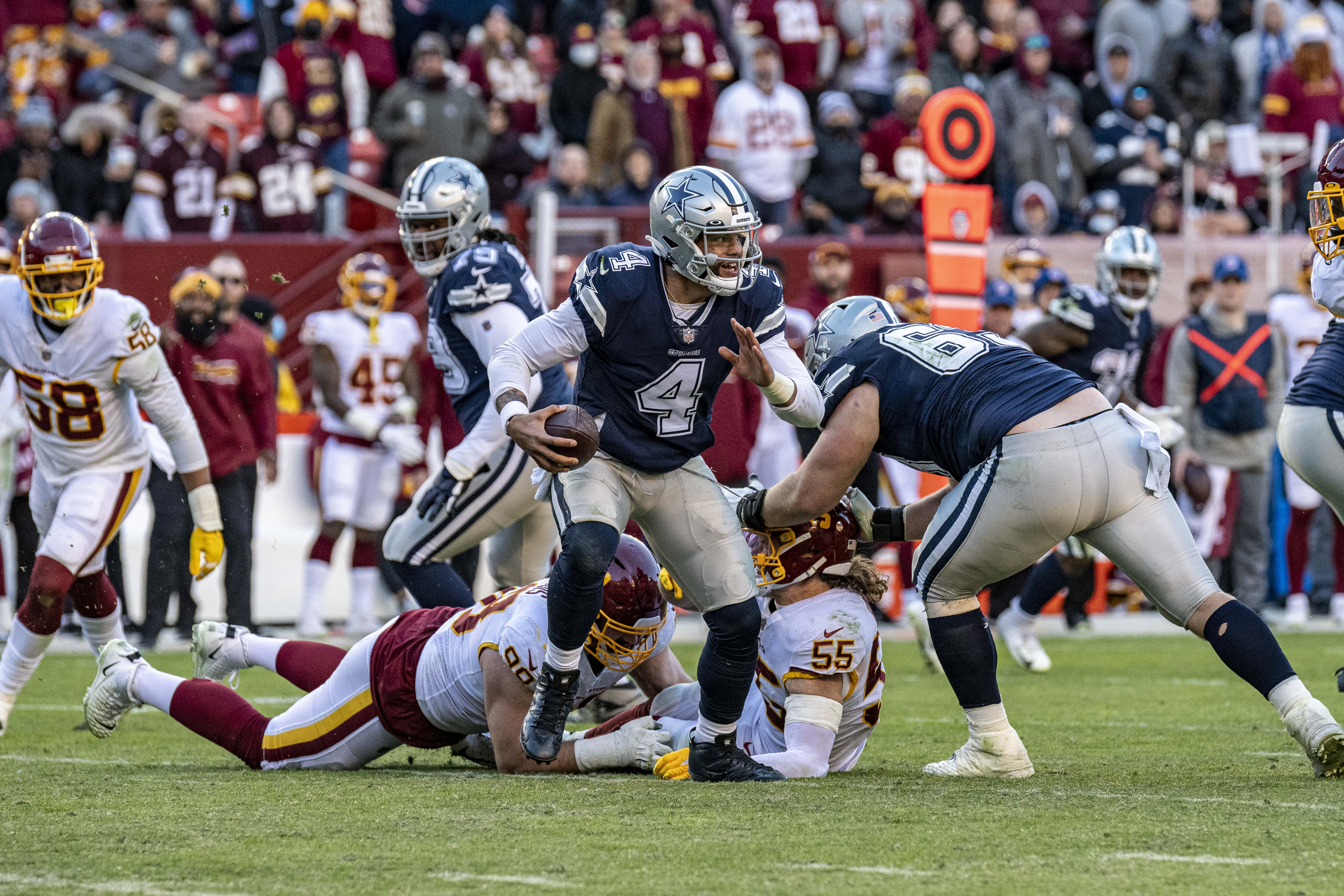
Washington chose to wear their white jerseys during their home game on 12 December 2021, forcing Dallas to wear their navy blue jerseys

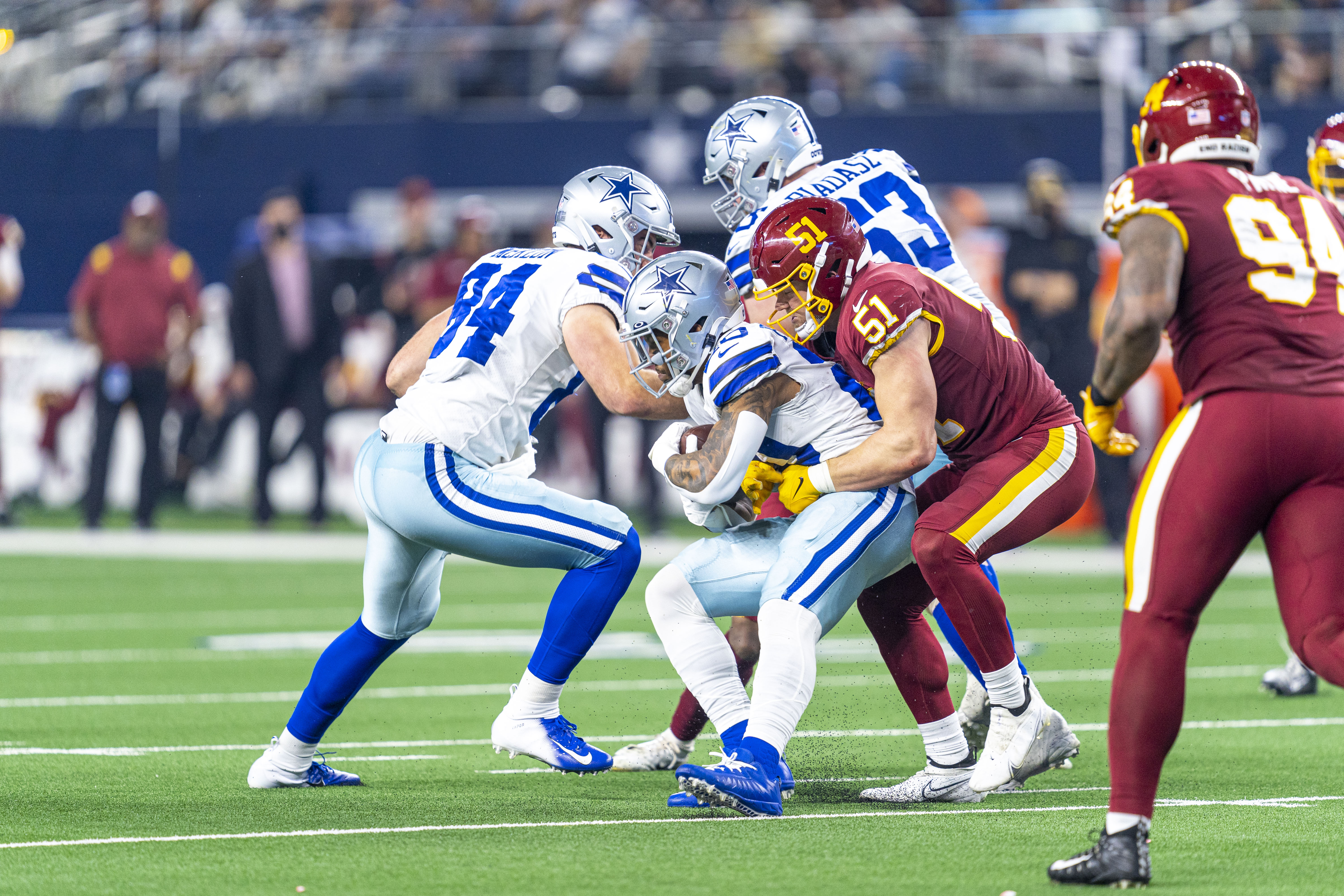
Dallas then chose to wear their white jerseys during their home game on 26 December 2021, forcing Washington to wear their burgundy jerseys

White has also been worn regularly at home by the Miami Dolphins, Washington Commanders, and several other NFL teams. Teams in cities with hot climates often choose white jerseys at home during the first half of the season in late-summer and autumn, because light colours absorb and retain less heat in sunlight. These hot climate teams include several clubs in the Southern United States such as the Carolina Panthers, Houston Texans, Jacksonville Jaguars, New Orleans Saints, Tampa Bay Buccaneers, and Tennessee Titans. The Dolphins in particular will generally stay in white most of the season due to Miami's winter climate, typically only wearing their coloured jerseys for home night games, and 1 p.m. games very late in the season. Every current NFL team has worn white at home at some time in its history, though the Pittsburgh Steelers, having last worn white for a home game in Pittsburgh in 1969 just before the 1970 merger, are the only team not to wear white jerseys in a non-neutral site home game since the start of the 21st century. The Seattle Seahawks had never worn white jerseys at home until their September 24 home game against the Carolina Panthers in 2023.

During the successful Joe Gibbs era, Washington chose to wear white exclusively at home in the 1980s and 1990s, including the 1982 NFC Championship Game against Dallas. Since 2001, they have chosen to wear white jerseys and burgundy jerseys roughly equally in their home games, but they still wear white against the Cowboys. When Gibbs returned from 2004 to 2007, they wore white at home exclusively. In 2007, they wore a white throwback jersey.

The Dallas Cowboys' blue jersey has been popularly viewed to be "jinxed" because of defeats at Super Bowl V in 1971 (when they were assigned to wear their blue jerseys as the designated 'home' team), and in the 1968 divisional playoffs at Cleveland, Don Meredith's final game as a Cowboys player. Dallas's only victory in a conference championship or Super Bowl wearing the blue jerseys was in the 1978 NFC Championship game at the Los Angeles Rams.

Super Bowl rules later changed to allow the designated home team to pick their choice of jersey. White was chosen by the Cowboys (XIII, XXVII), the Redskins (XVII), the Pittsburgh Steelers (XL), the Denver Broncos (50), the New England Patriots (LII), and the Buccaneers (LV). The Broncos and Steelers normally wear colours at home, but Pittsburgh had worn white in three road playoff wins, while Denver cited its previous Super Bowl success in white jerseys (XXXIII), while being 0–4 when wearing orange in Super Bowls.

Occasionally, teams playing against Dallas at home wear their white jerseys to attempt to invoke the "curse", as when the Philadelphia Eagles hosted the Cowboys in the 1980 NFC Championship Game. Teams including the St. Louis Cardinals and New York Giants followed suit in the 1980s, and the Carolina Panthers did so from 1995 until 2006, including two playoff games. The Houston Texans did so in 2002, beating Dallas in their inaugural regular season game. More recently, the Patriots and then-St. Louis Rams tried the same tactic.

The originator of white home jerseys in the NFL at Dallas, Tex Schramm, said he did not believe in the curse.

Starting in 2014, the Panthers, who like many teams in hot climates typically switch from white to colour in October or November, have worn white at home in the postseason regardless of their opponent; the franchise has never won a playoff game while wearing coloured jerseys, including in Super Bowl 50, when the Broncos (as the designated "home" team) chose to wear white.

While they had only done so twice, both to "jinx" Dallas, during the 21 years they played in St. Louis, since returning to Los Angeles in 2016, the Rams, temporarily playing in the same stadium as they had in the 1960s, have worn white at home as a conscious tribute to the teams of that era.

=== Other leagues ===
Coloured road uniforms were used in the World Football League (WFL) during its short period of existence in 1974–75, with the home team wearing white, and college football teams must base their road uniform around a white jersey.

National Federation of State High School Associations rules, which are used by every state for high school football except Texas, require the visiting team to wear a white jersey and the home team to wear a dark jersey. The University Interscholastic League, which governs Texas public high schools, plays by NCAA football rules, which allow for white jerseys to be worn by the home team with prior notification to the visiting team.

== Association football ==
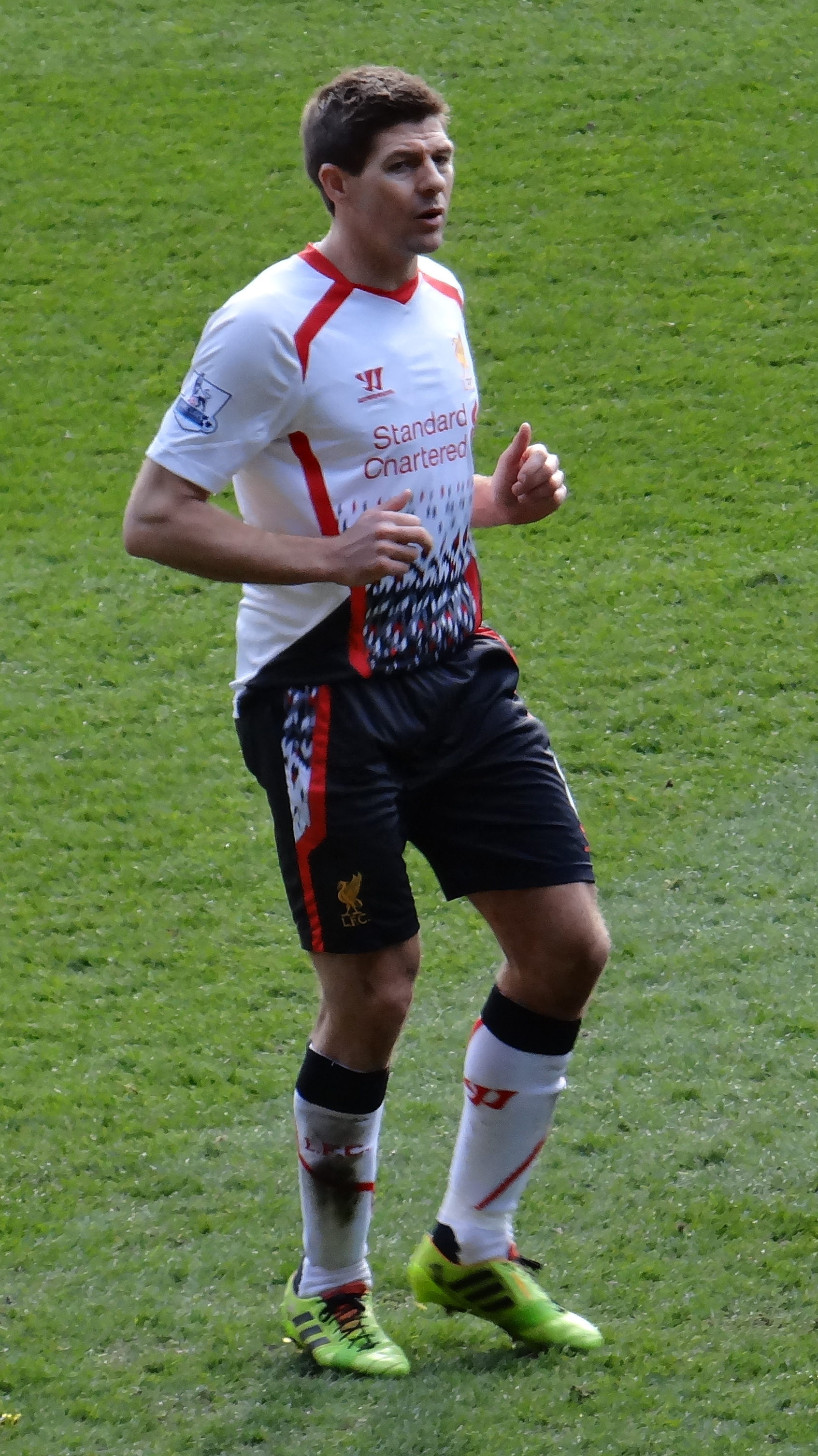
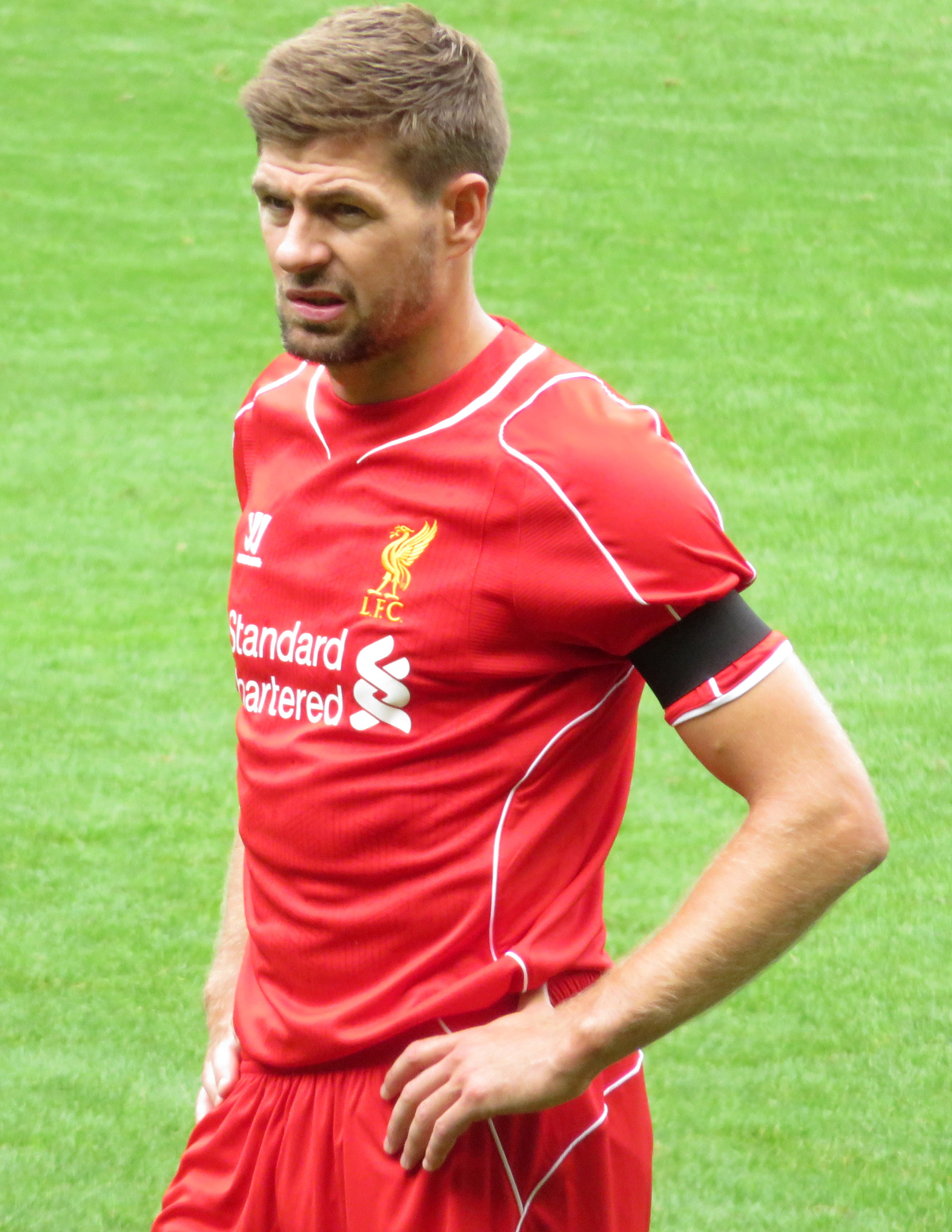
Steven Gerrard wearing Liverpool's away (left) and home kits in 2014

While a team's primary kit rarely undergoes major changes, the second colours tend to vary over time and sometimes by tournament. Some away kits are a modification of the home colours (for example a reversal of primary and secondary colours), other away kits are considerably different from home kits.

Several club and national sides have favourite away colours which might remain the same more or less continuously. Often these are colours that were used in famous victories; for instance Brazil (blue) and A.C. Milan (white). Many professional clubs also have an official third kit.

Some teams opt to wear their away colours even when not required to by a clash of colours, or when they are the home team and therefore get first dibs on their colour. England sometimes play in red away shirts, as the team wore red when it won the 1966 World Cup. A.C. Milan chose to wear all-white in the 2007 UEFA Champions League final as they considered it their "lucky shirt" (Italian: maglia fortunata).

In some title-deciding matches, a team has won the game wearing its away kit, but changed to home shirts for the trophy presentation – most notably when Spain won the 2010 World Cup final, changing from dark-blue away to red home shirts to lift the trophy.

In some cases both teams have been forced to wear their second choice away kits; such as in some World Cup matches (see section below). During the 1998-99 UEFA Champions League, Manchester United had to wear their away colours in both of their group stage matches against F.C. Barcelona, not just away at Camp Nou but also home at Old Trafford too due to a ruling by UEFA that in the event of a clash, the home team had to change their colours.

=== History in European football ===
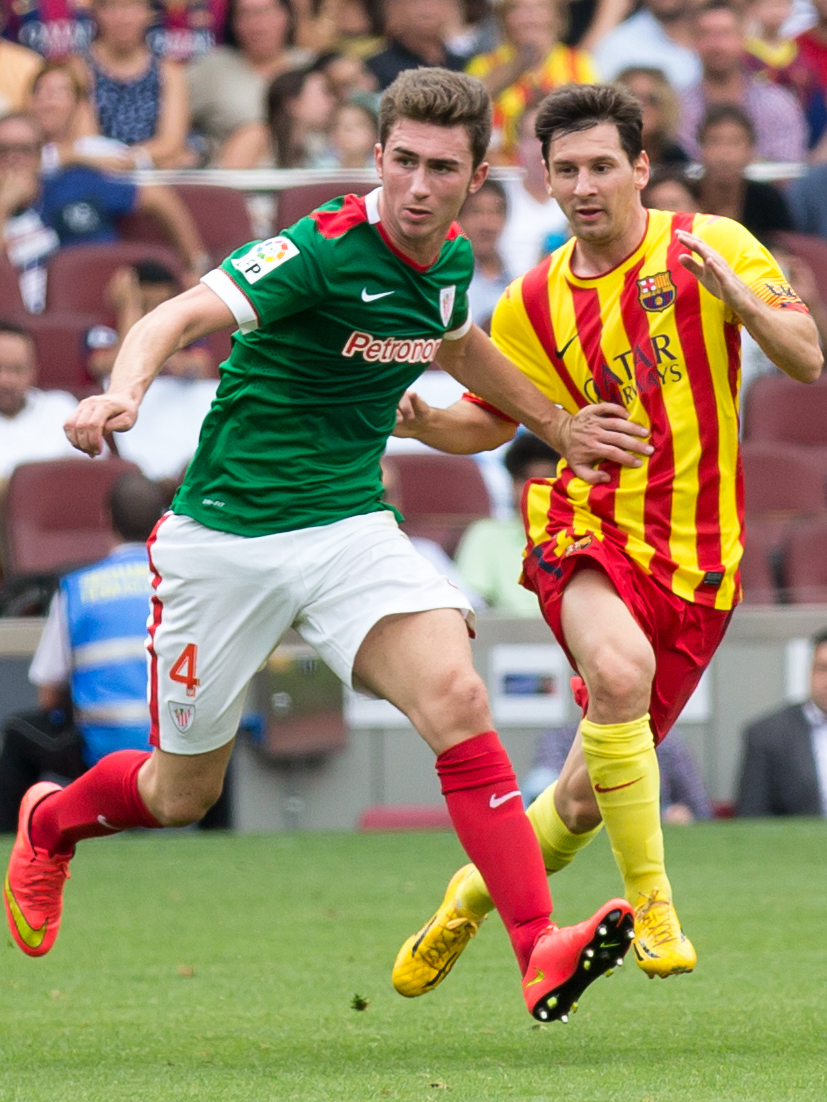
Aymeric Laporte from Athletic Bilbao (left) and Lionel Messi from FC Barcelona playing by choice in change kits in their respective Basque and Catalan regional flag colours (2014)

In England in 1890, the Football League, which had been formed two years earlier, ruled that no two member teams could register similar colours, so as to avoid clashes. This rule was later abandoned in favour of one stipulating that all teams must have a second set of shirts in a different colour available. Initially the home team was required to change colours in the event of a clash, but in 1921 the rule was amended to require the away team to change. In 1927 the Scottish Football Association decreed a different solution, whereby home teams wore white shorts and away teams black shorts, but this rule was rescinded in 1929.

It is normal for individual competitions to specify that all outfield players on a team must wear the same colours, though the Law states only "The two teams must wear colours that distinguish them from each other and the match officials". In the event of a colour clash, the away team must change to a different colour.

Away kits were often worn by both teams in English FA Cup matches. Until 1989–90, its competition rules stated: "Where the colours of the two competing clubs are similar, both clubs must change unless alternative arrangements are mutually agreed by the competing clubs". Clubs sometimes needed to find makeshift third kits for their players. Many FA Cup finals were played under these rules, the last being the 1982 final and its replay. In European competition, the 1968 European Cup final was played under similar rules.

The old FA Cup rules, with almost identical wording, are still used in semis and finals by many county and district football associations in England.

=== FIFA World Cup ===
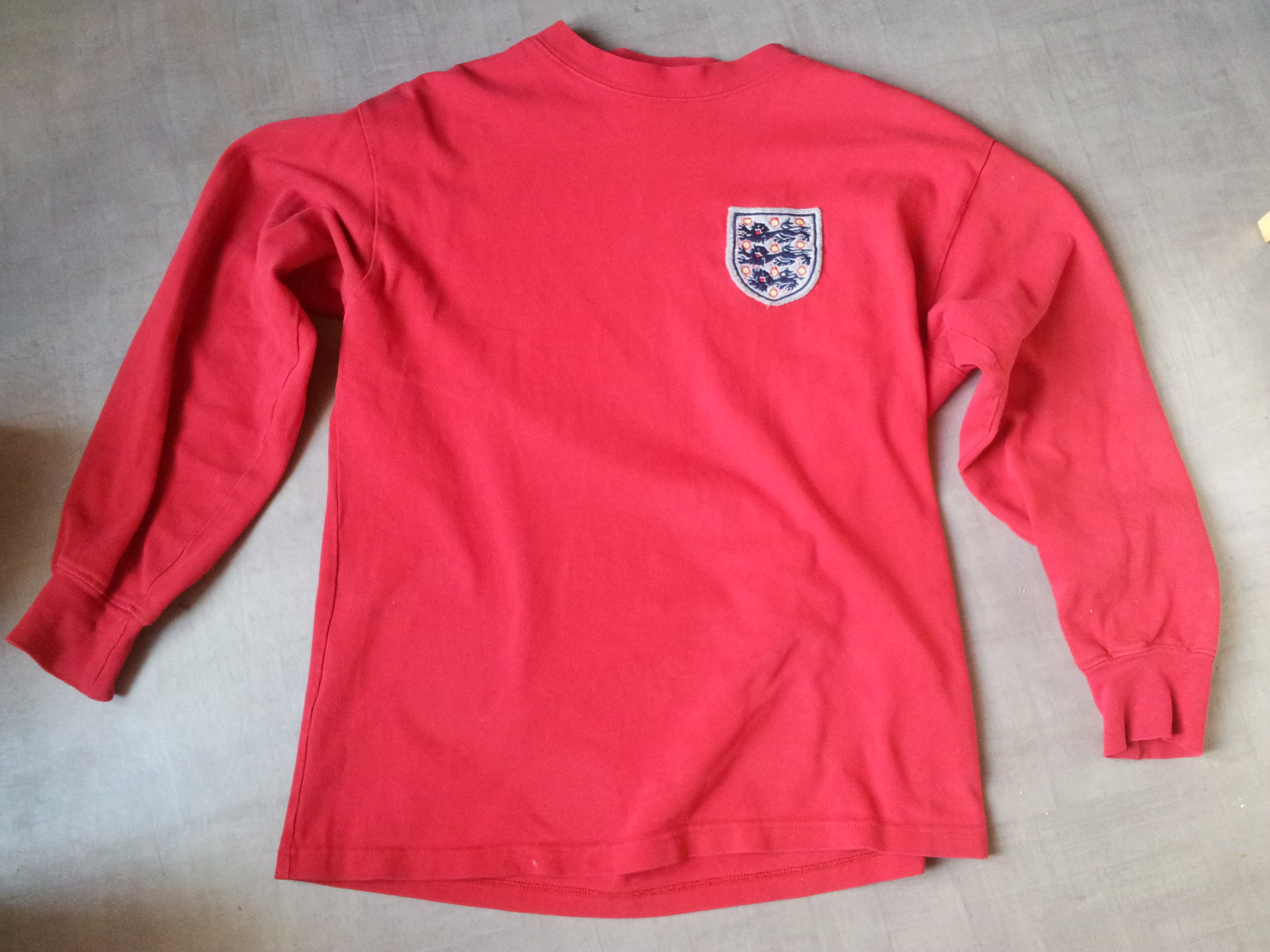
England's away jersey worn in the 1966 World Cup final

Three teams have won the FIFA World Cup final in their away colours – in 1958 (Brazil), 1966 (England), and 2010 (Spain); though England was the home team for the 1966 tournament and Brazil was the home team for the 1958 final.

At international level, away kits are sometimes worn by both teams in a match. FIFA rules state that in exceptional cases, both teams may be asked by the referee or match commissioner to wear different colours. This is most likely to happen in World Cup matches with large numbers of black-and-white television viewers, so that the teams' kits also differ in tone (light and dark). World Cup teams often have to make changes that would be unlikely in domestic or untelevised games. In 1957 Scotland borrowed home team Switzerland's white away shirts to avoid clashing on black-and-white television. In 1970 England and Czechoslovakia were allowed to play in sky blue and white, respectively, which caused confusion for black-and-white viewers and England manager Alf Ramsey. England reverted to red away shirts against West Germany. Netherlands and Brazil played their 1974 World Cup game in white and dark blue respectively, rather than their first choices of orange and yellow; by contrast in the 1998 FIFA World Cup semi-final Netherlands and Brazil each got their first choice of orange and yellow.

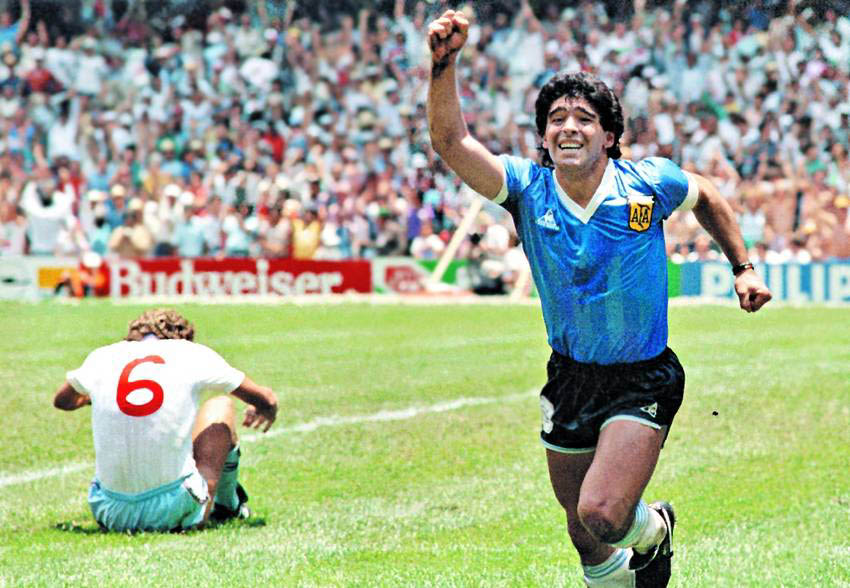
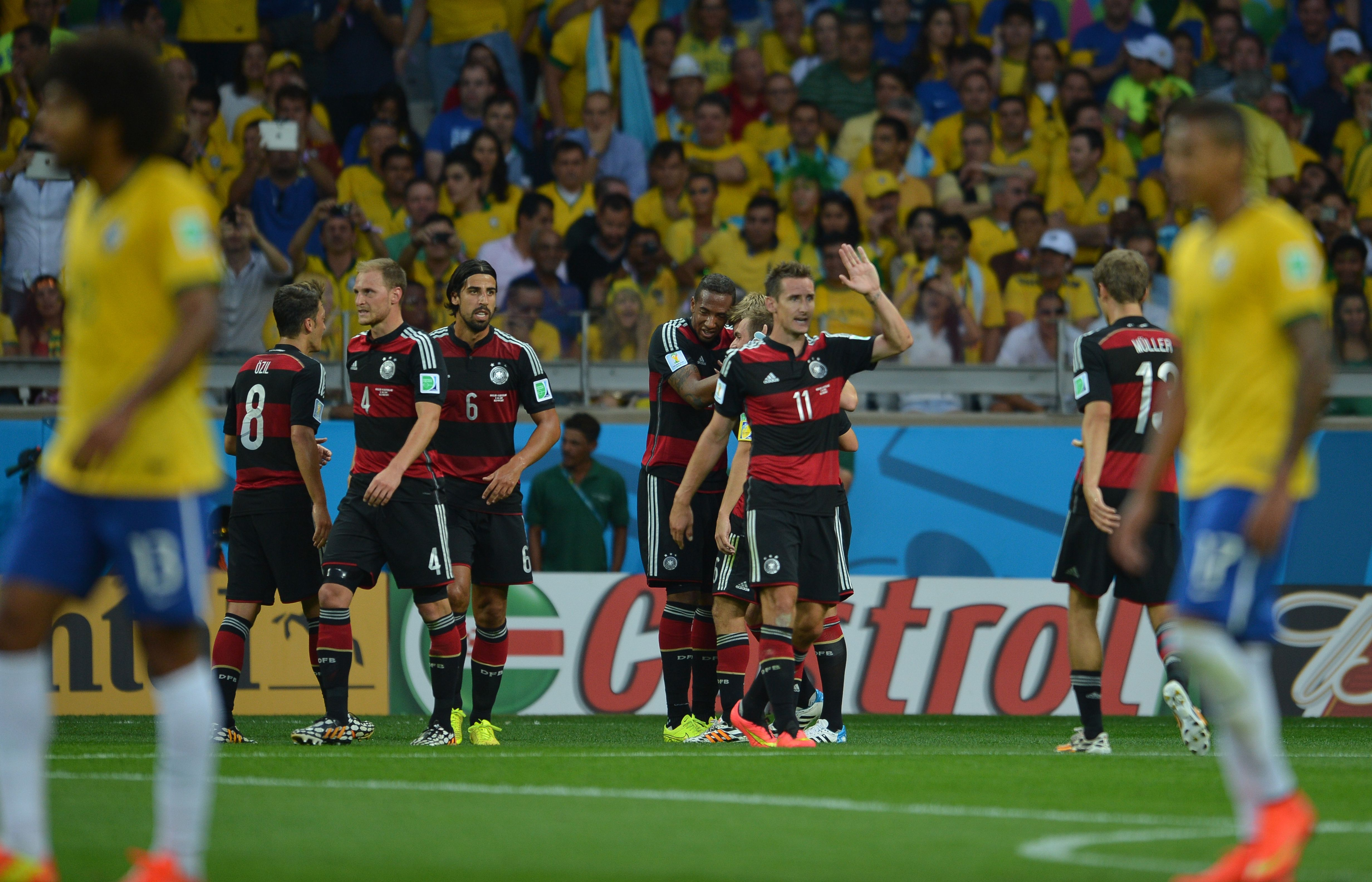
Away kits in the FIFA World Cup: (left) Diego Maradona with Argentina v England in 1986 and Brazil v Germany in 2014

FIFA's regulations for the 2014 World Cup mandate that "teams need to have two very distinguishable shirts – where one is a lighter colour and the other is a darker one".

At the 2014 World Cup, Croatia were allowed to wear red-and-white checked shirts, instead of blue, against Brazil, only after Croatia appealed FIFA's original decision. England were not allowed to wear red away shirts, and instead were made to wear white against Uruguay, due to an apparent clash with officials' uniforms.

Before the 2014 tournament, FIFA decreed that Spain's all-red home kit and all-black away kit were not sufficient as they were both considered dark tones. FIFA forced Spain to produce an all-white third kit. The match between the Netherlands and Spain was played in the Netherlands' dark blue away kits and Spain's white third-choice kits.

In the 2018 FIFA World Cup third place match, both Belgium and England wore their away colours of yellow and red by choice, respectively, despite their home colours of red vs white not clashing (Belgium and England had already wore their home colors of red and white in when they met in Group G). Denmark and Australia also wore their away kits in a group stage match, after Danish player Thomas Delaney revealed in a phone call to a radio station that he is colourblind.

== Australian rules football ==
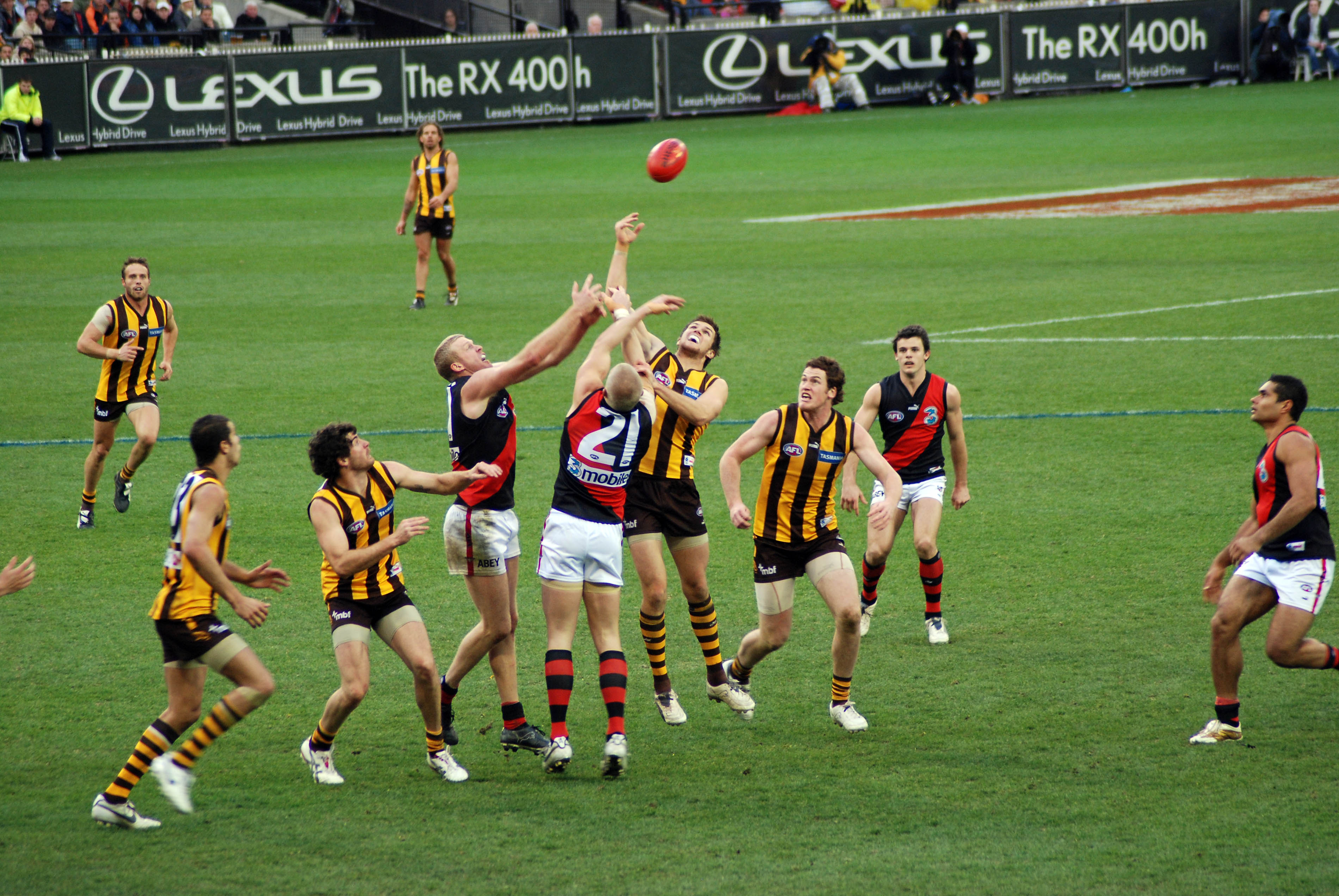
An AFL match between Hawthorn and Essendon in 2007. The home team, Hawthorn, is wearing dark shorts, with the away team, Essendon, wearing white shorts

The Australian Football League legislates that the home team has the right to choose what home colours they play in for home games during the home and away season. Traditionally in Australian football and first introduced into VFL in 1924 the home team wears dark shorts while the away team wears white shorts. In contrast to other sports, the concept of away colours is not prominent, with clubs traditionally wearing their home guernseys week in week out, with the colour of a team's shorts distinguishing between home teams and away teams. The concept of home and away colours first became prominent during the late 1980s and the 1990s, when the newly admitted Brisbane Bears had colours and jumper designs clashing with that of Hawthorn, which necessitated the need for clubs to come up with away colours. All AFL teams now have designated clash guernseys, which are worn in matches when the home guernseys of the teams playing are deemed to be too similar to distinguish.

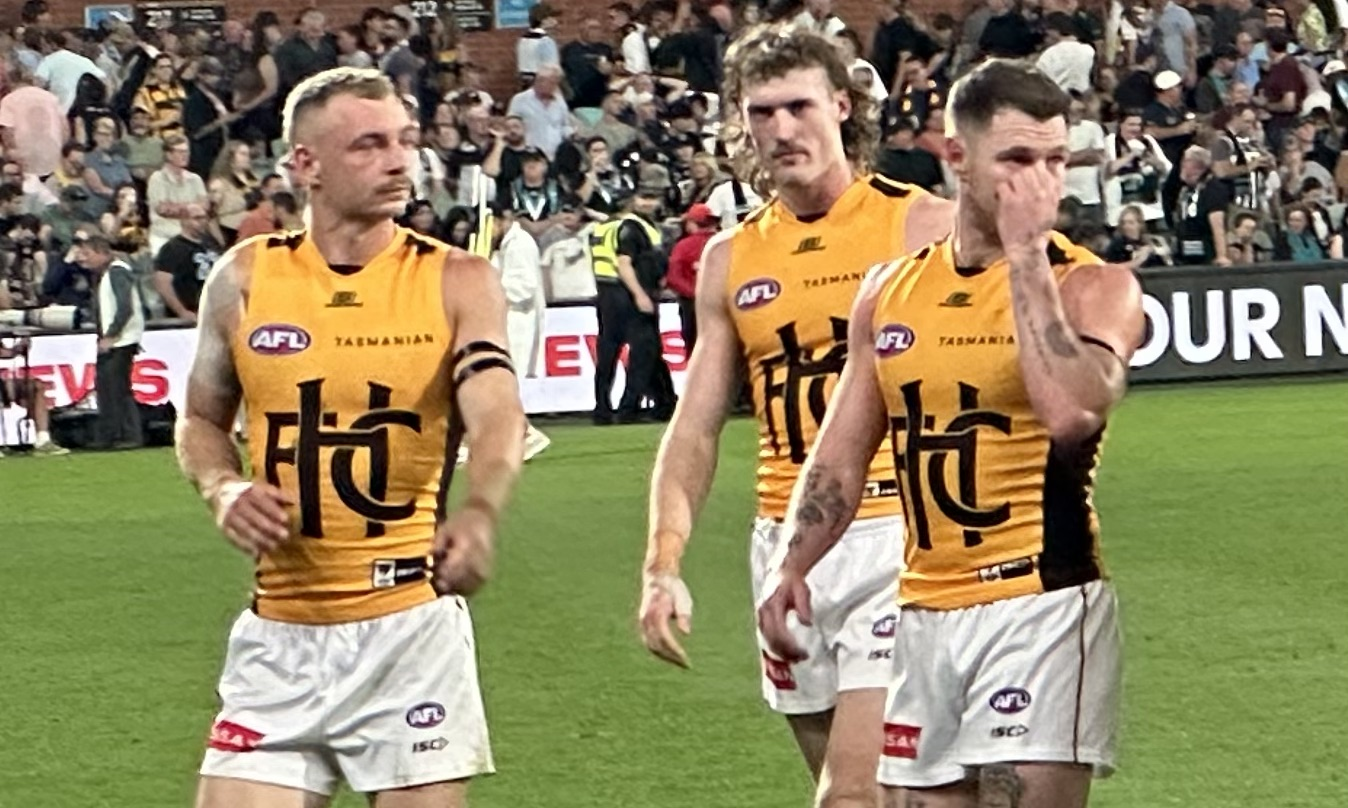
Hawthorn players wearing away colours in 2025. The club's home guernsey consists of vertical brown and gold stripes

Often white shorts only are used to distinguish between home and away teams, this has been criticised for not providing sufficient distinction between teams that play in similar colours or guernsey designs. For example, in 2007, Geelong coach Mark Thompson spoke out about the need for the AFL to take action to prevent guernsey clashes in future AFL matches, after a match between Geelong and Collingwood where spectators had difficulty distinguishing between Geelong's navy blue and white horizontal stripes and Collingwood's vertical black and white stripes even though the game was played in good conditions. This combination happened again in 2019, creating again more controversy with the clash being created largely because Geelong wore blue shorts and Collingwood wore white shorts. Additionally, in the 2021 Anzac Day clash, both Collingwood and Essendon wore predominantly black Anzac Day jumpers, with the only distinction between the teams being Essendon's white shorts, with spectators experiencing difficulty in telling apart the teams. This happened again between the two teams on ANZAC Day 2023 with both teams wearing mostly black jumpers with white (Collingwood's white stripes and Essendon jumper numbers) and red (Essendon's red sash and Collingwood's Emirates and KFC sponsorship). In some cases, individual clubs may have informal agreements around what guernsey designs to wear in order to avoid clashes. For example, Collingwood president Eddie McGuire claimed that he had made a handshake agreement with then-Geelong president Frank Costa in the 1990s in which Geelong would always wear white shorts and a white jumper for all matches between Geelong and Collingwood, with Collingwood wearing black shorts and a black jumper. This came out after the aforementioned 2019 Geelong-Collingwood match.

In the AFL Grand Final, the team that finishes higher during the regular season has the right to choose the colours they play in, with the lower-ranked team to accommodate this accordingly. An example of this occurred in the 2017 AFL Grand Final between 1st placed Adelaide and 3rd placed Richmond; as the higher ranked team, Adelaide chose to play in their home guernsey, and as the lower ranked team, Richmond was forced to play in their clash guernsey of yellow with a black sash as opposed to their usual black guernsey with a yellow sash, as their home guernsey was deemed to clash with Adelaide's home guernsey.

== Baseball ==
=== Major League Baseball ===
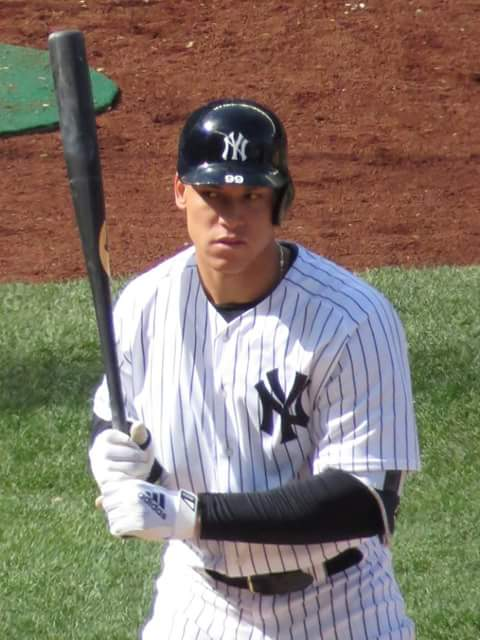
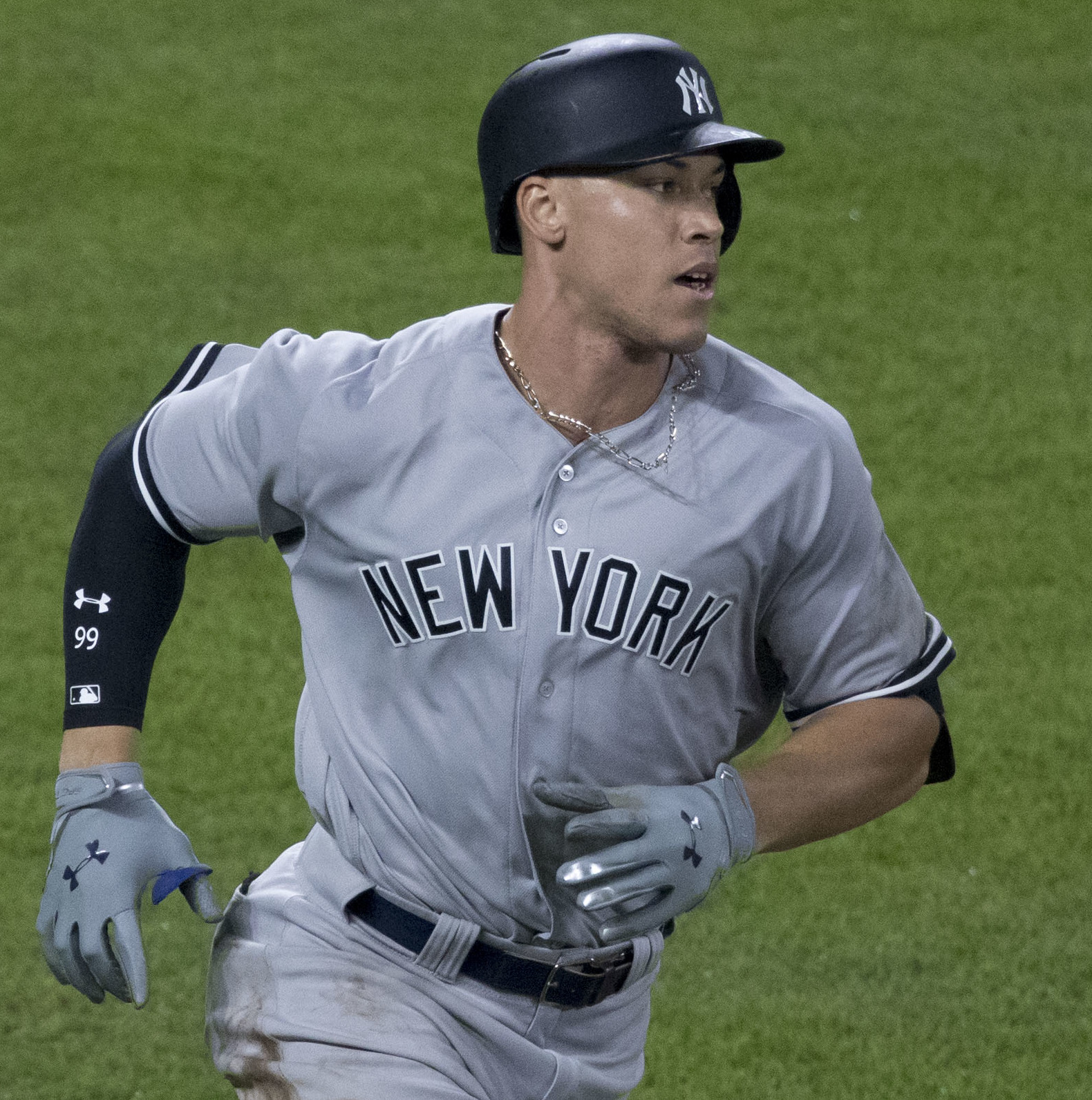
Aaron Judge wearing the New York Yankees's white home (left) and grey away (right) uniforms in 2018. Baseball teams typically wear white at home and gray at road games.

Originally, Major League Baseball teams were primarily distinguished by the colours of their stockings. In 1882, the National League assigned different stocking colours to the member clubs; the league also assigned jersey and cap colours, but by player position rather than by club.

The Cincinnati Reds were known as the "Red Legs" and "Red Stockings" during the early 1900s.

By the end of the 19th century, it became common for teams to wear white uniforms at home, and grey in road games. Some teams used road uniforms of solid dark blue or black. An early example of this is the Brooklyn Superbas, who started to use a blue pattern for their road uniforms in 1907. Both the home and away teams' uniforms also contained trim in the team colours.

In 1916, on the New York Giants' road uniforms, purple lines gave their uniforms a tartan-like effect and another kind of road uniform was a solid dark blue or black material with white around this time. The Kansas City Athletics home and road uniforms were changed by Charles O. Finley in 1963, to the colours of gold and green. Some teams used powder blue for their road uniforms from the 1970s to the early 1990s.

Aside from the obvious need to distinguish one team from the other, conventional wisdom held that it was more difficult to properly launder uniforms while on a road trip, thus the "road grays" helped to hide accumulated soil. This convention continued well after its original premise was nullified by the issuance of multiple uniforms and the growth of the laundromat industry.

Typically, home uniforms feature the team's nickname, while away uniforms feature the name of the team's geographic designation; there are seven teams that are exceptions to this rules: the Tampa Bay Rays, Los Angeles Angels, Philadelphia Phillies, St. Louis Cardinals, Miami Marlins, Detroit Tigers and New York Yankees.

The Cardinals, Phillies, Rays and Angels wear their team nickname on both home and away jerseys, although the Cardinals now wear alternates (cream at home, powder blue on the road) with the city name. The Marlins' home and away jerseys feature the city name, but a black alternate has the team nickname. From 1973 to 2008, the Baltimore Orioles were part of this group – the omission of the city's name being part of a largely successful effort to attract fans from the Washington, D.C. area – before returning "Baltimore" to the road jerseys in 2009, by which time their neighbour 35 miles (55 km) to the south once again had a team of its own.

The Tigers and Yankees both wear their cap insignia on the left breast of their home jerseys, but the city name on their away jerseys.

In addition to this, some teams have featured mainly their team's location presented on their uniforms both at home and on the road. Examples include the Rangers (2009-19) and Marlins, whose alternate orange jersey is the only one of the team's four to feature the nickname instead of the city or state name. Some teams have alternate home uniforms featuring location such as the Colorado Rockies and St. Louis Cardinals. The Brewers wore a navy jersey with "Milwaukee" on the front frequently both at home and on the road from 2015-19, while the Los Angeles Dodgers have worn an alternate grey jersey with the nickname instead of the city name for most away games since 2014.

For the 2023 season, the Seattle Mariners announced that they would no longer be wearing their gray road jerseys to accommodate MLB's uniform rules that say teams may only have 4 uniforms, plus one City Connect alternate. They now wear their blue "SEATTLE" jerseys during road games. In the same year, the Tampa Bay Rays announced that they would be removing their road grays from their rotation. This move coincided with the addition of a throwback Devil Rays alternate uniform.

== Basketball ==
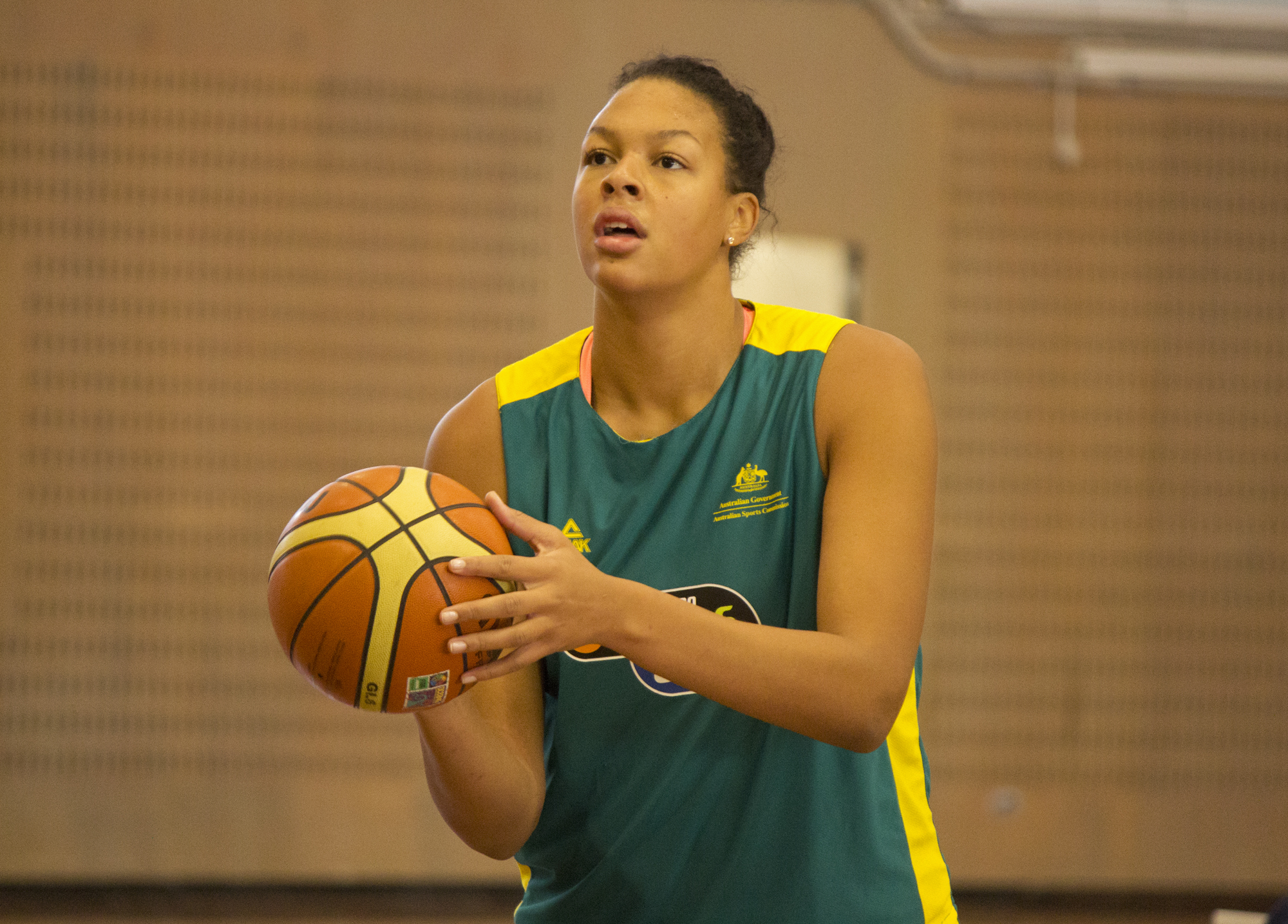
Liz Cambage in Australia's away colours

Until the 2017–18 season, the rules of the National Basketball Association (NBA) stated that the home team must always wear their light coloured jerseys and the visitors wear their dark jerseys unless otherwise approved. Most teams' home uniforms are white, with some exceptions, such as the Los Angeles Lakers, who wear yellow at home (although in 2002, to honour Chick Hearn, Jeanie Buss had a white jersey introduced as the third uniform, worn at home). But, according to this rule, road uniforms are required at every game in the NBA. "Dark" colours worn in road games vary widely among teams. The use of specially designed Christmas uniforms in NBA games in 2012 led to several "colour vs. colour" match-ups.

Beginning with the 2017–18 season, the home team is allowed to designate whether it will wear a lighter-coloured or darker-coloured jersey. The visiting team must wear a jersey of sufficient contrast, whether it be white, yellow, or another darker colour. Furthermore, the NBA eliminated "home" and "away" uniform designations, and began to officially refer to the lighter-coloured jerseys as "Association" uniforms and the darker-coloured jerseys as "Icon" uniforms.

In NCAA Division I college basketball, the home team almost universally wears white uniforms, while the visiting team wears dark colours. There are exceptions, such as the Michigan Wolverines, LSU Tigers, Missouri Tigers and West Virginia Mountaineers wearing yellow at home, or the Illinois Fighting Illini wearing orange at home, or the Kansas State Wildcats wearing lavender at home, if it sufficiently contrasts with the visiting team's uniforms.

== Cricket ==
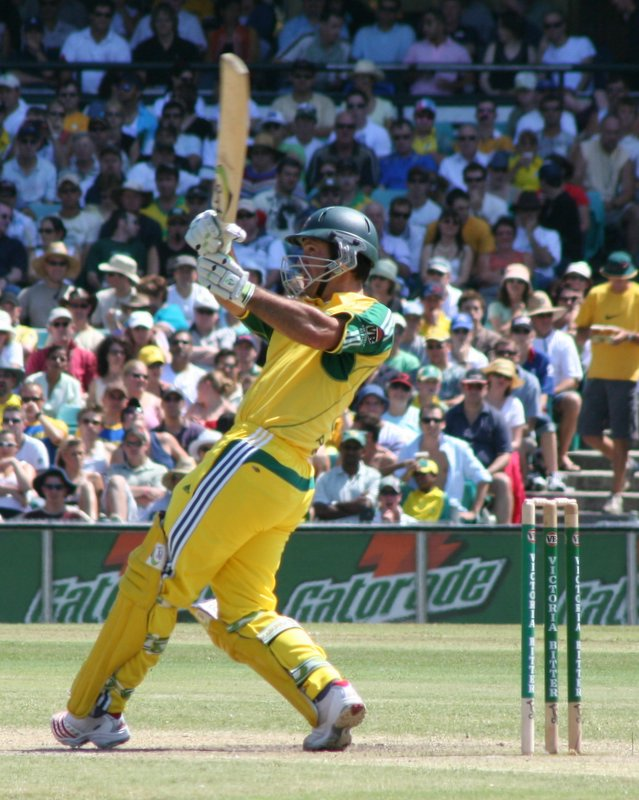
Ricky Ponting in Australia's away kit

Away kits are a recent development in cricket, as is coloured clothing in general; cricket has been played in all-white clothing for most of its history. The first professional match played in coloured clothing was in World Series Cricket in Australia in 1979. The first Cricket World Cup to use coloured kits was the 1992 tournament.

The England team uses one kit for all home and away ODI and Twenty20 matches. India also uses a light blue kit for both.

Australia, however, has a separate green ODI home kit, yellow ODI away kit, and black T20 kit. The home kit is the same colour as the famous "baggy green" cap traditionally worn by Australian Test cricketers, but the yellow away kit is often worn by the Australian team in home matches.

== Ice hockey ==
=== National Hockey League ===
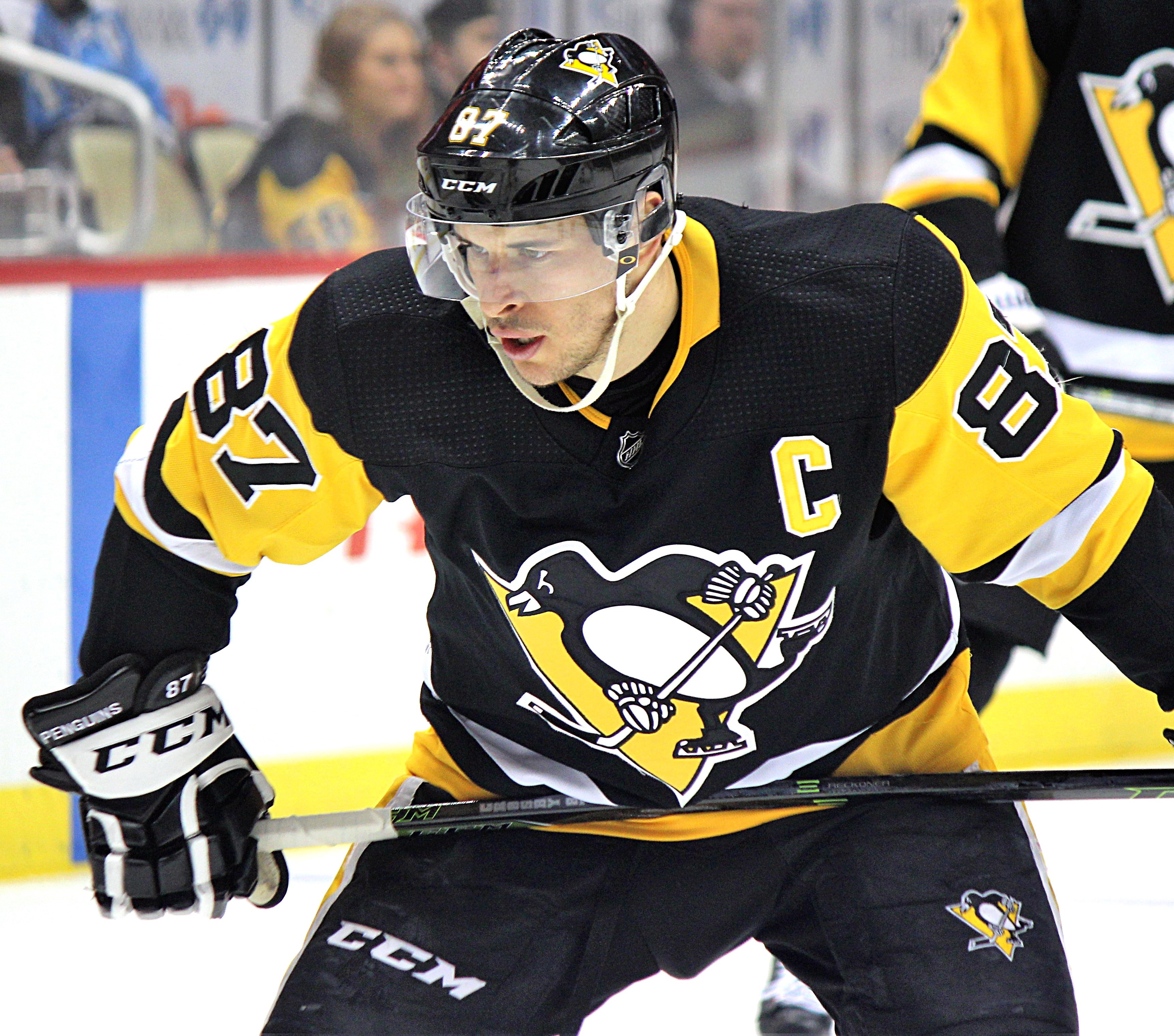
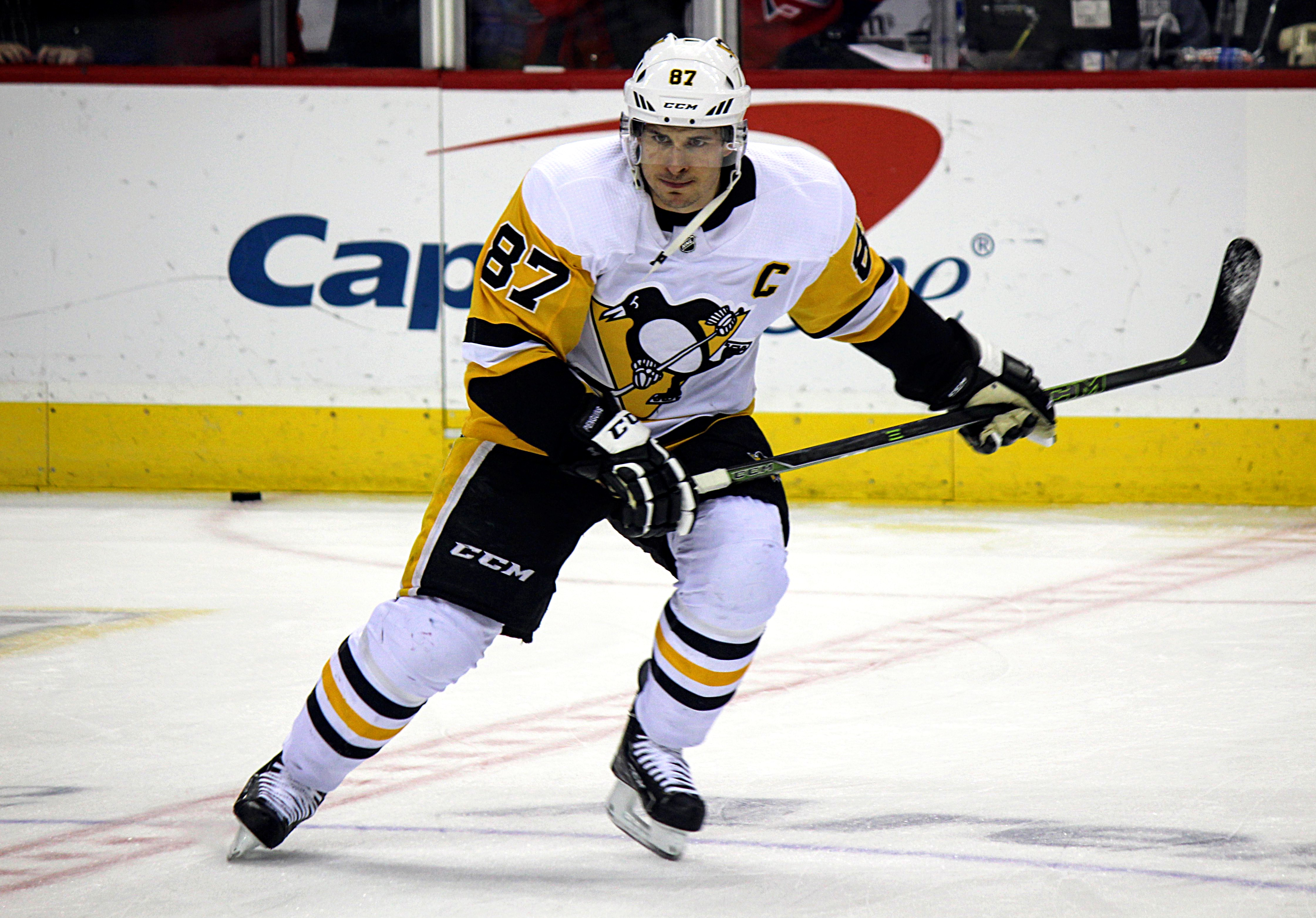
Sidney Crosby wearing the Pittsburgh Penguins black (left) and white (right) uniforms in 2018.

In the NHL each team is currently required to have two uniform designs: one with a white base (or sometimes historically, a light colour), and one with a darker-coloured base. From the 1970–71 season to the 2002–03 season, NHL teams wore white or yellow colours at home and the darker colours on the road. When the Third Jersey Program was introduced in the 1995–96 season, some teams wore third jerseys at home, thus requiring the road team to wear white. This problem was rectified at the start of the 2003–04 season, as NHL teams started to wear the dark colour at home and the white for road games; there are occasional single-game exceptions. The only elements allowed by NHL rules to be interchangeable between the two uniforms is the pants and gloves.

In the minor leagues, teams historically wore light colours (white or yellow) at home and dark colours on the road.

Original hockey jerseys were actually heavily knit sweaters. They were light colours for home games and dark colours for road games. The reason dark-coloured sweaters were part of the "road" uniform was to hide the dirt the sweaters accumulated. The sweaters were not washed during road trips. The light or white sweaters were "home" uniforms as the visiting teams necessarily wore the dark. This tradition fits the needs of "home/away" distinctions necessary for black-and-white television.

== Netball ==
Away colours are used by Jamaica and Australia, two top international teams who both have yellow home kits. Jamaica's change kit is all-black, Australia's is all-green. When the teams meet, one usually changes its kits but there have been games such as a 2011 Test where each team wore predominantly yellow, with Jamaica in black skirts.

Alternative colours are also used where required in the Australasian ANZ Championship.

== Rugby union ==
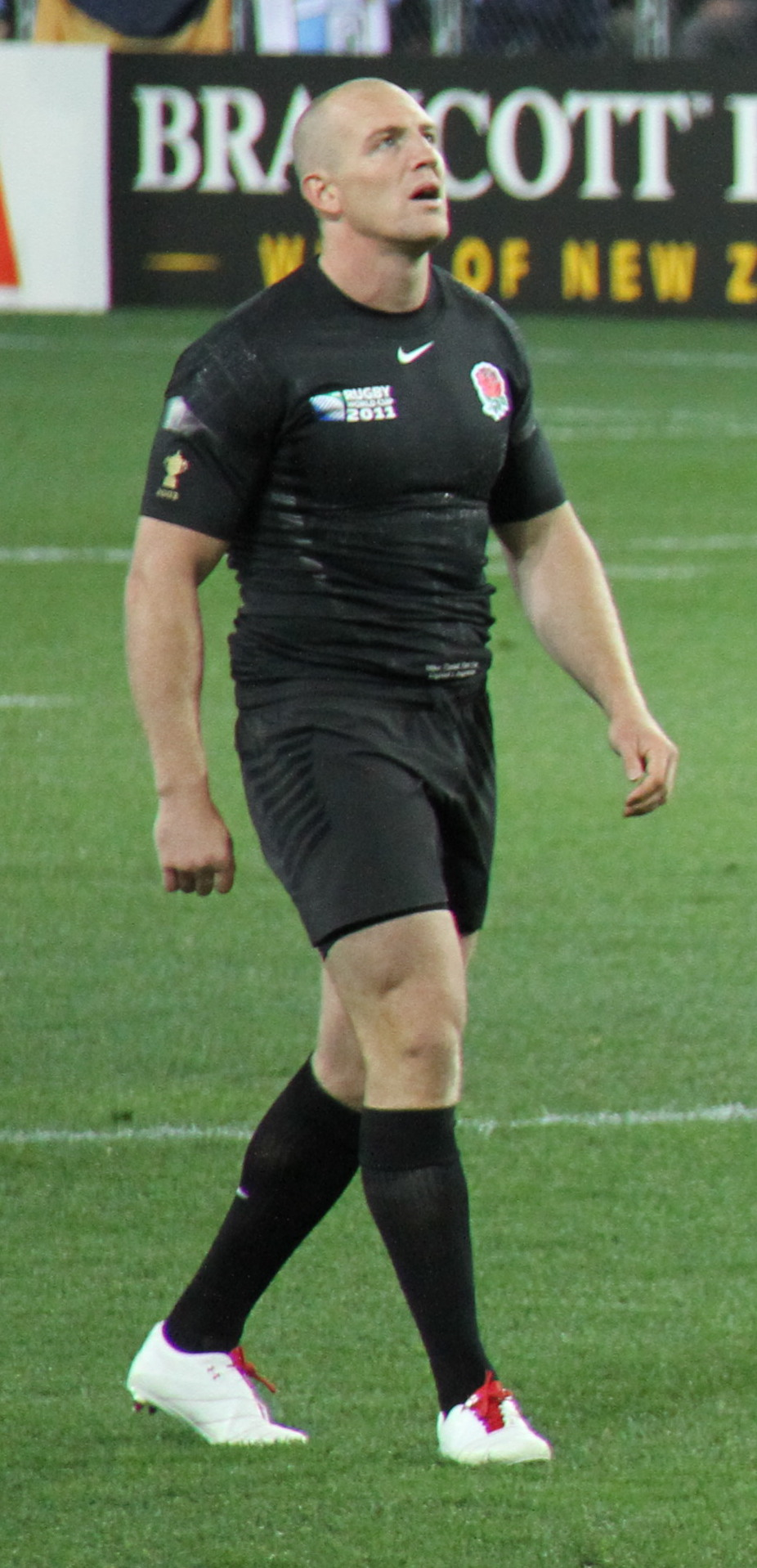
Mike Tindall wearing England's black away kit at the 2011 Rugby World Cup

It is traditional in rugby (as it was in association football prior to 1921) for the home team to change in the event of a clash. This stems partly from teams touring overseas; it was easier for the home side to get an alternative kit. The World Rugby rules for tours do not state this outright: it is the responsibility of the WR CEO or representative "to resolve the matter", but "in the absence of any agreement to the contrary, the Host Union shall be entitled to wear its home kit." In English RFU level 3 to 5 competition, if there is a clash the away team must change.

At Rugby World Cups, colour clashes are decided by a coin-toss for first choice of kits. In the 2007 quarter-final between France and New Zealand, the recently redesigned French kit was dark blue and black, and clashed with the All Blacks' kit. The toss went in favour of France, and New Zealand wore silver shirts in the game in Cardiff. However, in the 2011 Rugby World Cup final between those teams, France won the toss and chose to play in its white away kit. France's team manager Jo Maso said this decision was because of "the welcome they'd received from the people of New Zealand, the faultless organisation of the tournament and the honour and pleasure of playing... [at] Eden Park".

England used an all-black second kit at the 2011 World Cup, which caused controversy in the host nation, as black is the home colour of New Zealand. England wore the kit in one tournament match, against Argentina. Critics in England in 2010 said the team was changing away kits unnecessarily and too often as a "marketing ploy". Australia, on the other hand, has rarely worn an away kit except against Romania; a white jersey would have been worn in 2011.

In international rugby, the need for second kits arises most often in the Six Nations, where Scotland, France and Italy all play in different shades of blue. The tournament takes the form of a single round-robin with home advantage alternating each year, and it is scheduled so that each of the three aforementioned sides plays one of the other two at home and the other away in a given season. In turn, this means that each of these three sides will play one home game in its alternative jersey. These have traditionally been white, but in the 2015 Six Nations Scotland and France adopted red as their alternate colour.

== International rules ==
Ireland's green jersey is complemented by two away jerseys, one which is white in colour and one which is navy in colour.
