= Climate of the Tampa Bay area =

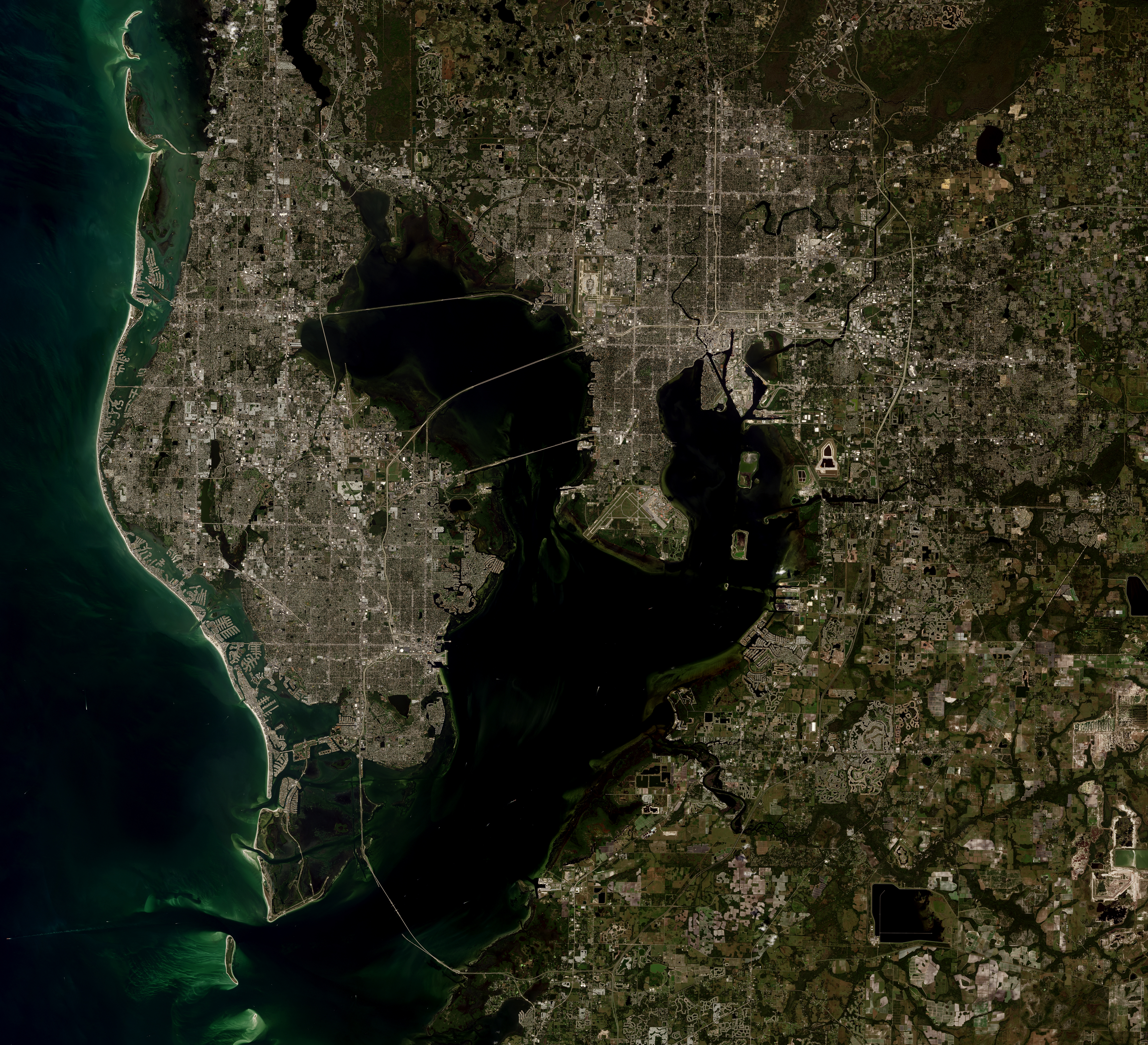
Landsat 8 image of Tampa Bay Region

The Tampa Bay area has a humid subtropical climate (Köppen Cfa), closely bordering a tropical climate near the waterfront areas. There are two basic seasons in the Tampa Bay area, a hot and wet season from May through October, and a mild and dry season from November through April.

Nearly two-thirds of the annual precipitation falls in the months of June through September. The area is listed by the United States Department of Agriculture (USDA) as being in hardiness zone 10a as well as hardiness zone 10b along the immediate coast and in peninsular Pinellas; which is about the northern limit of where coconut palms and royal palms can be grown. Highs usually range between 65 and 95 °F (18–35 °C) year round. The all-time record high for both Tampa and St. Petersburg is exactly 100 °F (38 °C), a temperature that Tampa officially reached for the first time on July 27, 2025.

Pinellas County lies on a peninsula between Tampa Bay and the Gulf of Mexico, and much of the city of Tampa lies on a smaller peninsula jutting out into Tampa Bay. This proximity to large bodies of water both moderates temperatures and introduces large amounts of humidity into the atmosphere. In general, the local communities farthest from the coast have larger temperature ranges, both during a single day and throughout the seasons of the year.

== Seasonal weather ==
Tampa

Climate chart (precipitation, max. and min. temperature)
J	F	M	A	M	J	J	A	S	O	N	D
2.7 71 53	2.6 74 56	2.5 78 59	2.6 83 65	2.6 88 70	7.4 91 75	7.8 91 77	9 91 77	6.1 90 75	2.3 86 69	1.4 79 61	2.6 74 56
- █ Average max. and min. temperatures in °F
- █ Precipitation totals in inches
- Source: NOAA 1991-2020 Climate Normals
Metric conversion
J	F	M	A	M	J	J	A	S	O	N	D
67 22 12	67 23 13	64 25 15	65 28 18	66 31 21	187 33 24	197 33 25	229 33 25	155 32 24	59 30 21	36 26 16	65 23 13
- █ Average max. and min. temperatures in °C
- █ Precipitation totals in mm

=== Wet season ===
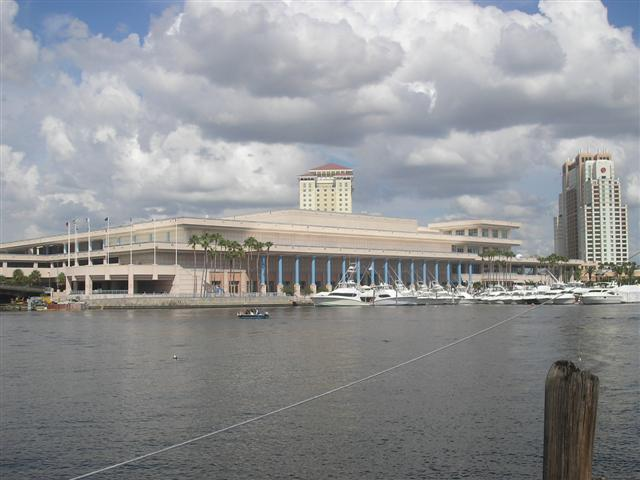
Cumulus clouds building over the Tampa Convention Center on a summer afternoon

The warm and rainy season typically begins in late May and runs through October. Average high temperatures are in the low 90s °F (around 32 °C) with lows in the mid-70s °F (around 24 °C) during this period, and the combination of warm temperatures and high humidity brings an almost daily chance of rain and thunderstorms, especially in the afternoon. Day-to-day weather is remarkably consistent, with summertime average highs and lows within five to ten degrees of the record high and low for any given date.

In the typical summertime weather pattern, the combination of daytime heating and the interaction of the Gulf and Atlantic sea breezes creates thermal-fueled cumulus clouds over the Florida peninsula. These can produce rain showers or grow into towering thunderheads, either of which tend to drift westward on upper-level winds produced by the Bermuda high, a semi-permanent weather feature over the Atlantic Ocean that strengthens during the summer months. These storms can form anywhere across Central Florida from the interior near Orlando to along the west coast, depending on the wind and local weather conditions. Wherever they develop, Tampa's most common summer weather pattern results in afternoon thundershowers that usually rain themselves out by sunset, though on occasion, a storm cell will persist and drift west to the Gulf of Mexico to produce nighttime lightning displays visible from local beaches.

A less common summer weather pattern is for prevailing westerly winds to cause overnight thundershowers to form offshore along a land breeze front. These storms bring morning rain to the Tampa area before moving inland later in the day, reversing the more typical timing. While afternoon storms are usually followed by a clear and cooler evening, morning rain often results in higher than usual humidity levels and the possibility of more storms developing in the afternoon.

Summer storms typically bring brief periods of heavy rain and gusty winds with frequent cloud-to-ground lightning. They can grow severe, bringing strong straight-line winds, small hail, and torrential rain, and an occasional tornado. (While Florida sees the highest number of tornadoes per square mile of any state, the majority are small, weak, and short-lived compared to those seen in mid-western states.) Waterspouts sometimes form when outflows from adjacent storm cells interact and begin to rotate over water, creating a funnel cloud over Tampa Bay or off the gulf beaches. These features usually stay offshore but occasionally reach land as a short-lived weak tornado.

The Tampa Bay area is sometimes referred to as the "Lightning Capital of the World" for its frequent thunderstorms. Though Central Florida receives as much lightning during the summer months as the world's true lightning leaders such as the Lake Victoria region of Africa and the central Amazon River Basin, thunderstorms are much less common from about October to May, so the area from Tampa to Orlando is more accurately deemed the "Lightning Capital of North America". An average of about a dozen people are killed by lightning in Florida every year, with several annually in the Tampa area., and TECO Energy, Tampa's primary electric utility, spends several millions dollars annually to repair transformers and other equipment damaged by lightning strikes. University of Florida lightning expert Martin A. Uman has calculated that the average resident is within a half-mile of 10 to 15 lightning strikes every year.

=== Dry season ===
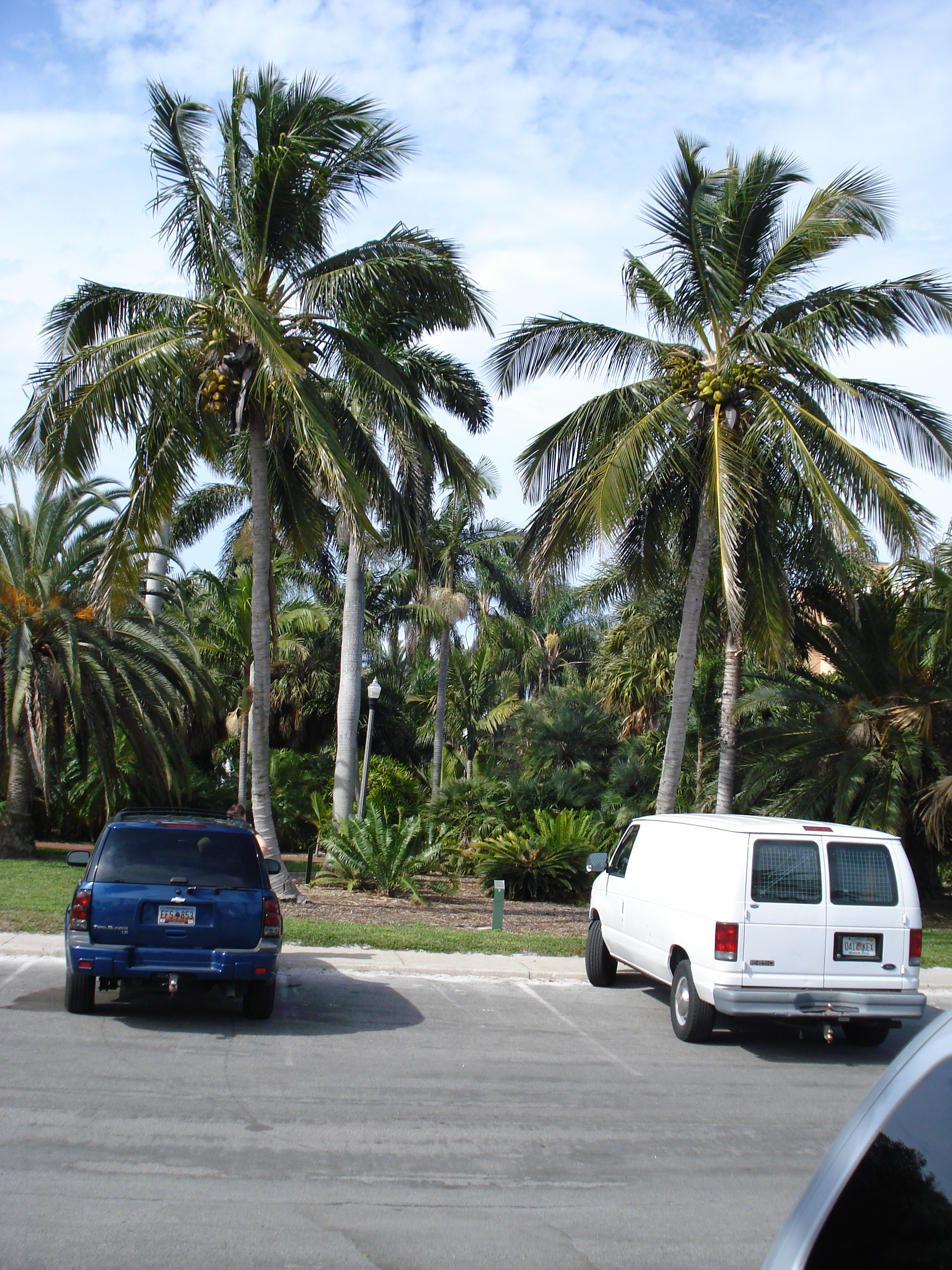
Coconut palms at the Gizella Kopsick Palm Arboretum in northeast St. Petersburg.

The dry season often begins in early November and can last into early May. The local weather during these months is normally sunny, mild, and quite dry, with a general cooling trend through the fall and a slow increase in temperatures starting in February. Highs during the coolest part of the winter average around 70 °F (21 °C), usually with sunny skies. The occasional passage of a cold front will bring rain followed by a few days of cooler temperatures. Lows rarely reach freezing 32 °F (0 °C), an occurrence which happens, on average, once every other year in areas away from the water and less frequently in areas on Tampa Bay or the Gulf of Mexico. While deep freezes are very infrequent, serious cold snaps are a significant concern due to the diverse range of freeze-sensitive agriculture and aquaculture industries in the area as well as tropical landscaping such as coconut palms and royal palms.

Frozen precipitation is very rare in the Tampa Bay area. The only known measurable snowfall in Tampa after 1900 occurred on January 19, 1977. While the accumulation amounted to less than 0.5 inches (13 mm), the city is so unaccustomed to snow that public schools closed for the day and many businesses and roadways closed until it melted away that afternoon. Many residents of southern Pinellas County reported a light snowfall on December 23, 1989. However, no snow fell at official weather stations, and the weather record indicates that light sleet fell on St. Petersburg that day.

The winter of 2009–2010 was one of the coldest in local history. Both Tampa and St. Petersburg set records for consecutive days in which the high temperature did not reach 60 °F (16 °C), and Tampa experienced ten consecutive days with a low temperature below freezing. Much of the area received a "wintry mix" of rain and sleet on January 9–10.

According to The Weather Channel, Tampa's all-time record low temperature is 18 °F (−8 °C) and St. Petersburg's is 20 °F (−7 °C), both occurring during the same cold snap on December 13, 1962.

During El Niño, the Tampa Bay area receives cooler and wetter conditions during the dry season while during La Niña, the Tampa Bay area becomes drier and warmer than normal.

=== Precipitation and sunshine trends ===
Due to the frequent summer thunderstorms, Tampa has a pronounced wet season, receiving a yearly average of about 30 inches (760 mm) of rain from June to September but only about 19 inches (480 mm) during the remaining eight months of the year combined. The historical averages late in the wet season are augmented by the passage of tropical cyclones, which can drop several inches of rain in just a few hours. Outside of the summer rainy season, most of the area's precipitation is delivered by occasional weather fronts - cold fronts often bring brief but intense rain while warm fronts tend to bring light rain over longer periods of time.

Precipitation and temperature averages for the city of Tampa itself tend to fall near the median for the area. Communities to the interior tend to receive a bit more rain and experience slightly wider temperature fluctuations, while those on the Gulf coast tend to receive a bit less rain and less pronounced temperature differences, both in a single day and through the year.

The area receives plentiful sunshine throughout the year, averaging a total of 2920 hours, or 66.7% of the possible total. The daily sunshine amount is highest in May, when the sun's angle of incidence brings more hours of daylight but the rainy season has not yet begun.

== Tropical systems ==
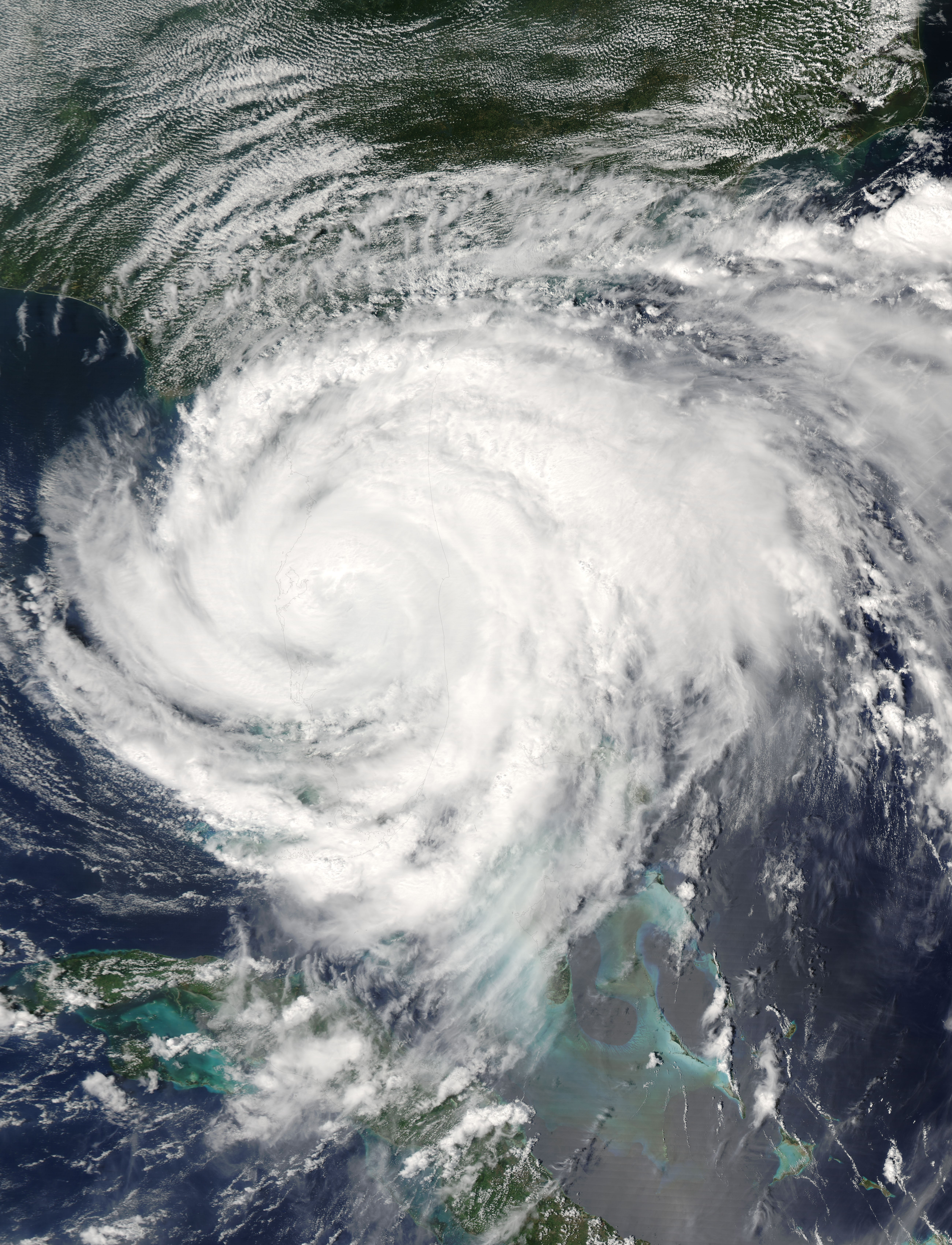
Hurricane Frances over Florida in 2004

June through November is hurricane season in the Atlantic Basin and Caribbean Sea, with the most tropical activity occurring between mid-August to mid-October. Rain dropped by tropical systems is an important component of the area's annual precipitation and is vital for replenishing the water supply of communities around Tampa Bay.

The area is threatened by tropical systems almost every year and feels some effect from passing storms several times per decade. However, due to Tampa Bay's location on the west coast and the typical steering winds for storms, landfall in the area is uncommon, with estimates of the probability of a hurricane making landfall in the Tampa Bay area during any given year ranging from 1 in 25 to 1 in 50. The village of Tampa was devastated by the Great Gale of 1848, and the area suffered major damage during the Tampa Bay Hurricane of 1921. Since then, however, the immediate Tampa Bay area has not had a direct landfall from a hurricane, though nearby Manatee County has seen two - a minimal hurricane in 1946 and the much more powerful Hurricane Milton in 2024.

=== 21st century storms ===
The 2004 Atlantic Hurricane Season was historically busy for the Tampa Bay area, with four storms affecting the area: Frances, Jeanne, Charley, and to a lesser extent, Ivan. Jeanne and Frances passed over Tampa as tropical storms after making their way across the state from the east coast. Charley was forecast to make a direct hit on Tampa Bay from the south-southwest, which would have been the worst-case scenario for local storm surge flooding. But the storm unexpectedly veered to the east-northeast and brought only tropical storm force winds to the Tampa Bay area while devastating the Ft. Myers/Port Charlotte area instead. Ivan also threatened the area as it moved north up the eastern Gulf of Mexico as a category 5 storm. It remained well to the west of peninsular Florida, however, and brought only a bit of rain and wind to Tampa Bay before eventually slamming into coastal Alabama and the Florida Panhandle.

On September 10, 2017, Hurricane Irma struck the Florida Keys and made landfall near Marco Island in southwest Florida as a Category 3 storm. Irma moved north up the length of the Florida peninsula and had weakened to a Category 1 storm by the time it arrived in central Florida. On the night of September 10 / 11, the eye passed east of Tampa through eastern Hillsborough County, bringing sustained tropical storm winds and occasional hurricane force gusts to the entire Tampa Bay area. Irma caused significant damage to the region, particularly to the electrical grid.

==== 2024: Debby, Helene and Milton ====
The 2024 Atlantic hurricane season was the most destructive and deadly in over a century for the Tampa Bay area, with three systems causing serious damage.

- Hurricane Debby paralleled Florida's west coast on its track towards eventual landfall in the panhandle, and it was well offshore as a tropical storm when it made its closest approach to Tampa Bay on August 4. But while Debby did not bring strong winds to the Tampa region, its rain bands remained over the area for hours as it moved south to north and dumped up to 14 inches (36 cm) of rain in less than 36 hours. The torrential precipitation caused extensive fresh water flooding in low lying areas that lingered due to a moderate storm surge.
- Hurricane Helene also passed well to the west of the Florida peninsula as it moved towards an eventual landfall in the panhandle. However, it was a powerful Category 4 storm at its closest approach on September 27, and due to the angle of the coast in relation to the rotation of the storm, it produced the highest storm surges in at least a century across the Tampa Bay area. The barrier island beaches of Pinellas County and coastal neighborhoods of south Tampa were hit particularly hard, with up to 8 feet (2.4 m) of water rushing into homes and businesses in areas which had never previously flooded. Damage across the area was estimated in the billion of dollars and 12 people were killed, mainly residents who chose not to evacuate despite surge warnings.
- Hurricane Milton made the closest landfall to Tampa Bay of any hurricane since 1921. It came from an unusual direction, forming the southwestern Gulf of Mexico in early October and quickly strengthening into one of the most powerful storms in history as it passed by the Yucatan Peninsula on an eastward track. Some track predictions brought the storm into the mouth of Tampa Bay, a worst case scenario which would have caused storm surges of over 10 feet (3.0 m) across much of the coast. However, Milton veered to the southeast just hours before landfall and slammed into Siesta Key in Manatee County as a powerful category 3 hurricane on October 9. While landfall to the south greatly reduced storm surges in Tampa Bay, sustained hurricane force winds affected the entire area and caused extensive power outages and other damage, most dramatically in downtown St. Petersburg, where winds of over 100 mph (160 km/h) sent a large construction crane crashing into the Tampa Bay Times building and shredded the roof of Tropicana Field. The situation was exacerbated by the fact that many local communities had not finished debris cleanup from Hurricane Helene, which had caused major damage less than three weeks previously.

Overall, the 2024 hurricane season caused an estimated $5 billion in damage across the Tampa Bay area.

== Tampa data ==
Climate data for Tampa, Florida (Tampa Int'l), 1991−2020 normals, (Note: Mean monthly maxima and minima (i.e. the highest and lowest temperature readings during an entire month or year) calculated based on data at said location from 1991 to 2020.) extremes 1890−present (Note: Official records for Tampa were kept at downtown from April 1890 to December 1940, Peter O. Knight Airport from January 1941 to 5 June 1946, and at Tampa Int'l since 7 June 1946. For more information, see ThreadEx)
Month	Jan	Feb	Mar	Apr	May	Jun	Jul	Aug	Sep	Oct	Nov	Dec	Year
Record high °F (°C)	86 (30)	89 (32)	92 (33)	96 (36)	98 (37)	99 (37)	100 (38)	98 (37)	96 (36)	95 (35)	92 (33)	86 (30)	100 (38)
Mean maximum °F (°C)	81.8 (27.7)	82.5 (28.1)	85.4 (29.7)	89.0 (31.7)	93.4 (34.1)	95.0 (35.0)	94.8 (34.9)	94.8 (34.9)	93.8 (34.3)	91.1 (32.8)	86.4 (30.2)	82.5 (28.1)	96.2 (35.7)
Mean daily maximum °F (°C)	71.3 (21.8)	74.0 (23.3)	77.8 (25.4)	83.0 (28.3)	88.3 (31.3)	90.5 (32.5)	91.0 (32.8)	91.2 (32.9)	90.2 (32.3)	85.6 (29.8)	78.9 (26.1)	73.9 (23.3)	83.0 (28.3)
Daily mean °F (°C)	62.0 (16.7)	64.7 (18.2)	68.6 (20.3)	73.9 (23.3)	79.5 (26.4)	82.9 (28.3)	83.8 (28.8)	84.0 (28.9)	82.7 (28.2)	77.4 (25.2)	69.8 (21.0)	64.9 (18.3)	74.5 (23.6)
Mean daily minimum °F (°C)	52.8 (11.6)	55.5 (13.1)	59.3 (15.2)	64.8 (18.2)	70.6 (21.4)	75.4 (24.1)	76.6 (24.8)	76.8 (24.9)	75.3 (24.1)	69.2 (20.7)	60.7 (15.9)	55.9 (13.3)	66.1 (18.9)
Mean minimum °F (°C)	34.4 (1.3)	38.8 (3.8)	43.4 (6.3)	51.6 (10.9)	61.2 (16.2)	69.9 (21.1)	71.8 (22.1)	72.5 (22.5)	69.2 (20.7)	54.9 (12.7)	45.3 (7.4)	39.5 (4.2)	32.8 (0.4)
Record low °F (°C)	21 (−6)	22 (−6)	29 (−2)	38 (3)	49 (9)	53 (12)	63 (17)	66 (19)	54 (12)	40 (4)	23 (−5)	18 (−8)	18 (−8)
Average precipitation inches (mm)	2.65 (67)	2.62 (67)	2.52 (64)	2.55 (65)	2.60 (66)	7.37 (187)	7.75 (197)	9.03 (229)	6.09 (155)	2.34 (59)	1.40 (36)	2.56 (65)	49.48 (1,257)
Average precipitation days (≥ 0.01 in)	7.1	6.6	5.9	5.7	6.2	13.3	16.6	16.2	12.8	7.2	4.6	6.0	108.2
Average relative humidity (%)	74.9	73.0	71.8	69.0	69.8	74.4	76.6	78.4	77.6	74.2	75.0	75.0	74.1
Average dew point °F (°C)	50.2 (10.1)	50.7 (10.4)	55.6 (13.1)	59.2 (15.1)	64.9 (18.3)	70.9 (21.6)	72.7 (22.6)	73.0 (22.8)	71.2 (21.8)	64.2 (17.9)	57.7 (14.3)	52.3 (11.3)	61.9 (16.6)
Mean monthly sunshine hours	213.9	231.7	260.4	279.0	337.9	321.0	334.8	294.5	267.0	235.6	195.0	195.3	3,166.1
Mean daily sunshine hours	6.9	8.2	8.4	9.3	10.9	10.7	10.8	9.5	8.9	7.6	6.5	6.3	8.7
Mean daily daylight hours	10.6	11.2	12.0	12.9	13.5	13.9	13.7	13.1	12.3	11.5	10.8	10.4	12.2
Percentage possible sunshine	65	73	70	72	81	77	79	73	72	66	60	61	71
Average ultraviolet index	4.4	6.1	8.0	9.6	10.1	10.4	10.5	10.1	8.7	6.7	4.8	4.0	7.7
Source 1: NOAA (relative humidity, dew point and sun 1961−1990)
Source 2: UV Index Today (1995–2022) Source 3: Weather Atlas (sunshine data)

See or edit raw graph data.

== See also ==
- Climate of Florida
- Climate of Miami
