= Climate of Miami =

Miami

Climate chart (precipitation, max. and min. temperature)
J	F	M	A	M	J	J	A	S	O	N	D
1.8 76 61	2.2 78 63	2.5 81 66	3.4 84 70	6.3 87 73	11 89 76	7.4 91 78	9.6 91 78	10 89 77	7.7 86 74	3.5 81 68	2.4 78 64
- █ Average max. and min. temperatures in °F
- █ Precipitation totals in inches
- Source: NOAA/NWS
Metric conversion
J	F	M	A	M	J	J	A	S	O	N	D
46 25 16	55 26 17	62 27 19	85 29 21	161 30 23	267 32 25	187 33 25	243 33 25	260 32 25	194 30 23	90 27 20	62 26 18
- █ Average max. and min. temperatures in °C
- █ Precipitation totals in mm

The southern tip of South Florida has a tropical climate, according to the Köppen climate classification, with a hot and wet season in summer, and a warm, dry season in winter.

The climate of Miami is classified as having a tropical monsoon climate with hot and humid summers; short, warm winters; and a marked drier season in the winter. Its sea-level elevation, coastal location, position just north of the Tropic of Cancer, and proximity to the Gulf Stream shape its climate.

With January averaging 68.6 °F (20.3 °C), winter features warm temperatures; cool air usually settles after the passage of a cold front, which produces much of the little rainfall. Lows sometimes fall to or below 50 °F (10 °C), with an average 3 such occurrences annually, but rarely 40 °F (4 °C); from 1981 to 2010, temperatures reached that level in only eight calendar years. Highs generally reach 70 °F (21 °C) or higher, and fail to do so on only an average of 12 days annually.

The Rainy season officially begins May 15th and continues until October 15th. During this period, highs are in the mid 80s to mid 90s (29–35 °C), accompanied by high humidity, though the heat is often relieved by afternoon thunderstorms or a sea breeze that develops off the Atlantic Ocean, which then allow lower temperatures, but conditions still remain very muggy. Much of the year's 67.41 inches (1,710 mm) of rainfall occurs during this period. Extreme temperatures range from 27 F on February 3, 1917, to 100 °F on July 21, 1942 and August 18, 2026, (−1.8 to 38 °C), the two only triple-digit (°F) readings on record; the more recent freezing temperature seen at Miami International Airport was on December 25, 1989. The highest daily minimum temperature is 84 °F (29 °C) on August 4, 1993 and September 7, 1897 (although the corresponding record for Miami Beach is 90 °F or 32 °C on July 17, 2001), and conversely, the lowest daily maximum temperature is 32 °F (0 °C) on February 19, 1899.

While Miami has never officially recorded any accumulating snowfall since records have been kept, there were non-accumulating snow flurries in some parts of the city on January 19, 1977 during the cold wave of January 1977. Weather conditions for the area around Miami were recorded sporadically from 1839 until 1900, with many years-long gaps. A cooperative temperature and rainfall recording site was established in December 1900 in what is now Downtown Miami. An official Weather Bureau Office opened in Miami in June 1911. A record setting 12-day cold snap in January 2010 was the coldest period since at least the 1940s.

Miami receives abundant rainfall, one of the highest among major cities in the United States. Most of this rainfall occurs from mid-May through early October. Miami has an average annual rainfall of 61.9 inches (1,570 mm), whereas nearby Fort Lauderdale and Miami Beach receive 66.7 inches (1,690 mm) and 57.18 inches (1,450 mm), respectively, which demonstrates the high local variability in rainfall rates.

Miami reports more thunderstorms than most US cities, with about eighty days per year having thunder reported. These storms are often strong, with frequent lightning and very heavy rain. Occasionally, they can be severe with damaging straight line winds and large hail. Tornadoes and waterspouts sometimes occur, although violent tornadoes of the type seen in other parts of the United States are rare in Florida.

During El Niño events, Miami becomes cooler than normal during the dry season with above average precipitation. During La Niña, Miami becomes warmer and drier than normal.

While the climate for much of Florida is humid subtropical, much of South Florida qualifies as one of several tropical classifications (Köppen Aw, As, Am, or Af). with the Tropical parts of Southeastern Florida falling into USDA zone 10b to 12a for plant hardiness, where annual extreme low temperatures range from 35 to 55 °F (2 to 13 °C), versus zones 9a-10b in Central Florida, and zones 8b-9b in northern Florida. With global warming, the urban heat island effect, as well as the warm waters provided by the Gulf Stream, the barrier islands and coastal portions of the metroarea including Miami Beach & Miami, made it into hardiness zone 11a by 2012. With most Miami-Dade cities (like Hialeah, Coral Gables, etc) joining in the 2023 USDA update Miami Beach has virtually no freezing weather in its history and few instances of sub-40 °F (4 °C) weather.

== Data ==
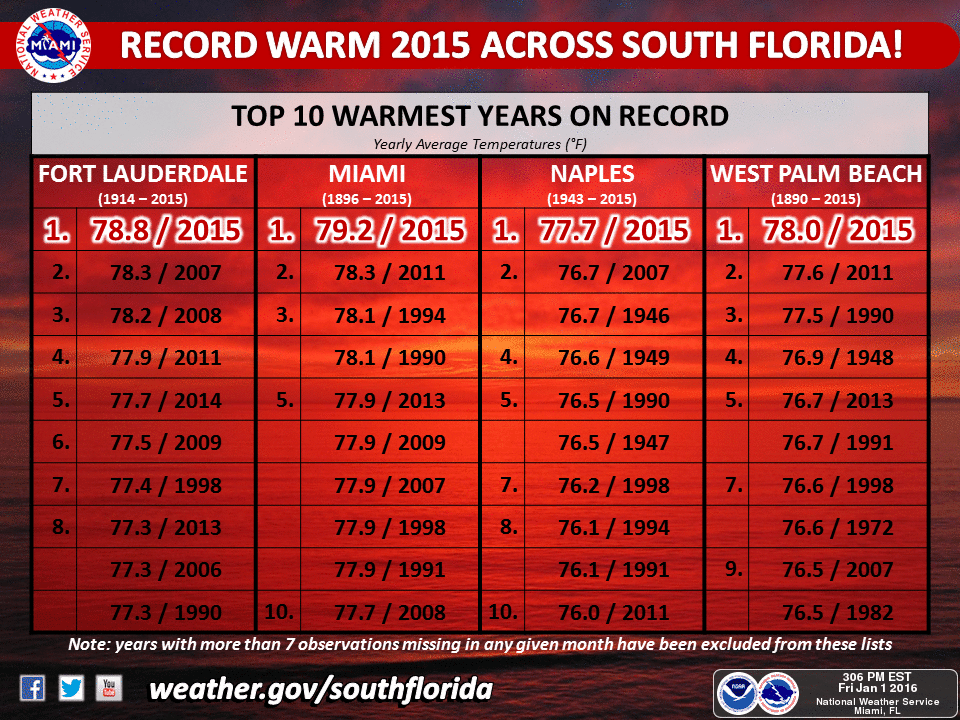
In 2015, Florida experienced a record-breaking year for temperatures with four South Florida cities breaking records by a wide margin.

Climate data for Miami International Airport, 1991−2020 normals, (Note: Mean monthly maxima and minima (i.e. the highest and lowest temperature readings during an entire month or year) calculated based on data at said location from 1991 to 2020.) extremes 1895−present (Note: Official records for Miami were kept at the Lemon City from September 1895 to November 1900, the Miami COOP from December 1900 to May 1911, the Weather Bureau Office from June 1911 to February 1937, at various locations in and around the city from March 1937 to July 1942, and at Miami Int'l since August 1942. For more information, see ThreadEx.)
Month	Jan	Feb	Mar	Apr	May	Jun	Jul	Aug	Sep	Oct	Nov	Dec	Year
Record high °F (°C)	88 (31)	89 (32)	93 (34)	97 (36)	98 (37)	98 (37)	100 (38)	100 (38)	97 (36)	95 (35)	91 (33)	89 (32)	100 (38)
Mean maximum °F (°C)	84.4 (29.1)	85.8 (29.9)	89.0 (31.7)	90.7 (32.6)	92.8 (33.8)	94.2 (34.6)	94.7 (34.8)	94.5 (34.7)	93.2 (34.0)	90.9 (32.7)	87.0 (30.6)	84.9 (29.4)	95.8 (35.4)
Mean daily maximum °F (°C)	76.2 (24.6)	78.2 (25.7)	80.6 (27.0)	83.6 (28.7)	86.7 (30.4)	89.3 (31.8)	90.6 (32.6)	90.7 (32.6)	89.0 (31.7)	85.9 (29.9)	81.3 (27.4)	78.2 (25.7)	84.2 (29.0)
Daily mean °F (°C)	68.6 (20.3)	70.7 (21.5)	73.1 (22.8)	76.7 (24.8)	80.1 (26.7)	82.8 (28.2)	84.1 (28.9)	84.2 (29.0)	83.0 (28.3)	80.1 (26.7)	74.8 (23.8)	71.2 (21.8)	77.4 (25.2)
Mean daily minimum °F (°C)	61.0 (16.1)	63.2 (17.3)	65.6 (18.7)	69.8 (21.0)	73.4 (23.0)	76.3 (24.6)	77.5 (25.3)	77.7 (25.4)	76.9 (24.9)	74.2 (23.4)	68.3 (20.2)	64.3 (17.9)	70.7 (21.5)
Mean minimum °F (°C)	45.1 (7.3)	48.5 (9.2)	52.3 (11.3)	59.6 (15.3)	66.7 (19.3)	71.5 (21.9)	72.5 (22.5)	72.8 (22.7)	72.7 (22.6)	65.0 (18.3)	55.7 (13.2)	49.7 (9.8)	42.5 (5.8)
Record low °F (°C)	28 (−2)	27 (−3)	32 (0)	39 (4)	50 (10)	60 (16)	66 (19)	67 (19)	62 (17)	45 (7)	36 (2)	30 (−1)	27 (−3)
Average precipitation inches (mm)	1.83 (46)	2.15 (55)	2.46 (62)	3.36 (85)	6.32 (161)	10.51 (267)	7.36 (187)	9.58 (243)	10.22 (260)	7.65 (194)	3.53 (90)	2.44 (62)	67.41 (1,712)
Average precipitation days (≥ 0.01 in)	7.7	6.5	6.3	6.9	10.8	17.6	17.3	19.4	18.1	13.8	8.6	8.0	141.0
Average relative humidity (%)	72.7	70.9	69.5	67.3	71.6	76.2	74.8	76.2	77.8	74.9	73.8	72.5	73.2
Average dew point °F (°C)	57.6 (14.2)	57.6 (14.2)	60.4 (15.8)	62.6 (17.0)	67.6 (19.8)	72.0 (22.2)	73.0 (22.8)	73.8 (23.2)	73.2 (22.9)	68.7 (20.4)	63.9 (17.7)	59.2 (15.1)	65.8 (18.8)
Mean monthly sunshine hours	219.8	216.9	277.2	293.8	301.3	288.7	308.7	288.3	262.2	260.2	220.8	216.1	3,154
Percentage possible sunshine	66	69	75	77	72	70	73	71	71	73	68	66	71
Average ultraviolet index	5.1	6.7	8.6	10.2	10.5	10.7	10.8	10.5	9.3	7.1	5.3	4.5	8.2
Source 1: NOAA (relative humidity, dew point and sun 1961–1990), The Weather Channel
Source 2: UV Index Today (1995 to 2022), Thunderstorm days (1961 to 1990)

Climate data for Miami Beach, 1991−2020 normals
Month	Jan	Feb	Mar	Apr	May	Jun	Jul	Aug	Sep	Oct	Nov	Dec	Year
Record high °F (°C)	87 (31)	89 (32)	92 (33)	94 (34)	98 (37)	97 (36)	98 (37)	98 (37)	96 (36)	95 (35)	92 (33)	86 (30)	98 (37)
Mean daily maximum °F (°C)	73.6 (23.1)	74.8 (23.8)	76.5 (24.7)	79.6 (26.4)	82.7 (28.2)	86.0 (30.0)	87.8 (31.0)	88.1 (31.2)	87.0 (30.6)	83.7 (28.7)	78.9 (26.1)	76.1 (24.5)	81.2 (27.3)
Daily mean °F (°C)	67.4 (19.7)	69.0 (20.6)	70.9 (21.6)	74.7 (23.7)	78.2 (25.7)	81.3 (27.4)	82.9 (28.3)	83.1 (28.4)	82.1 (27.8)	79.0 (26.1)	73.8 (23.2)	70.3 (21.3)	76.1 (24.5)
Mean daily minimum °F (°C)	61.2 (16.2)	63.3 (17.4)	65.2 (18.4)	69.8 (21.0)	73.6 (23.1)	76.5 (24.7)	78.0 (25.6)	78.1 (25.6)	77.2 (25.1)	74.4 (23.6)	68.6 (20.3)	64.6 (18.1)	70.9 (21.6)
Record low °F (°C)	32 (0)	37 (3)	32 (0)	46 (8)	58 (14)	65 (18)	66 (19)	67 (19)	67 (19)	54 (12)	39 (4)	32 (0)	32 (0)
Average rainfall inches (mm)	2.33 (59)	2.27 (58)	2.47 (63)	3.44 (87)	4.94 (125)	7.76 (197)	5.98 (152)	7.51 (191)	8.45 (215)	6.49 (165)	3.29 (84)	2.25 (57)	57.18 (1,453)
Average rainy days (≥ 0.01 in)	6.7	6.0	6.9	6.0	8.9	14.5	12.1	14.0	14.9	11.2	8.1	6.9	116.2
Source: NOAA (extremes 1927−present)

This chart shows the average coastal ocean water temperature by month in degrees Fahrenheit for Miami Beach based on historical measurements.

January	February	March	April 1−15	April 16−30	May 1−15	May 16−31	June 1−15	June 16−30	July 1−15	July 16−31	August 1−15	August 16−31	September 1−15	September 16−30	October 1−15	October 16−31	November	December
71 °F (22 °C)	73 °F (23 °C)	75 °F (24 °C)	78 °F (26 °C)	78 °F (26 °C)	80 °F (27 °C)	81 °F (27 °C)	84 °F (29 °C)	85 °F (29 °C)	86 °F (30 °C)	86 °F (30 °C)	86 °F (30 °C)	84 °F (29 °C)	84 °F (29 °C)	83 °F (28 °C)	83 °F (28 °C)	79 °F (26 °C)	76 °F (24 °C)	73 °F (23 °C)

See or edit raw graph data.

== Hurricanes ==
The Atlantic hurricane season officially runs from June 1 through November 30, although hurricanes can develop beyond those dates. The most likely time for Miami to be hit is during the peak of the Cape Verde season which is mid-August through the end of September. Due to its location between two major bodies of water known for tropical activity, Miami is also statistically the most likely major city in the world to be struck by a hurricane, trailed closely by Nassau, Bahamas, and Havana, Cuba.

Despite this, the City of Miami has not been directly hit by the eye of a hurricane since Hurricane Cleo in 1964. However, many other hurricanes have affected the city, namely the Great Miami Hurricane in 1926, Betsy in 1965, Andrew in 1992, Irene in 1999, and Hurricanes Katrina and Wilma in 2005, and Hurricane Irma in 2017. At least 35 direct and 26 indirect deaths in Florida were attributed to Wilma. Additionally throughout Florida, at least 84 people died in storm-related incidents as a result of Irma.

In addition, a tropical depression in October 2000 passed over the city, causing record rainfall and flooding. The storm was labeled locally as the No Name Storm of 2000, though the depression went on to become Tropical Storm Leslie upon entering the Atlantic Ocean.

A hurricane, known as the "Great Miami Hurricane of 1926," caused catastrophic damage to the heavily developed Miami and Miami Beach area. Hurricane Betsy passed over Key Largo, south of the city, but did cause hurricane-force winds and very heavy rainfall there. Hurricane Andrew in 1992 also struck south of city and caused extensive damage and flooding in the Homestead area suburbs. Hurricane Wilma in 2005 caused severe damage to many high-rise buildings in the downtown area as it broke many windows out, which in turn caused bad water damage on the insides of the buildings. It also caused at least 35 direct and 26 indirect fatalities in Florida.

Miami has been identified as one of three cities in the United States most vulnerable to hurricanes, mainly due to its location and it being surrounded by ocean and low-lying coastal plains, the other two cities being New Orleans and Houston.

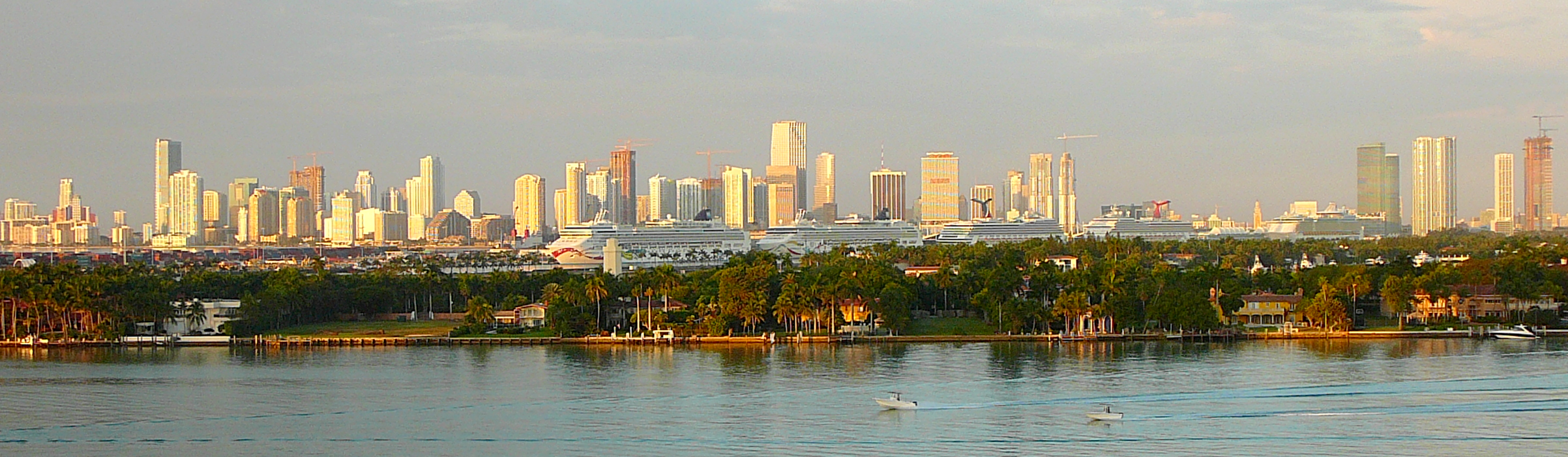
A typical winter day in Miami

== See also ==
- Climate of Florida
- Climate change in Florida
- Neotropical realm
- Tropical climate
- Tropic of Cancer
- Tropics
- Tropical sprue
