= Scout Key =

Island in the lower Florida Keys, United States

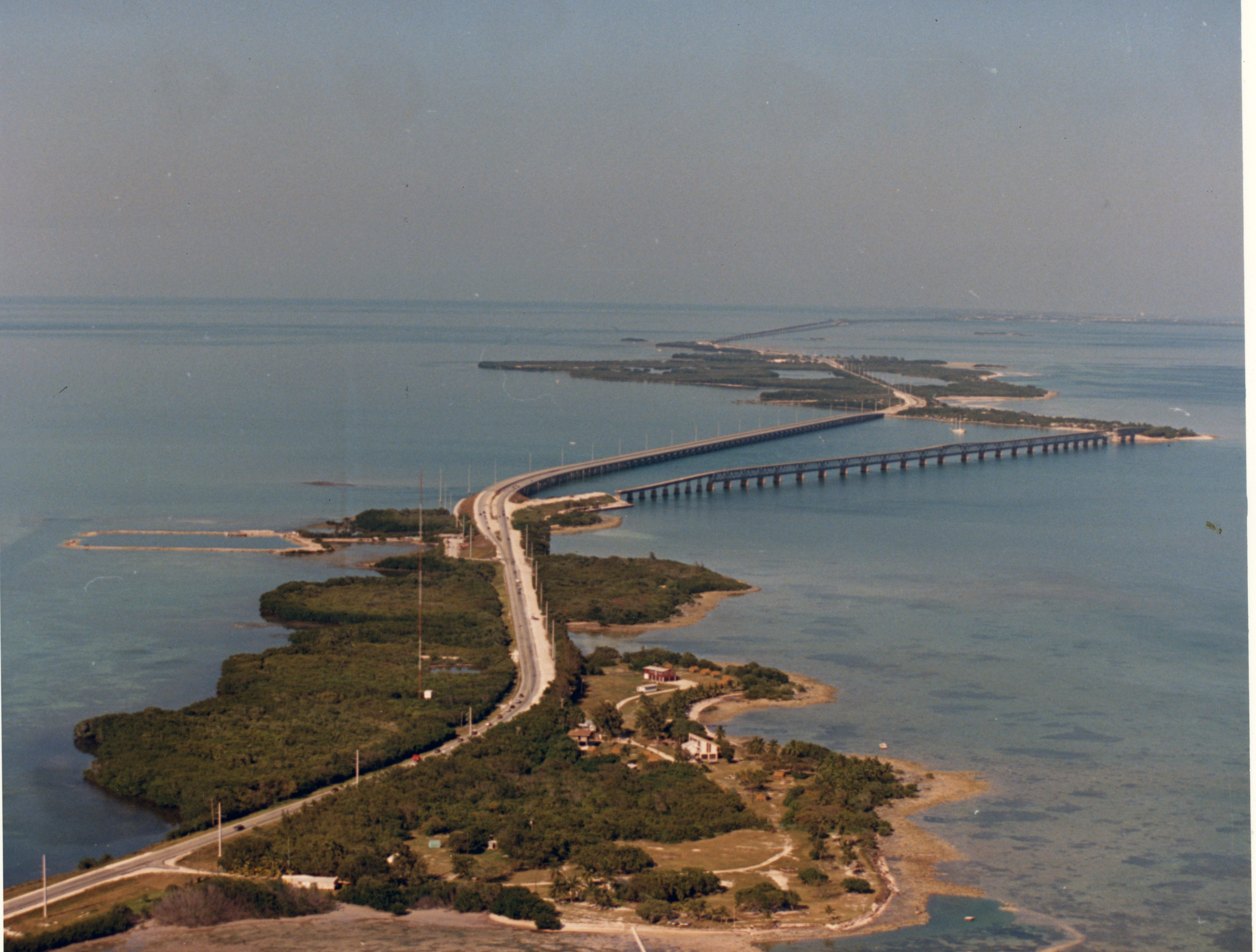
- Camp Sawyer on Scout Key in 1987

- Scout Key Scout Key (the Caribbean)

Geography
- Location: Gulf of Mexico
- Coordinates: 24.649855°N 81.310887°W
- Archipelago: Florida Keys
- Adjacent to: Florida Straits

Administration
- United States
- State: Florida
- County: Monroe

Scout Key is an island in the lower Florida Keys. It was previously known as West Summerland Key until 2010. U.S. 1 (the Overseas Highway) crosses the key at approximately mile markers 34–35, between Spanish Harbor Key and Big Pine Key.

== Etymology ==
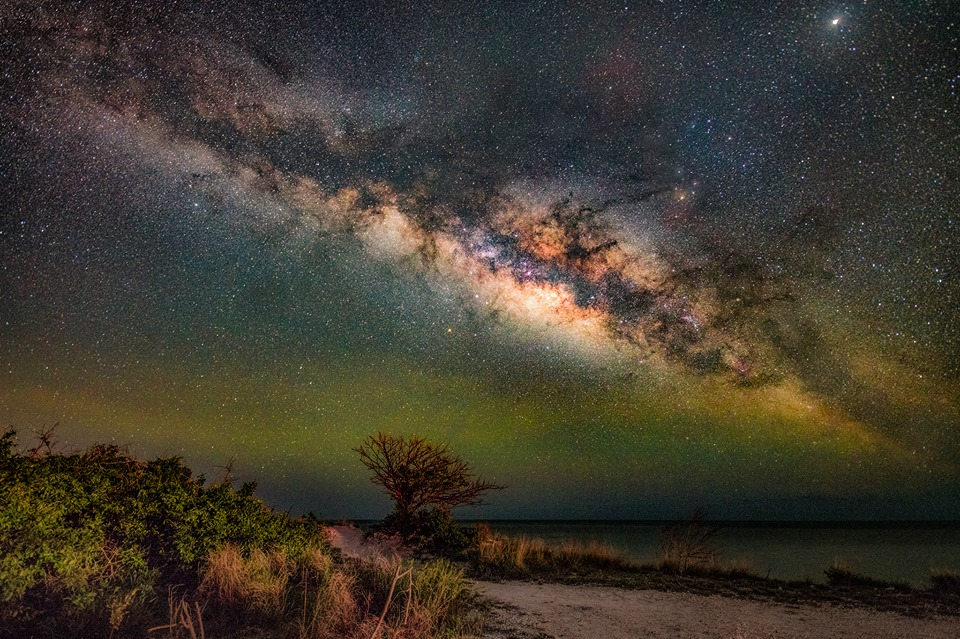
Scout Key Milky Way in April, 2018

The Key was renamed to reflect the two adjoining scout camps on it, Boy Scout Camp Sawyer and Girl Scout Camp Wesumkee. The name change also removed some confusion about its location – despite its name, the formerly-named West Summerland Key is actually about 10 miles east of Summerland Key.

== Geography ==
Originally, there were three keys at this location. They were connected by fills at the time the Overseas Railroad was built. The keys were West Summerland Key (westernmost), Middle Summerland Key (center), and no name is known for the easternmost key. West Summerland retained its name, but the other two are known simply as the Spanish Harbor Keys; named for the anchorage located between this key and Big Pine Key. Interesting features of this key include indian mounds, and storage buildings still standing from the Flagler railway construction era.

== Environment ==
In 2017, Category 4 Hurricane Irma destroyed much of the fragile mangroves and dunes on the key, reshaping the Atlantic shoreline. A few buildings were crushed and other damaged in both Scout camps. The swimming platform at the Sawyer camp had to be rebuilt yet again after the most recent rebuilds in 2004 and 2005.

== Attractions ==
Camp Wesumkee is the site of the Winter Star Party, an annual gathering of amateur astronomers.

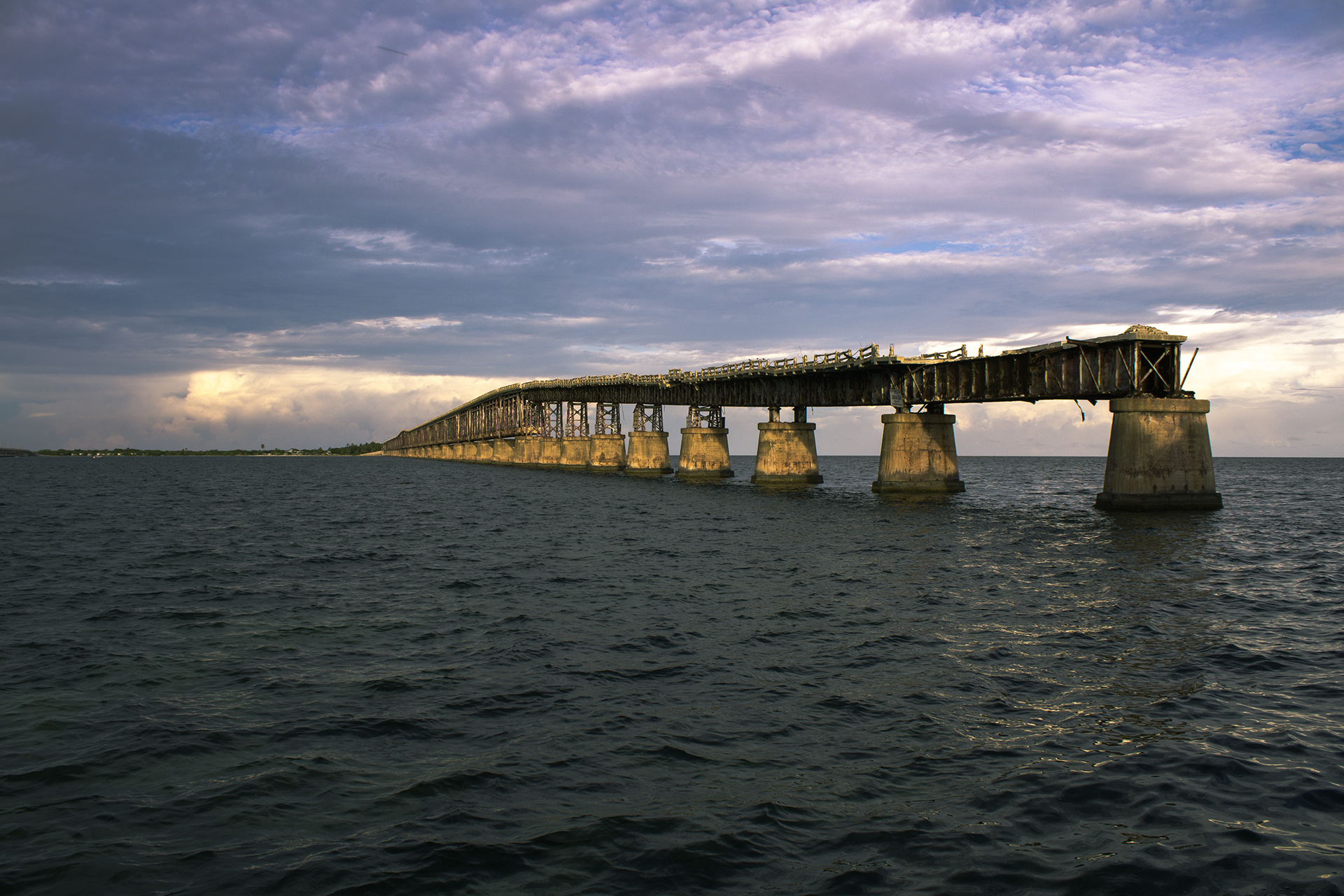
Bahia Honda Old Rail Bridge as seen from Scout Key

The eastern end of the key has a small parking area on the Atlantic that allows access to the old Bahia Honda Rail Bridge, which is a popular photography spot among tourists and locals also known as "Broken Bridge".
