= Bahia Honda Key =

Island in Florida, United States

Bahia Honda State Park
- IUCN category IV (habitat/species management area)
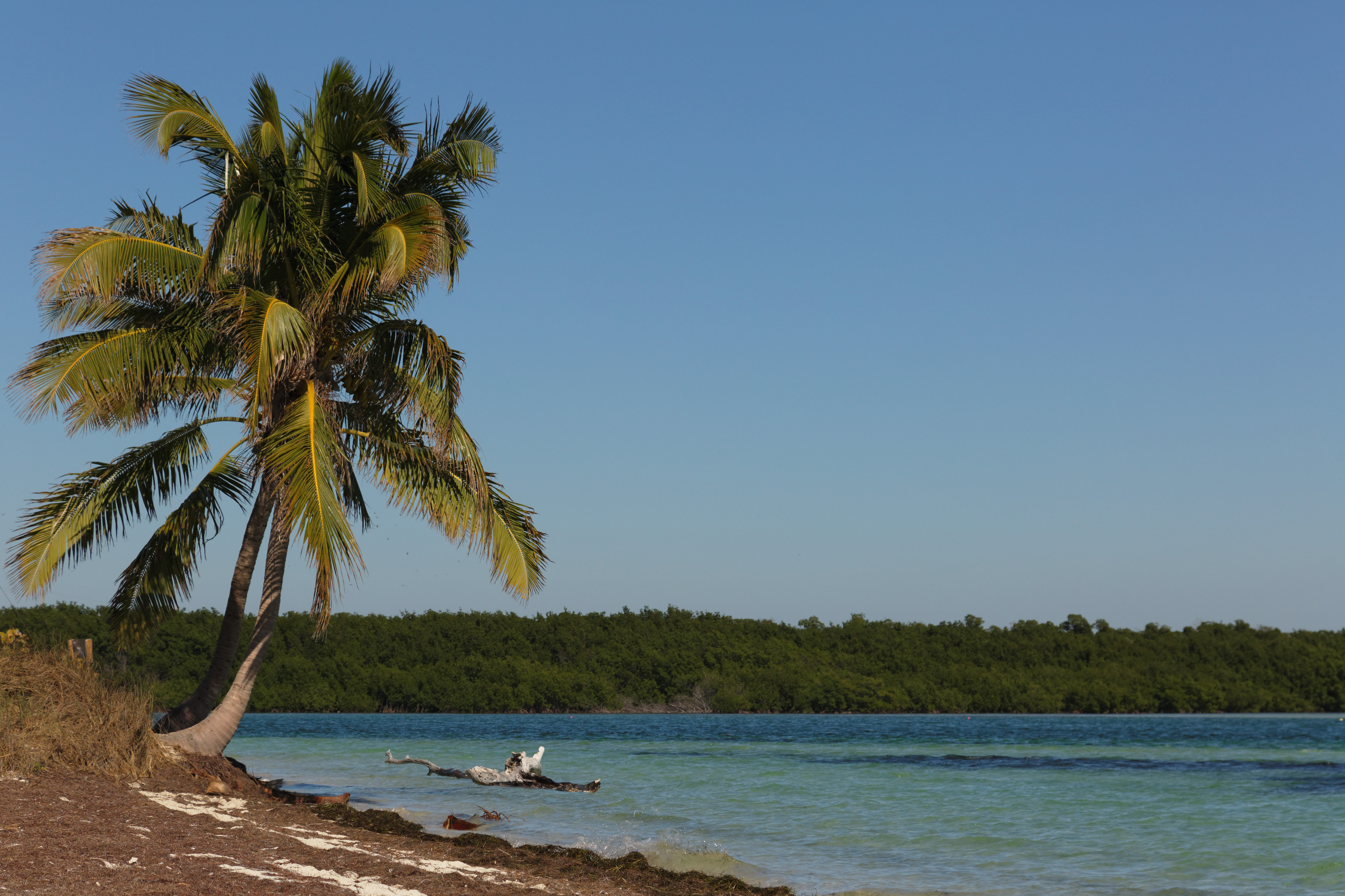
- Bahia Honda's beach in February 2013

- Location within Florida
- Location: Monroe County, Florida, United States
- Nearest city: Marathon, Florida
- Coordinates: 24.659576°N 81.261578°W
- Area: 524 acres (2.12 km^{2})
- Established: 1961
- Governing body: Florida Department of Environmental Protection

Bahia Honda (/ˈbeɪə ˈhɒndə/ BAY-ə HON-də, Spanish: [baˈia ˈonda]; lit. 'deep bay') is an island in the lower Florida Keys.

U.S. 1 (the Overseas Highway) crosses the key at approximately mile markers 36-38.5, between Ohio Key and Spanish Harbor Key 12 miles (19 km) west of Marathon, close to the west end of the Seven Mile Bridge.

The island is virtually uninhabited, being home to the 524-acre (212-hectare) Bahia Honda State Park. Founded in 1961, the park occupies most of the island. The channel at the island's west end is one of the deepest natural channels in the Florida Keys.

== Fauna ==
There are many different species of marine life in the waters surrounding the island. Just off the beach snorkelers can spot many species of small reef fish, as well as rays, barracuda, and even the occasional small nurse shark.

The only known natural colony of the now rare Miami blue butterfly was discovered in the park in 1999. The butterfly had been thought to have become extinct as a result of Hurricane Andrew in 1992.

== Flora ==
Several rare plants, including yellow satinwood (Zanthoxylum flavum), Florida silver palm (Coccothrinax argentata), Coconut palm (Cocos nucifera), Key thatch palm (Leucothrinax morrisii), and the endangered small-flowered lily-thorn (Catesbaea parviflora) are found in the park

== History ==
Henry Flagler's Florida East Coast Railway once ran through the present parkland to Key West. Built between 1905 and 1912, it was destroyed by the severe Labor Day Hurricane of 1935. Later, the railroad bridge foundations were used to build the Overseas Highway, which became U.S. 1. Part of the old Bahia Honda Bridge is accessible from the park, and offers a panoramic view of the islands. In 1908, the Florida East Coast Railway Company built two large two-story dormitories there to house workers building the Bahia Honda Bridge.

In 1890 Bahia Honda Key was the southern terminus for Miami-Dade county, then known as Dade county, which stretched as far north as present day St. Lucie River.

== Recreational activities ==
The 2.5-mile (4.0 km) natural, white sand beach was rated the #1 beach in 1992 in the United States by "Dr. Beach" Stephen Leatherman (the first Florida beach to be so honored), making it popular for swimming. A nature trail near the park's oceanside beach skirts a tidal lagoon before passing through a coastal hardwood hammock. Bicycling and inline skating can be done on the park's 3.5-mile (5.6 km) paved road, and there are several fishing and picnicking spots in the area. The Sand and Sea Nature Center(now closed due to hurricane damage) featured displays about local sea and shore life, including corals, shells, crabs, sea urchins, drift seeds, sea sponges and sea turtles. There has been now efforts to re-establish a nature center.

Kayaks and snorkeling gear can be rented at the park, and boat trips for snorkeling on the reef are available. The park has a marina with boat slips available for overnight rental. Campsites (primitive and full hook-up) and vacation cabins are available, although reservations for the winter months can be very difficult to get.

The park is also a part of the Great Florida Birding Trail.

== Hours ==
Florida state parks are open between 8 a.m. and sundown every day of the year (including holidays).

== Climate ==
Bahia Honda Key has a tropical savanna climate (Aw), similar to the rest of the Florida Keys.

Climate data for Bahia Honda Key, Florida (1991–2020 normals, extremes 2004–present)
| Month | Jan | Feb | Mar | Apr | May | Jun | Jul | Aug | Sep | Oct | Nov | Dec | Year |
|---|---|---|---|---|---|---|---|---|---|---|---|---|---|
| Record high °F (°C) | 89 (32) | 90 (32) | 93 (34) | 95 (35) | 98 (37) | 98 (37) | 100 (38) | 99 (37) | 99 (37) | 95 (35) | 94 (34) | 92 (33) | 100 (38) |
| Mean maximum °F (°C) | 82.1 (27.8) | 84.4 (29.1) | 85.9 (29.9) | 89.0 (31.7) | 90.9 (32.7) | 92.0 (33.3) | 92.9 (33.8) | 93.7 (34.3) | 91.9 (33.3) | 89.7 (32.1) | 85.1 (29.5) | 83.5 (28.6) | 94.1 (34.5) |
| Mean daily maximum °F (°C) | 74.3 (23.5) | 76.3 (24.6) | 78.4 (25.8) | 82.4 (28.0) | 85.4 (29.7) | 88.1 (31.2) | 89.9 (32.2) | 89.8 (32.1) | 87.8 (31.0) | 84.3 (29.1) | 79.1 (26.2) | 76.0 (24.4) | 82.6 (28.1) |
| Daily mean °F (°C) | 69.2 (20.7) | 70.9 (21.6) | 73.3 (22.9) | 77.1 (25.1) | 80.2 (26.8) | 82.9 (28.3) | 84.5 (29.2) | 84.3 (29.1) | 82.7 (28.2) | 79.9 (26.6) | 74.6 (23.7) | 71.3 (21.8) | 77.6 (25.3) |
| Mean daily minimum °F (°C) | 64.1 (17.8) | 65.4 (18.6) | 68.1 (20.1) | 71.7 (22.1) | 75.0 (23.9) | 77.8 (25.4) | 79.0 (26.1) | 78.8 (26.0) | 77.7 (25.4) | 75.5 (24.2) | 70.2 (21.2) | 66.6 (19.2) | 72.5 (22.5) |
| Mean minimum °F (°C) | 50.5 (10.3) | 52.5 (11.4) | 57.3 (14.1) | 64.1 (17.8) | 69.3 (20.7) | 72.4 (22.4) | 73.2 (22.9) | 73.6 (23.1) | 73.1 (22.8) | 68.8 (20.4) | 61.3 (16.3) | 57.4 (14.1) | 47.5 (8.6) |
| Record low °F (°C) | 39 (4) | 44 (7) | 51 (11) | 59 (15) | 66 (19) | 68 (20) | 71 (22) | 71 (22) | 70 (21) | 59 (15) | 54 (12) | 46 (8) | 39 (4) |
| Average precipitation inches (mm) | 1.88 (48) | 2.10 (53) | 1.68 (43) | 2.40 (61) | 3.77 (96) | 5.65 (144) | 4.77 (121) | 5.74 (146) | 7.53 (191) | 6.24 (158) | 2.23 (57) | 2.07 (53) | 46.06 (1,170) |
| Average precipitation days (≥ 0.01 in) | 5.1 | 5.1 | 4.5 | 4.8 | 5.9 | 8.3 | 10.3 | 11.5 | 13.3 | 9.9 | 5.7 | 5.9 | 90.3 |
Source: NOAA

== Gallery ==
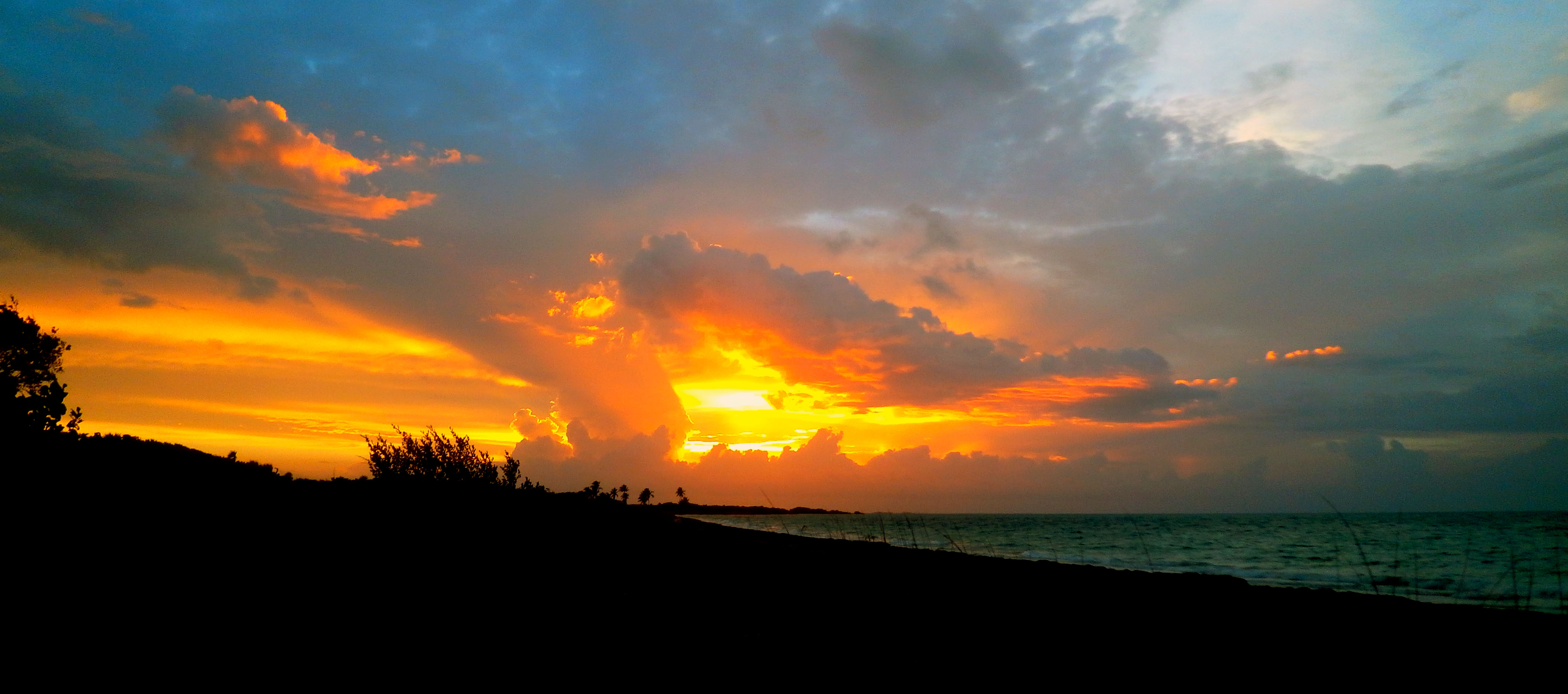
View of the sunrise

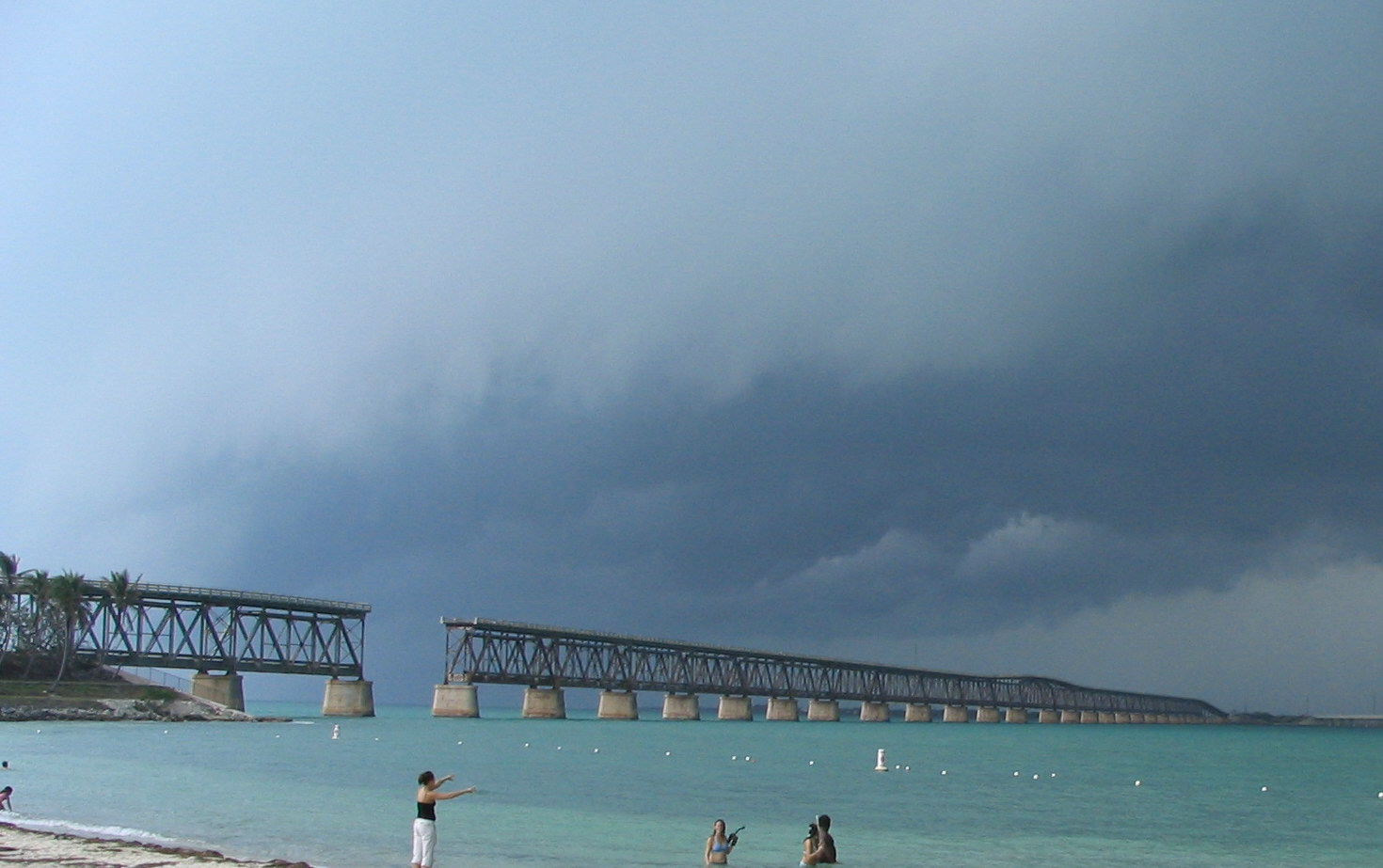
View of the Bahia Honda Rail Bridge from Bahia Honda State Park

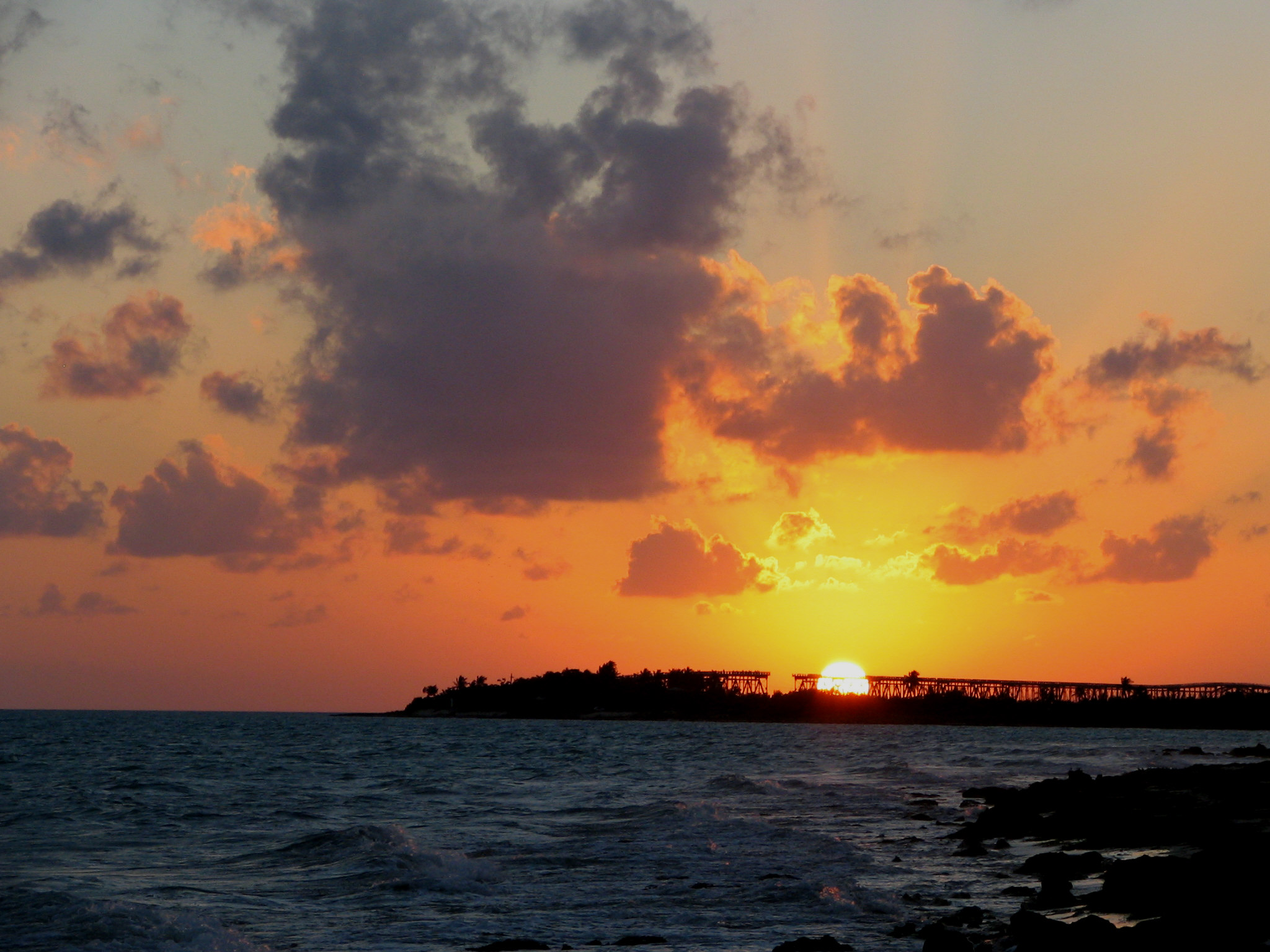
Sunset through the Old Bridge

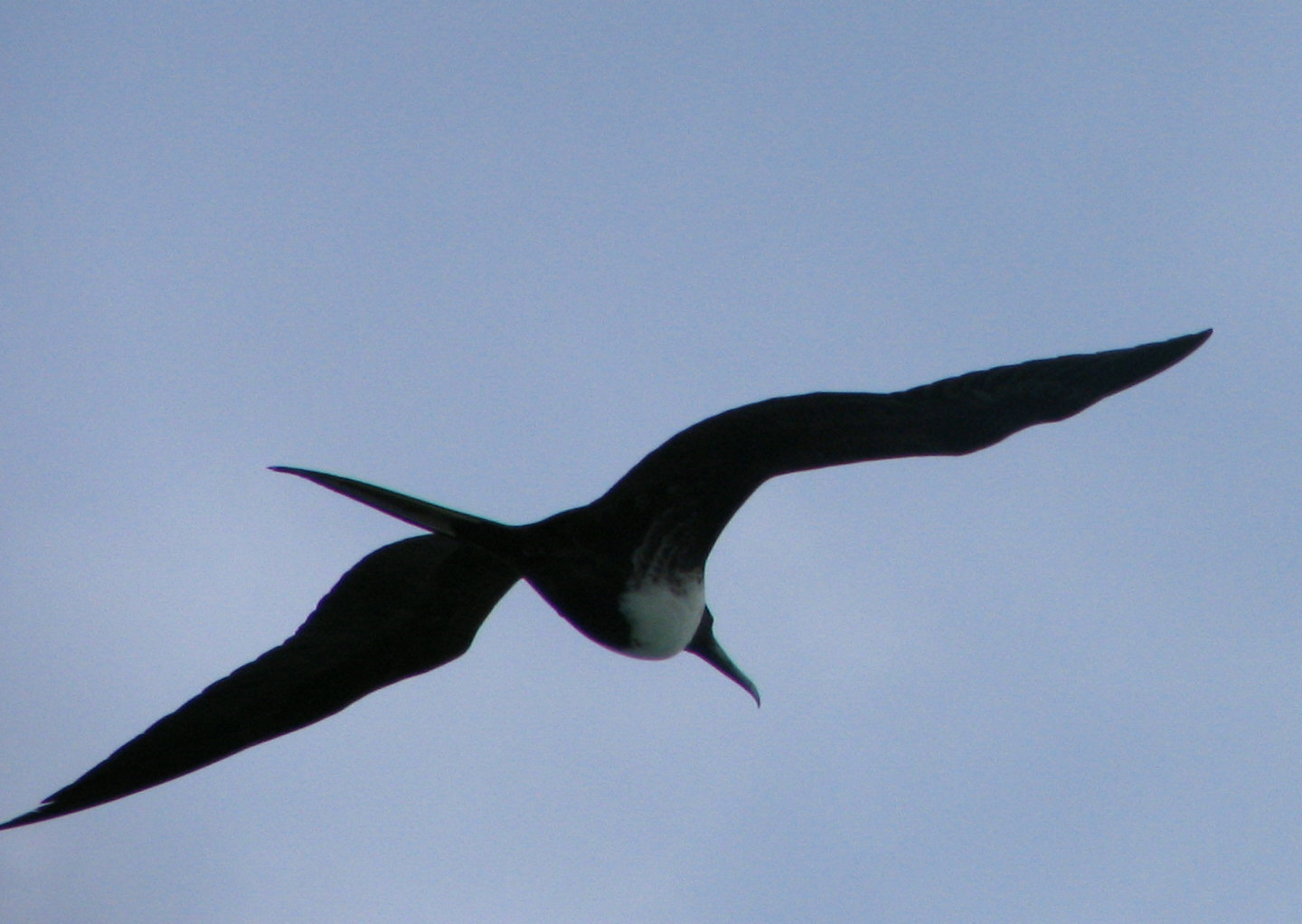
Magnificent frigatebird

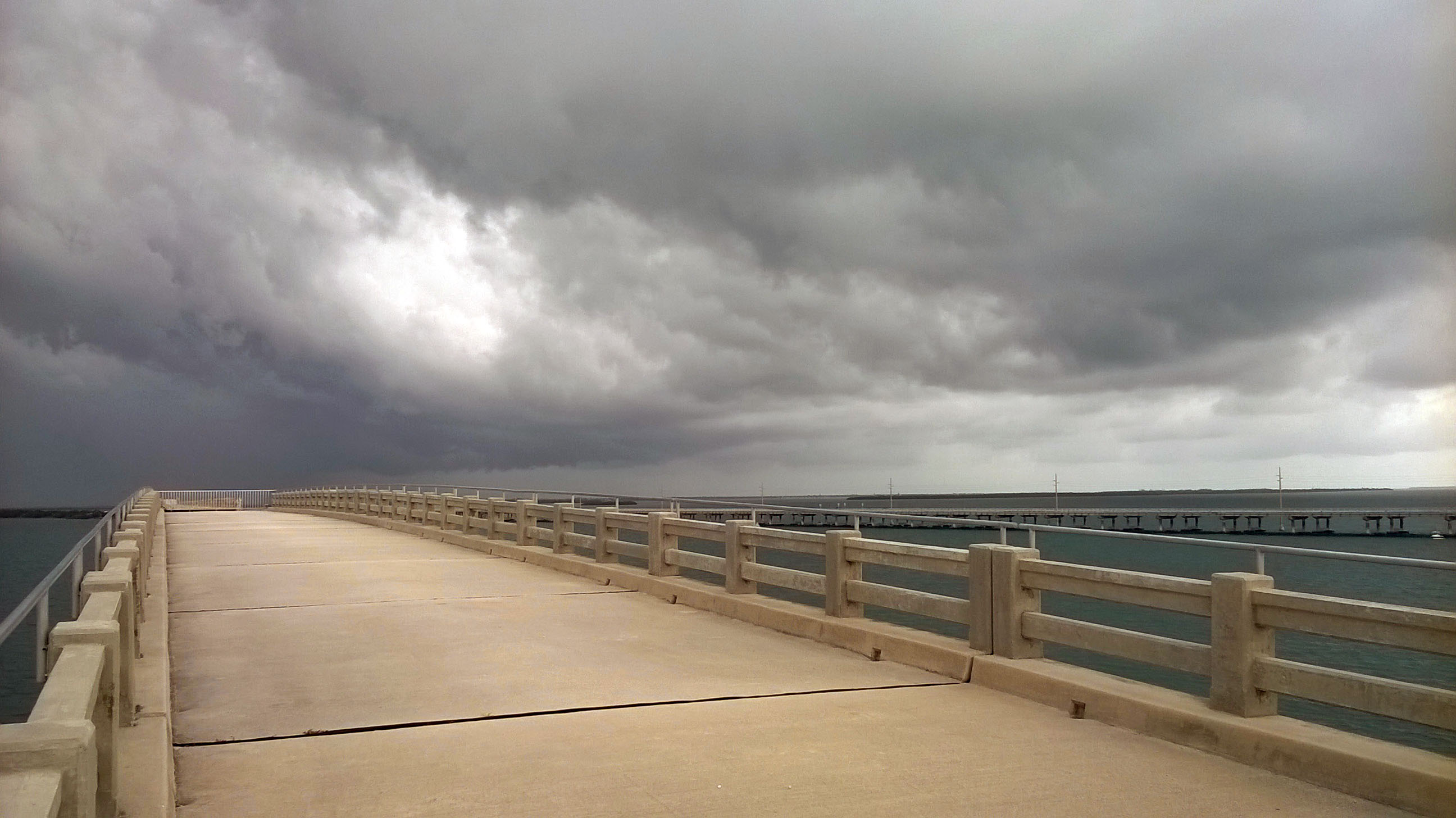
Bahia Honda State Park – Old Railroad Bridge

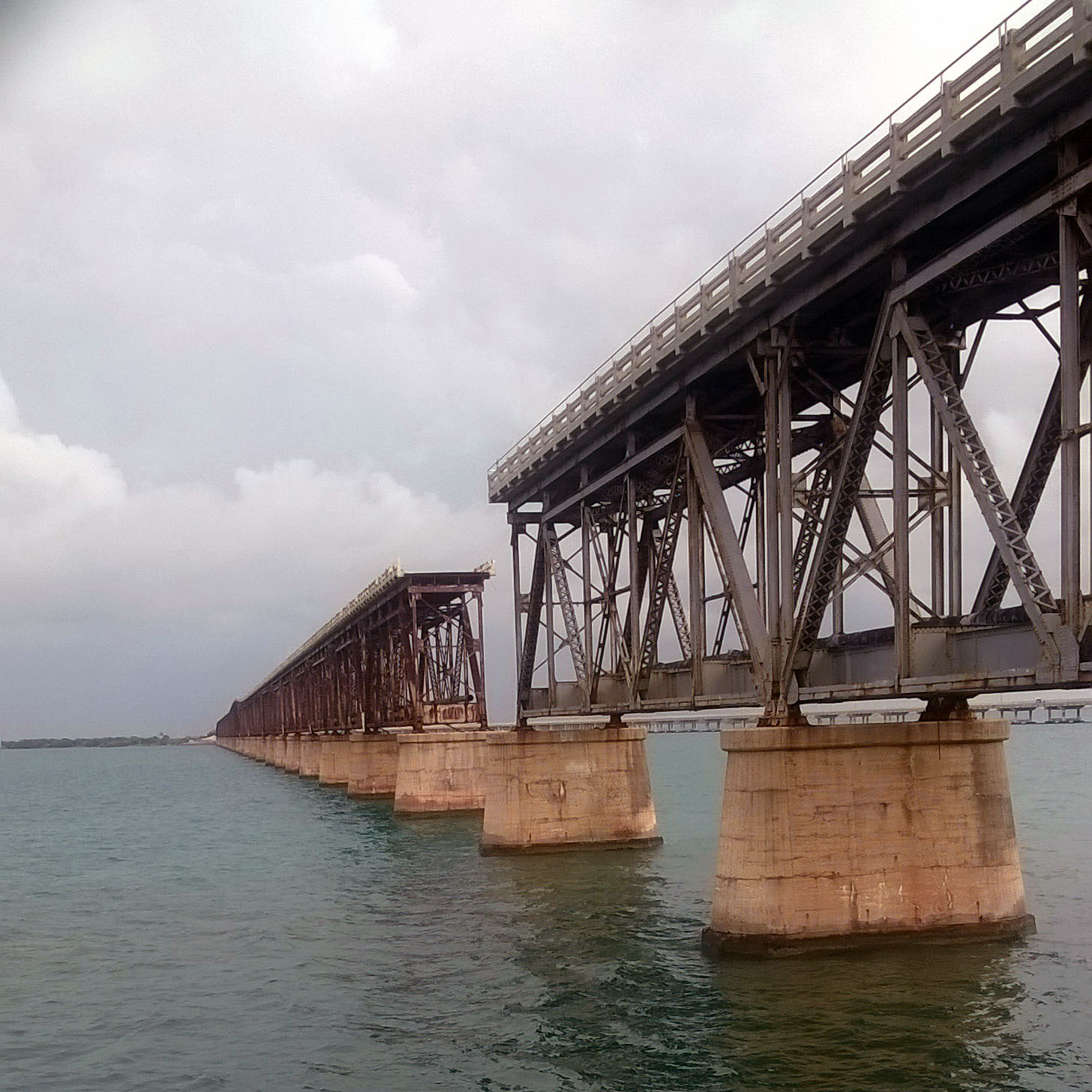
Old Railroad Bridge

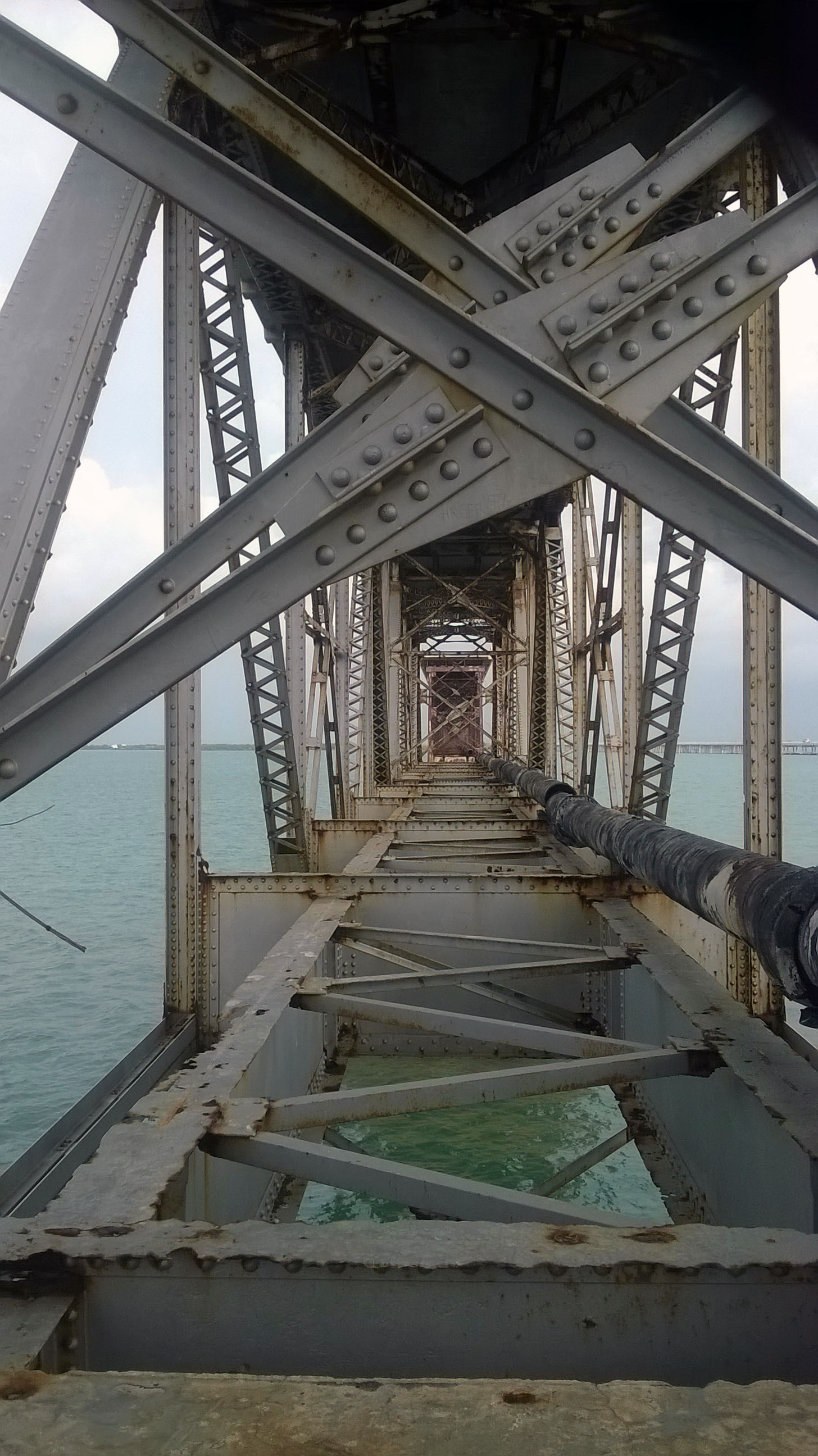
Old Railroad Bridge – view of trusses

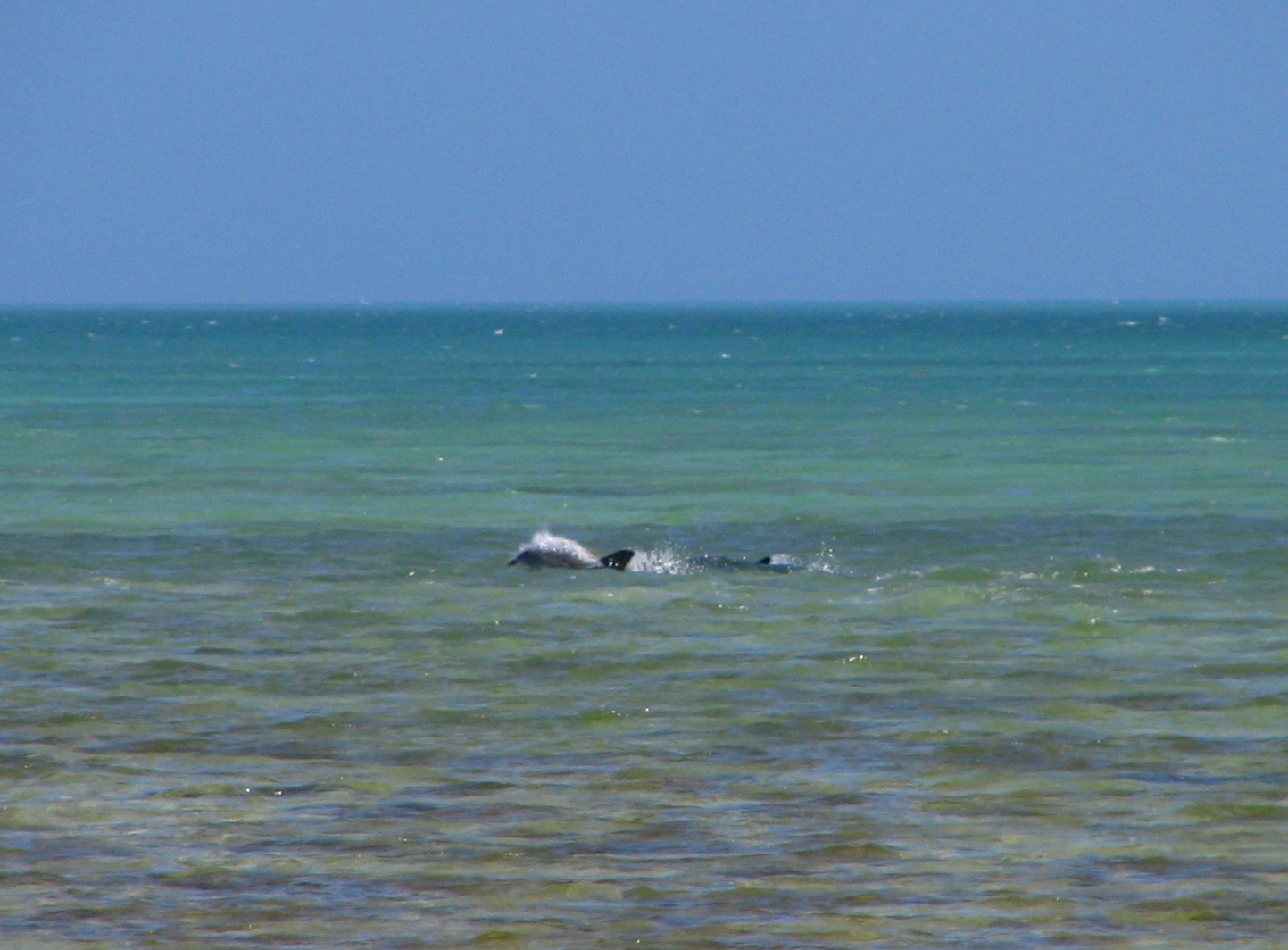
Bottlenose dolphins swimming just off the beach

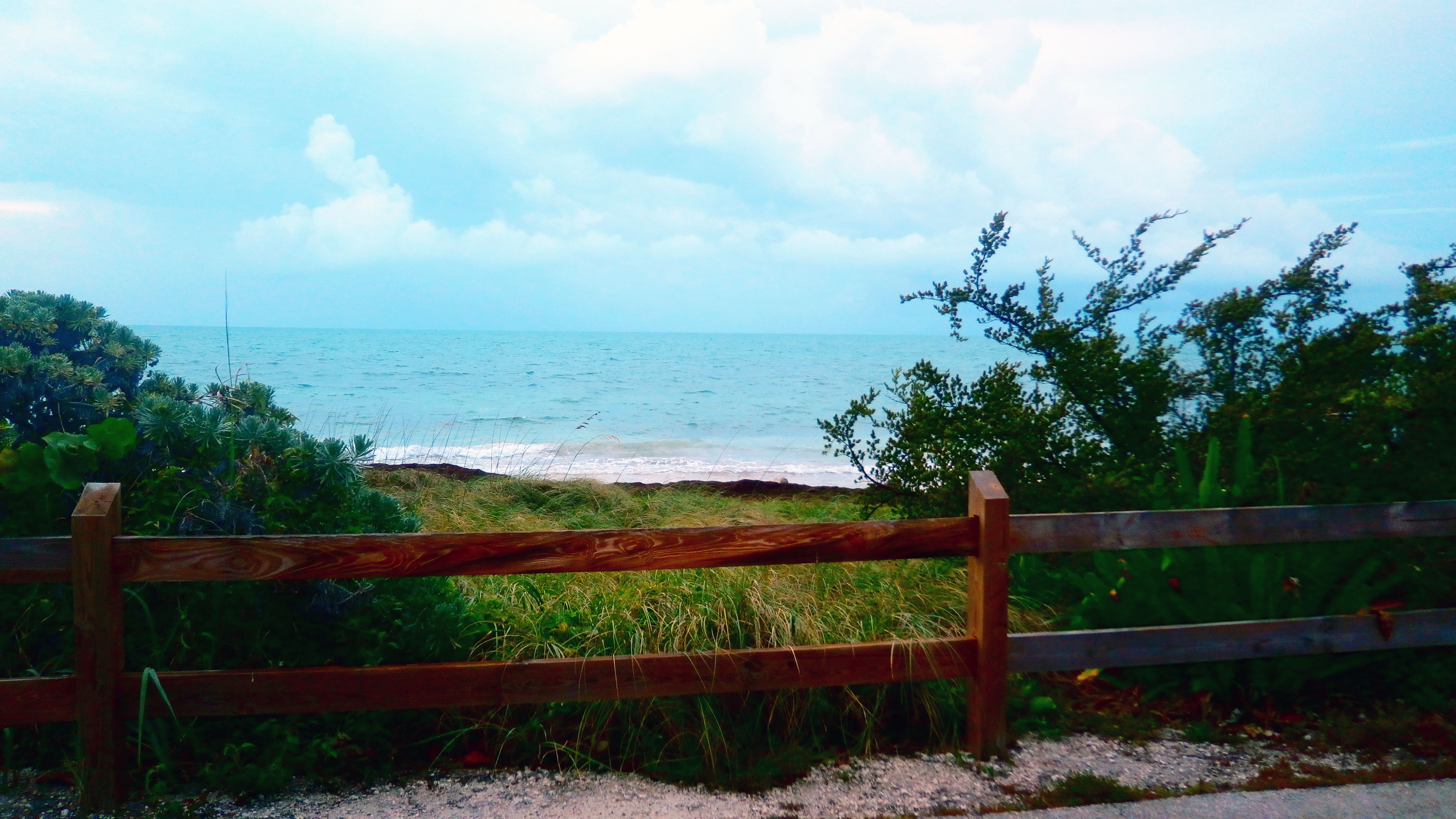
Morning view of beach

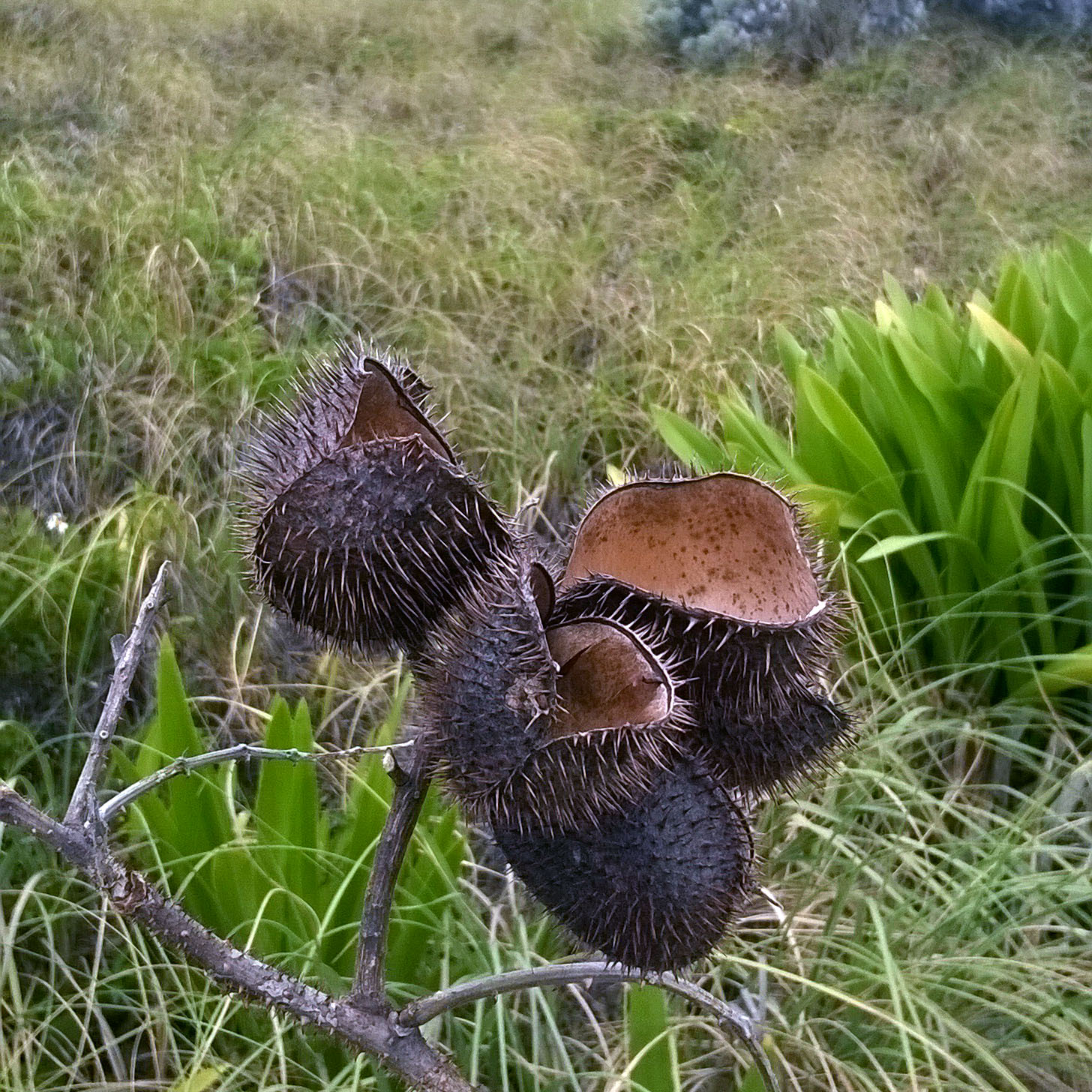
Dry seed pods

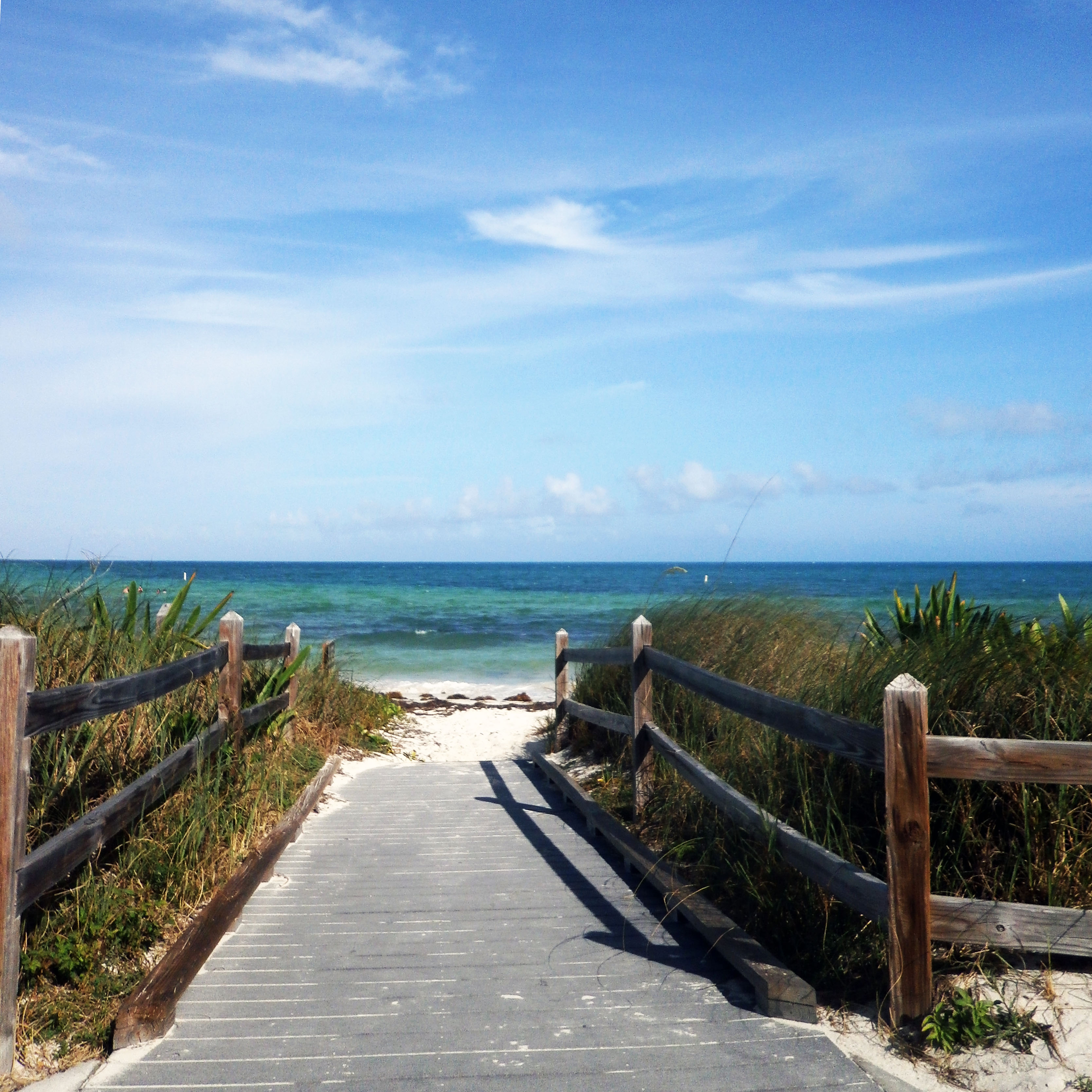
Beach access

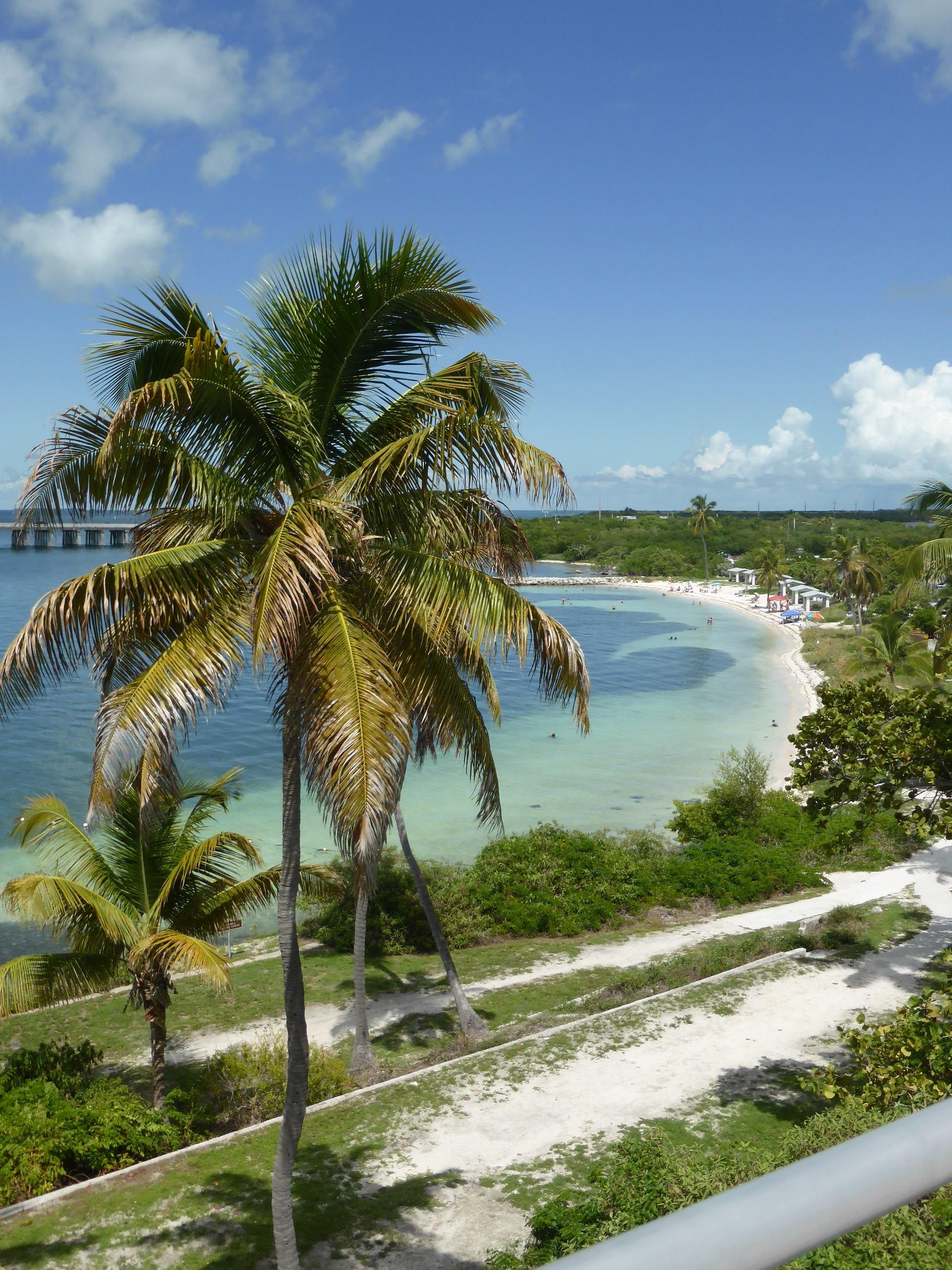
View in direction of Gulf of Mexico

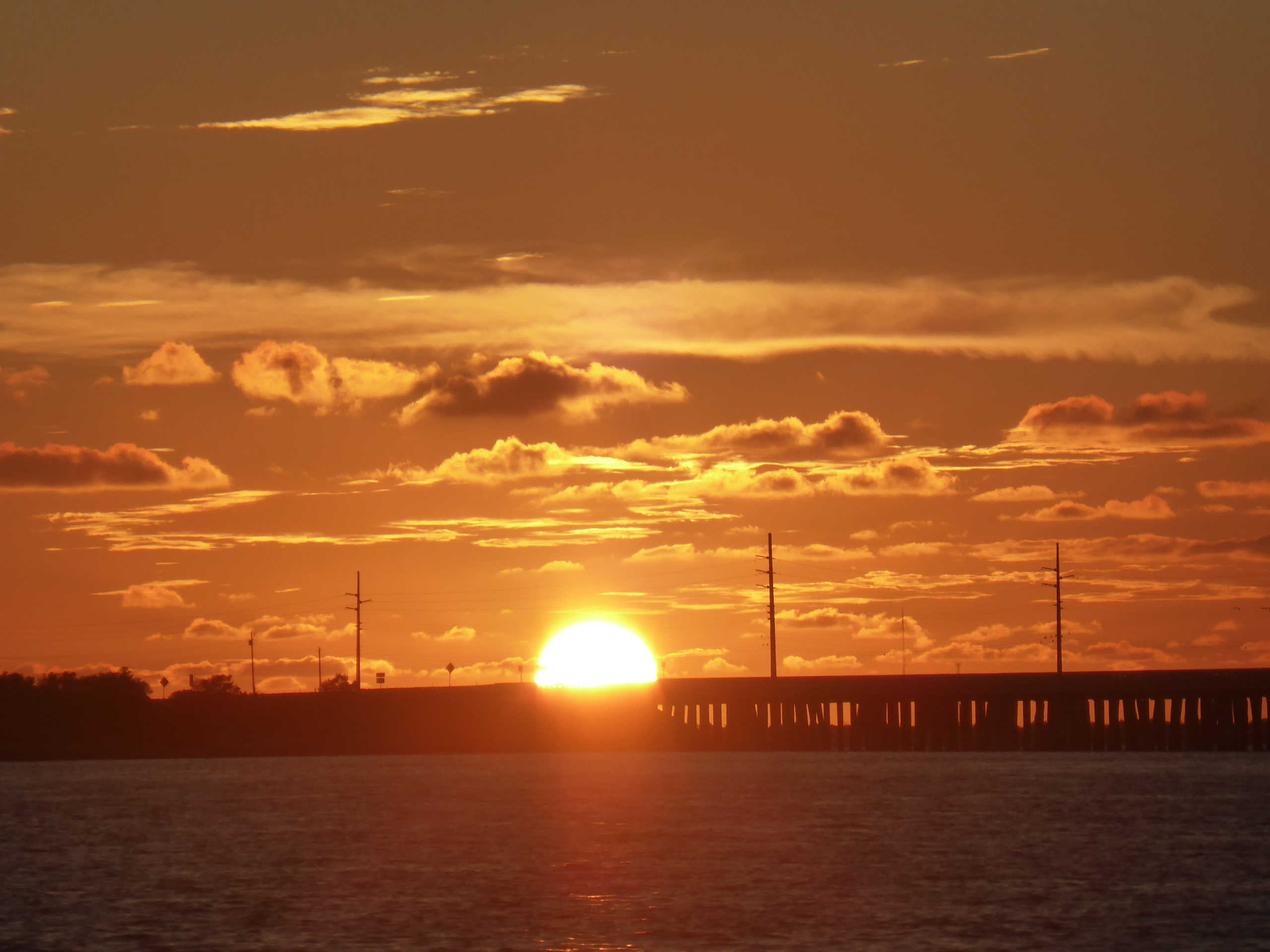
Sunset

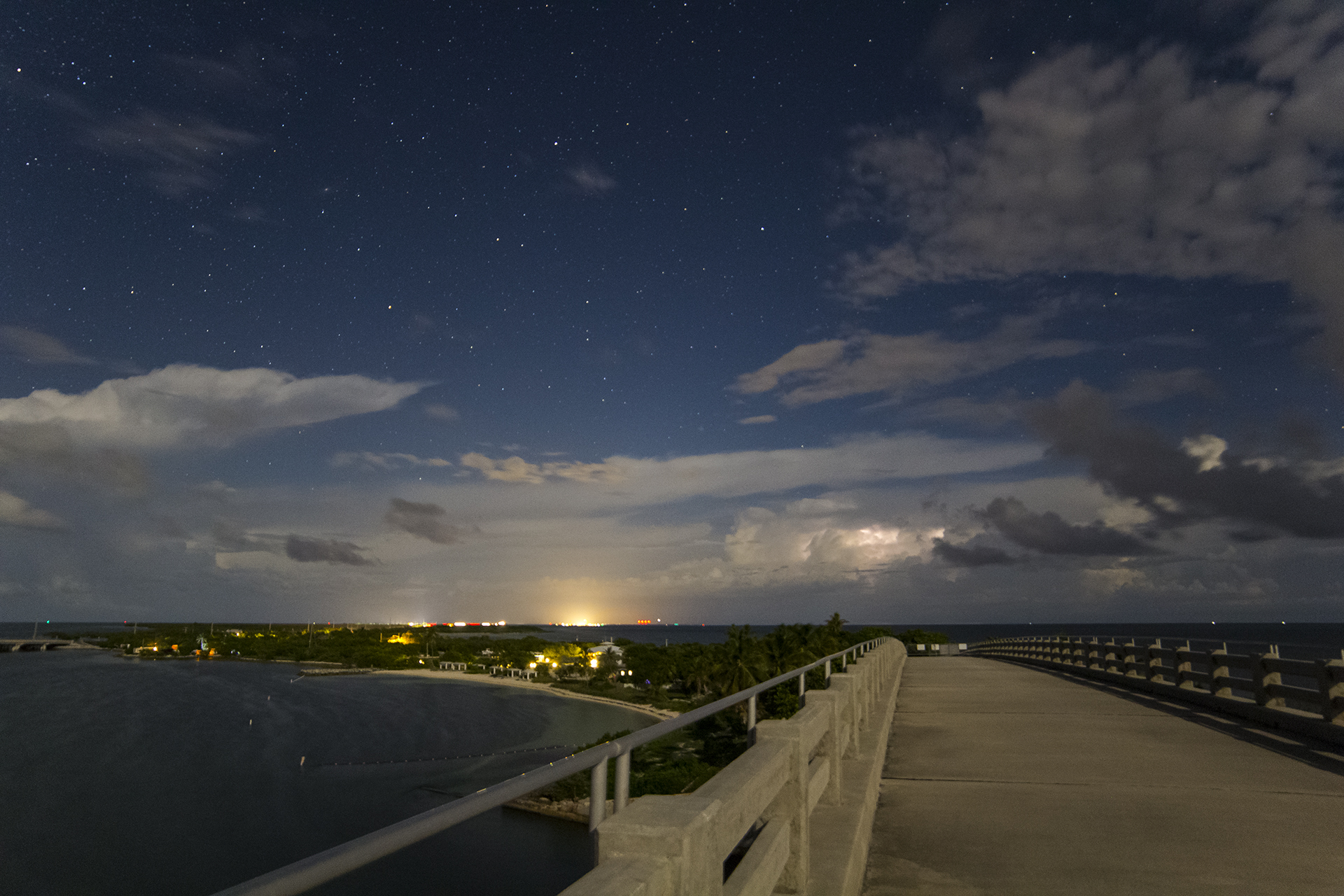
Panoramic view of the Bahia Honda Key and the park from the bridge

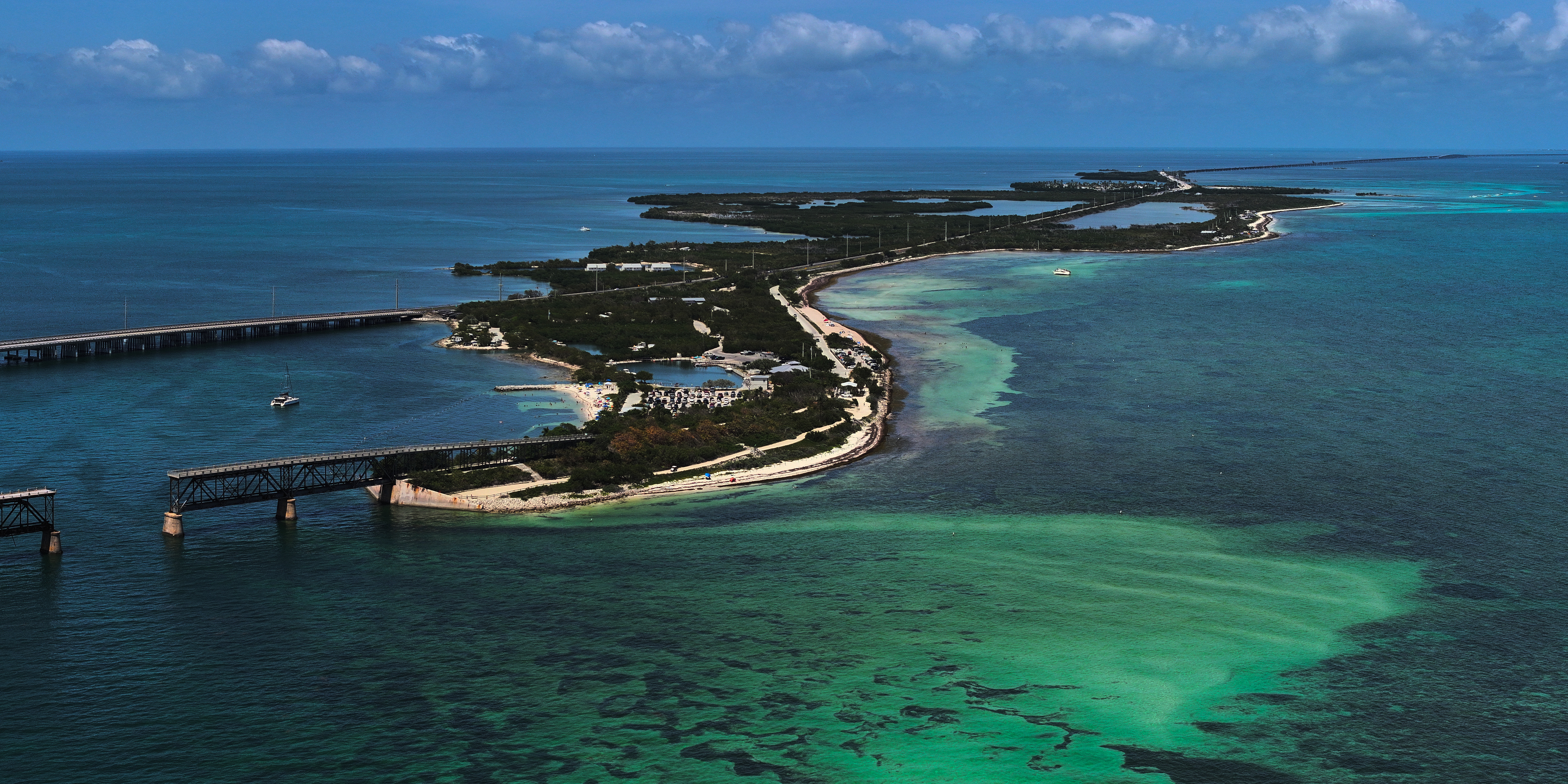
An aerial view of Bahia Honda Key from the southwest
