= Thomas L. Tatham =

Thomas Leslie Tatham
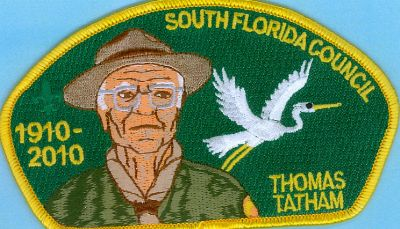
- Council shoulder patch featuring Thomas L. Tatham of the South Florida Council
- Born: October 8, 1911; Saginaw, Michigan, U.S.
- Died: September 9, 1997 (aged 85); Hendersonville, North Carolina, U.S.
- Education: University of Florida, BA; University of Miami School of Law, JD
- Occupations: Attorney, Land developer
- Known for: Scout volunteer
- Spouse: Bernice McCredie

Thomas Leslie Tatham (October 8, 1911 – September 9, 1997) was an American attorney, land developer in Dade County, and non-profit volunteer. Born in Saginaw, Michigan, Tatham attended University of Florida. Tatham was married to Bernice Tatham (née McCredie). He and Bernice had two children, Marlene Taylor and Thomas L. Tatham, Jr.; and two adopted children Curtis James Tatham and Eileen Tatham. He was an attorney and vice president of the Southeast region of the Boy Scouts of America.

== Background ==
Born in Michigan in 1911, at age 7, Tatham moved to Florida with his adoptive family. His father farmed and bought foreclosed land, setting the young Thomas on his future career path. Attending the University of Florida, he dropped out because of financial issues, eventually finishing with a degree in mechanical engineering. At the university, he became a member of Phi Kappa Tau fraternity.

He married Bernice McCredie in 1935, working in real estate while attending the University of Miami law school.

During World War II he served as a Lt. Col. in the U.S. Army in the Office of Chief Ordnance Lend-Lease Section. After the war he continued to serve in the Army reserve until 1971. After the war, Tatham, who went on to practice law and become a major landowner in Dade County. As a developer, he was instrumental in the development of Kendall Drive.

Active in Scouting most of his life, he earned the rank of Eagle Scout. He served as president and council commissioner of the South Florida Council. As a volunteer his awards included the Silver Beaver, Order of the Arrow Vigil Honor, the Distinguished Eagle Scout Award, the Silver Antelope, and the Silver Buffalo.

His only son, Thomas Jr., died in 1950. After, he and his wife adopted three more children.
