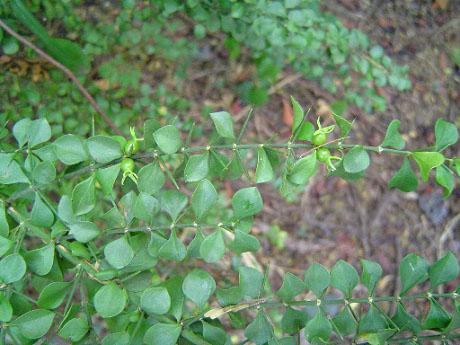

Conservation status
- Endangered (ESA)

- Critically Imperiled (NatureServe)

Scientific classification
- Kingdom: Plantae
- Clade: Tracheophytes
- Clade: Angiosperms
- Clade: Eudicots
- Clade: Asterids
- Order: Gentianales
- Family: Rubiaceae
- Genus: Catesbaea
- Species: C. melanocarpa

Binomial name
- Catesbaea melanocarpa Krug & Urb.

= Catesbaea melanocarpa =

Species of plant

Catesbaea melanocarpa is a rare species of flowering plant in the coffee family known by the common name tropical lilythorn. It is native to five Caribbean islands: Puerto Rico, St. Croix in the United States Virgin Islands, Antigua, Barbuda, and one island in Guadeloupe. The plant is threatened by habitat loss.

This is a shrub which can reach three meters in height, its spreading branches lined with spines up to two centimeters long. Between the spines are clusters of green leaves with blades up to 2.5 centimeters long by 1.5 wide. Flowers are solitary or grow in pairs from the leaf axils. The funnel-shaped white corolla of the flower is about a centimeter long. The fruit is round and black in color.

This plant was first discovered on Antigua. The original specimens were kept in an herbarium in Berlin until they were destroyed in a bombing during World War II. Today the plant is reportedly rare in Antigua and its abundance and distribution in Barbuda and Guadeloupe is not well known. There is a single remaining wild specimen in highly disturbed, privately owned land in Cabo Rojo, Puerto Rico; approximately 100 plants remain on St. Croix. Its rarity in these insular areas of the United States prompted its listing as an endangered species of that country in 1999. It has a high risk of extinction because of its low numbers and the threats that still remain. The main threats are habitat destruction during development of residential areas and tourist destinations, fires, and any single severe event that could destroy large sections of the remaining populations, such as a hurricane. For example, the plant was difficult to locate after Hurricane Hugo in 1989.

In the insular areas, the plant occurs in subtropical dry forests, which are relatively dry compared to other habitat types on the islands, receiving up to 40 inches (100 centimeters) of rain yearly.
