= South Florida Council =

Scouting organization in Florida, US

South Florida Council (#084)
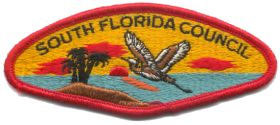
- Owner: Boy Scouts of America
- Headquarters: Davie, Florida
- Country: United States
- Founded: 1911
- Scout Executive: Jeffrey Berger, CNP, CFRE
- Website sfcbsa.org

The South Florida Council is a 501(c)(3) organization chartered by the Boy Scouts of America to serve Broward, Miami-Dade, and Monroe Counties in South Florida. As of 2022, the South Florida Council had a membership of more than 20,000 youth and adults in traditional and in-school and after-school programs.

== History ==
In 1911, the Miami Council was formed. It merged with the Dade County Council (#084) in 1921. In 1927, the Broward County Council was formed. It merged with the Dade County Council in 1933 and the Council's current geographical boundaries had been formed, consisting of Broward, Dade, and Monroe Counties. In 1945, the Dade County Council changed its name to the South Florida Council (#084).

A year after Scouting began in Miami, the tradition of an annual recognition banquet began. In May, 1912, newspaper accounts reported that Scouts were called upon at the banquet to recount the "good turns" they had performed. Their deeds ranged from the prosaic, such as picking up debris from roads and running errands, to the bygone ("holding someone's horse") and the dramatic (rescuing a person who fell into a river). Also in 1912, the auditorium of a former school building in Miami was converted into a gymnasium for Boy Scouts to use.

As 1913 drew to a close, a highlight for Miami Scouts was a visit to Villa Serena, the winter home of then-U.S. Secretary of State William Jennings Bryan. Introduced as "one of America's greatest Scouts and citizens", Bryan spoke to the youths from his front porch as they stood at attention and rendered the Scout Salute.

As early as the 1920s, there were more than 300 Scouts in Key West, the southernmost point of the United States. In 1938, a gala council-wide gathering was held in Key West, headlined on page one of the Key West Citizen as an "impressive Scout campfire rally". Key West mayor William Albury addressed the assemblage, preceded by a parade.

A highlight for the South Florida Council in later years was the youth encampment held on Lammas Island in 1976 as part of the United States Bicentennial celebration that year. A joint effort with the city of Miami and the U.S. Coast Guard 7th District, it was called the 1976 Bicentennial Project for the Youth of Miami. Upon completion of a permanent dock on the island, it was dubbed "Miami Scouting World" and marked with a bronze plaque.

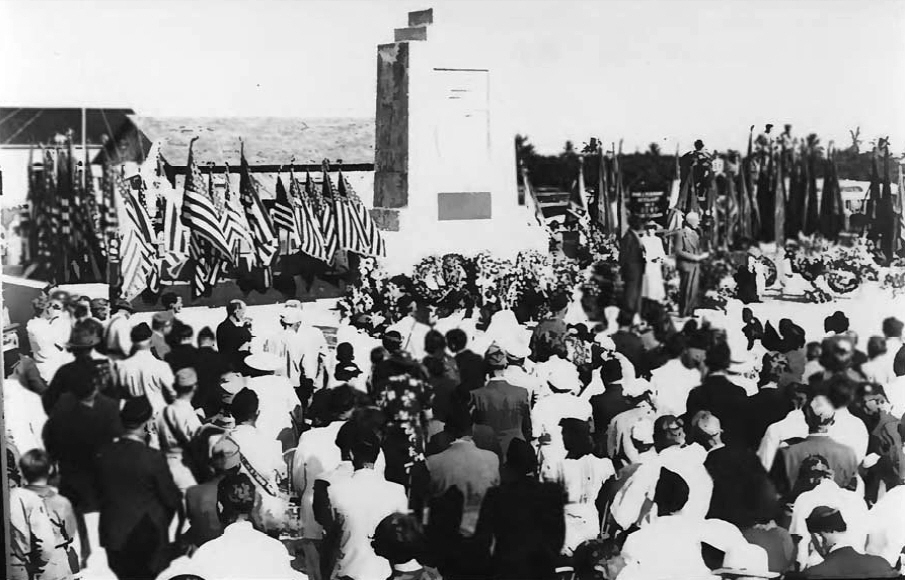
Islamorada Memorial dedication, 1937

Hurricanes have been a significant part of the Council's history. In the aftermath of the catastrophic 1935 Labor Day hurricane which devastated the Florida Keys and killed hundreds, Boy Scouts from the Dade County Council, as it was then known, were part of the clean-up efforts and participated in the ceremonies dedicating the Islamorada Memorial in November, 1937.

When Hurricane Andrew struck the Homestead area in 1992, the Council organized Scout troops outside the ravaged area to help distribute emergency food and clothing. The Council's own archived records were lost in 2005 when Hurricane Wilma tore the roof off of a storage building and inundated the vicinity with flood waters. Severe damage was also sustained by Camp Seminole, the Council's principal reservation, resulting in its closure for seven years until it was eventually rebuilt and re-opened in 2012 as Camp Elmore (below). More recently, Hurricane Irma in 2017 damaged the Council's camp on Scout Key.

== Organization ==
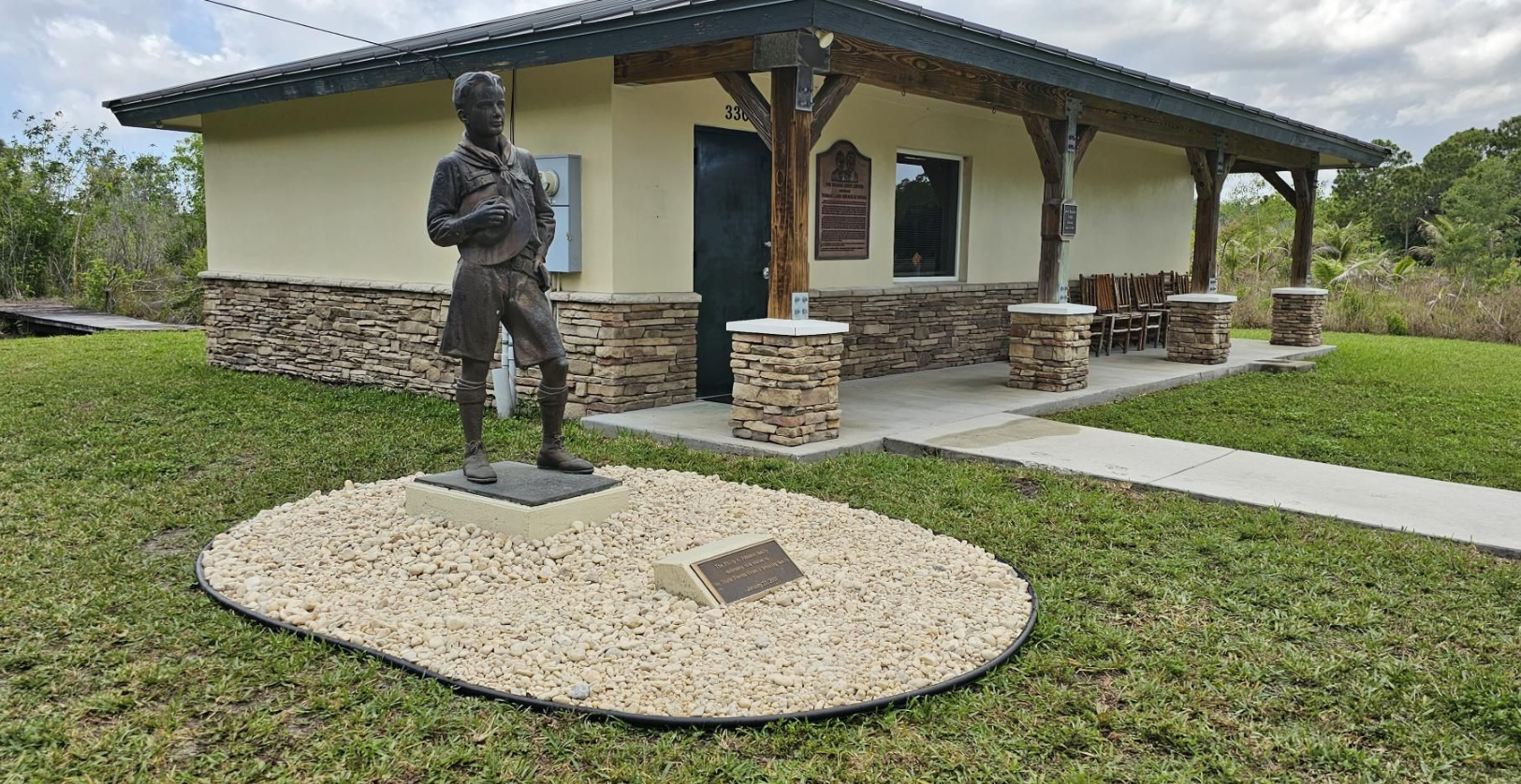
South Florida Council, Scouting America Headquarters in Davie, Florida.

Until March 2023, the council's headquarters were located in Miami Lakes and named after a former council president, Thomas L. Tatham. He was a prominent attorney and land developer in Florida who was active in Scouting, both as a youth and Council leader. In 1995, Tatham donated $2.5 million to the Council. As of 2017, almost 90% of the non-profit's revenues were allocated to its programs and Charity Navigator gave it a 100 percent rating that year for "accountability and transparency". In March 2023, the headquarters moved to Davie, Florida at the council's Camp Elmore property.

The council is divided into five districts:

- Sawgrass District serves Northern Broward County (North of I-595).
- Panther District serves Southern Broward County (South of I-595).
- Phoenix District serves Northern Miami-Dade County (North of SW 24th Street / Coral Way)
- Everglades District serves Southern Miami-Dade County (South of SW 24th Street / Coral Way)
- Buccaneer District serves Monroe County.

== Programs ==
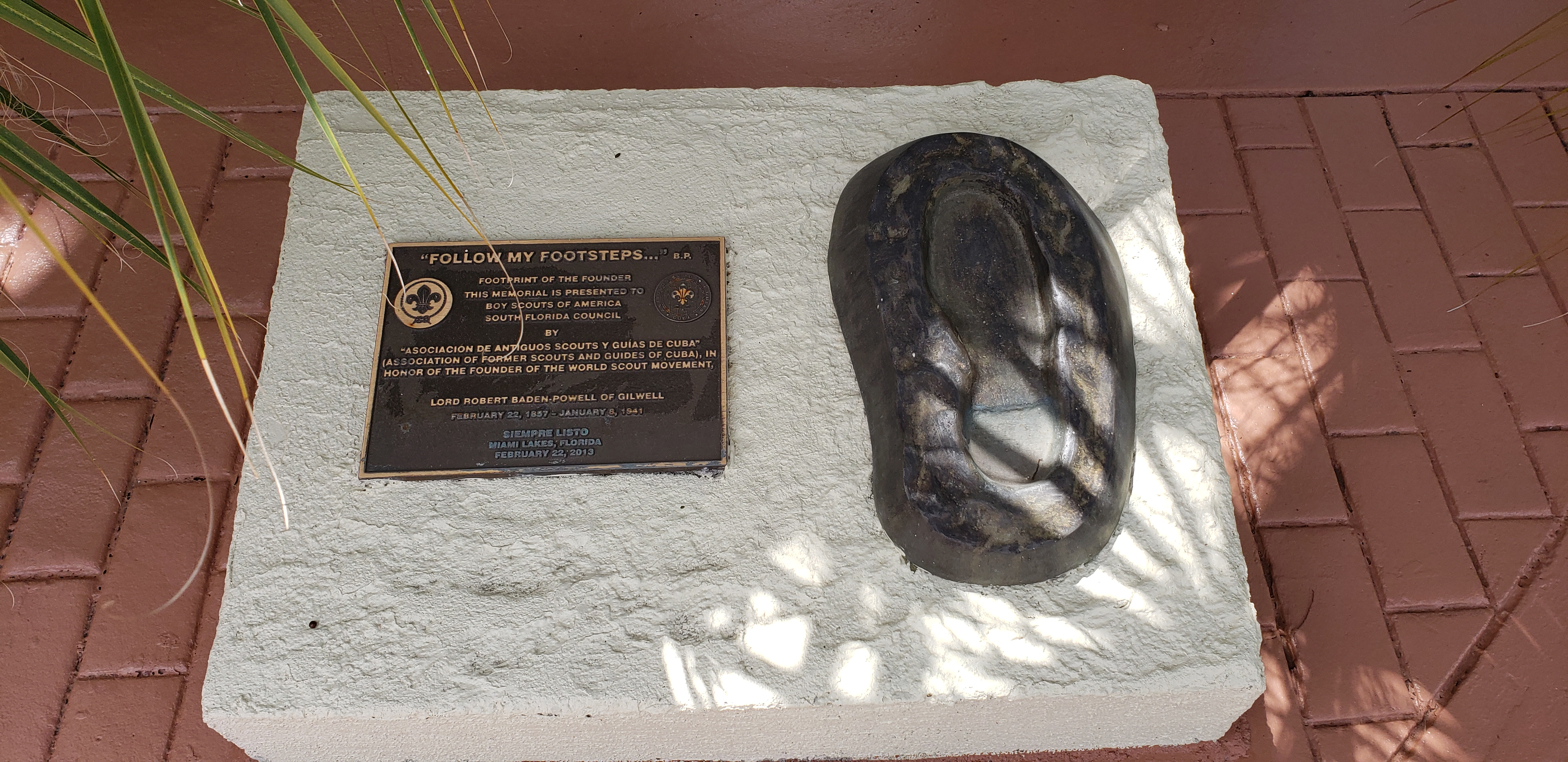
B-P's footprint outside the council office

The South Florida Council provides over 100,000 hours of community service through service projects, with the majority of hours coming from Eagle Scout Leadership Service Projects. Other activities for the public include Memorial Day ceremonies and a parade, organized in conjunction with the City of Davie at the Bergeron Rodeo Grounds.

=== Camps ===
The South Florida Council owns and operates three camps serving thousands of youth annually:

Camp Elmore

Located in Davie, Florida, the Council received the 117-acre (47 ha) land parcel as a gift from the Board of County Commissioners of Broward County in 1958 and developed it as Camp Seminole. It was devastated by Hurricane Wilma on October 24, 2005, which caused extensive damage to 80% of the buildings and infrastructure. In the wake of the tropical cyclone's destruction, the camp was closed for the next seven years.

A master plan was formulated for extensive re-development, resulting in multiple new shelters, elevated campsites, and a lake with swimming and boating, along with upgrades to utilities and other recreational facilities. By the time the camp re-opened in 2012, the reconstruction cost $10 million, much of which was underwritten by various philanthropists and corporate donors. Road paving contractor Robert Elmore donated $1 million towards the rebuilding and the camp was renamed in his honor. A similar donation for clearing and in-kind engineering work was provided by Downrite Engineering, which also rebuilt the camp's lake to a depth of 12 feet (3.7 m), making the water body "now swimmable, which it wasn't before", the Council Executive said to a reporter. In recognition of the Miami-based engineering firm's contributions, the Council now titles the facility "Camp Elmore at Downrite Engineering Scout Reservation". Other area corporate contributions towards the re-building of the Council's principal camp included the Huizenga Family Foundation's funding of the chapel and Publix Supermarkets' donation for construction of the amphitheater.

Ten campsites are available at the property. Nine are named for the Council's Order of the Arrow O-Shot-Caw Lodge chapters: Elgixin, Gokhos, Paldani, Pooca Tooka, O-Shot-Co-Chee, Tomoka, Hnu-Ra-Con, To Hopki Lagi, and Nok Su. One of the campsites within Camp Elmore is named Camp Seminole, in remembrance of the past, when many South Florida Scouts and Scouters spent their time at Camp Seminole.

Camp Everglades

Camp Everglades is primarily pine rockland forest with eight primitive campsites, a main campfire arena, a main covered shelter, and pitcher pump wells.

The 253-acre (102 ha) campground is located within the Everglades National Park. The pine forest is fire dependent, and the flora and fauna have adapted to the frequent fires ignited by summer lightning storms.

Camp Sawyer

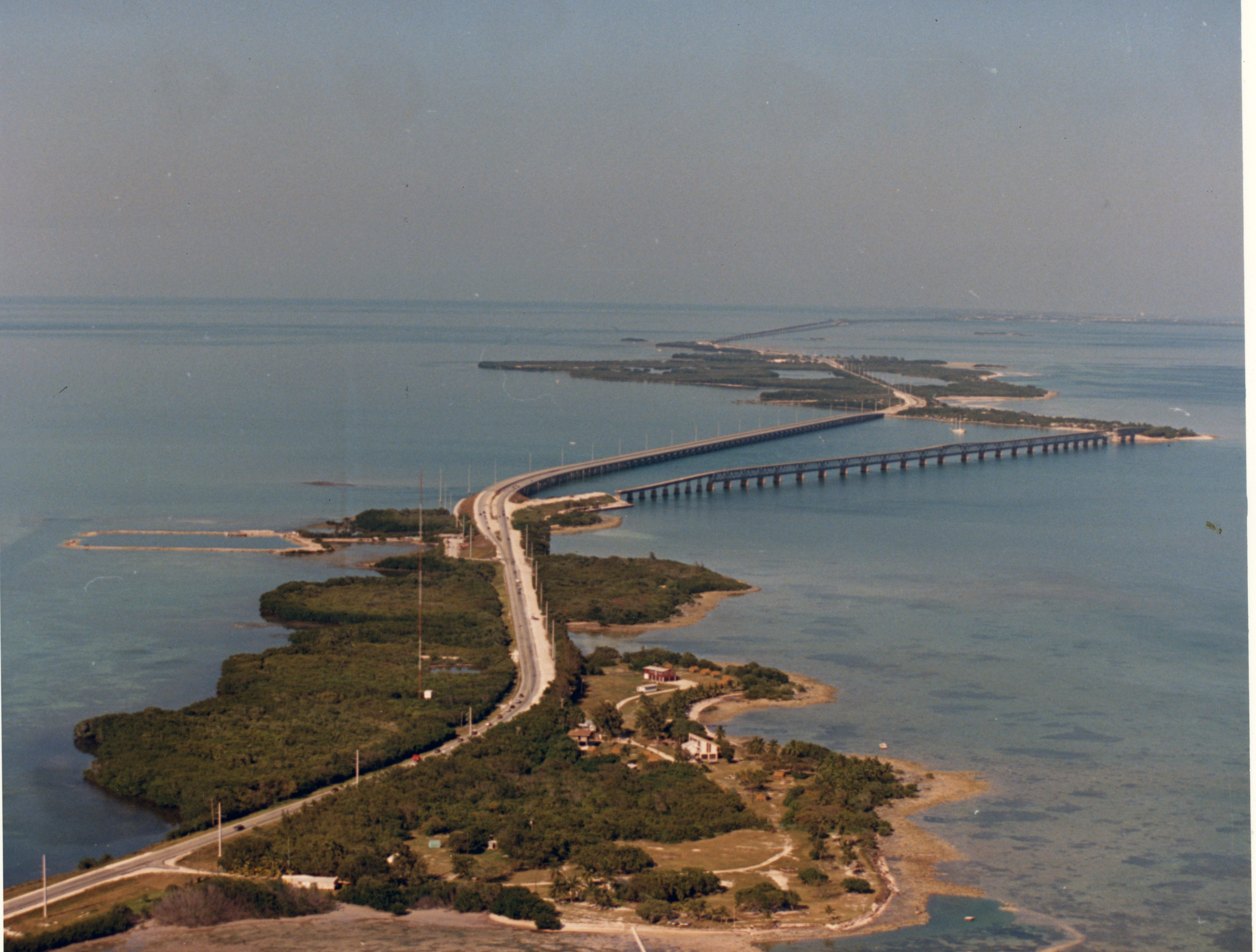
Camp Sawyer on Scout Key in 1987

A 10-acre (4.0 ha) site located on Scout Key in the lower Florida Keys, with the Atlantic Ocean on the east shore and the Gulf of Mexico directly to the west, Camp Sawyer shares the island with Camp Wesumkee of the Girl Scouts. The Camp is now part of the larger Edward B. Knight Scout Reservation, named for a philanthropist and Rotarian by that name.

Activities include: swimming, snorkeling, fishing and boating. There are four tropical campsites right on the Atlantic Ocean.

The camp was heavily damaged in September, 2017, by the 140-mph winds and storm surge from Hurricane Irma.

=== Former camps ===
The South Florida Council also formerly owned and operated the old McGregor Smith Scout Reservation in Inverness, Florida. The vast 5,484-acre (2,219 ha) tract on the Withlacoochee River was purchased for $1 million in 1969 with the intention that it would be utilized as a Scout camp by Councils throughout Florida. The envisaged statewide usage never developed, however, and its almost 300-mile (480 km) distance from Miami discouraged large numbers of troops from attending. Facing deficits and minimal attendance, the Council sold the property to the Southwest Florida Water Management District in 2005 for $13.5 million. Thankfully these proceeds and the timing allowed for the rebuilding of Camp Seminole and Camp Sawyer as Hurricane Katrina and Huirricane Wilma both impacted the council's camps the same year as the sale of McGregor Smith Scout Reservation.

=== Order of the Arrow ===
O-Shot-Caw Lodge
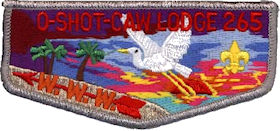
- O-Shot-Caw lodge flap featuring its totem, the great white heron
- Owner: South Florida Council
- Founded: 1955
- Staff Advisor: Cliff Freiwald
- Website o-shot-caw.org

O-Shot-Caw Lodge #265 is the South Florida Council's Order of the Arrow lodge, one of eight in Section S-4 covering the state of Florida (except the Panhandle).

On June 20, 1944, the Council's first Order of the Arrow Lodge was started as Ala-paw-tah 265 but was subsequently discontinued on September 8, 1949. On June 28, 1955, the council's current Order of the Arrow lodge, O-Shot-Caw 265, was chartered, using the great white heron as its "totem". Within a year, the lodge had grown to more than 125 members. In the years since, the lodge has hosted numerous statewide conferences and seminars for Section S-4 at Camp Seminole (now Camp Elmore).

The lodge is organized into nine Chapters, corresponding to the Council's Districts:

- Sawgrass District - Elgixin Chapter
- Panther District - Kuwa Chobee Chapter
- Phoenix District - Totika Fuswa Chapter
- Everglades District - Pah-Ha-Yo-Kee Chapter
- Buccaneer District - Nok Su Chapter

== See also ==
- Scouting in Florida
- Gulf Stream Council (North)
- Southwest Florida Council (Northwest)
