= Bahia Honda Rail Bridge =

Abandoned bridge in the Florida Keys, US

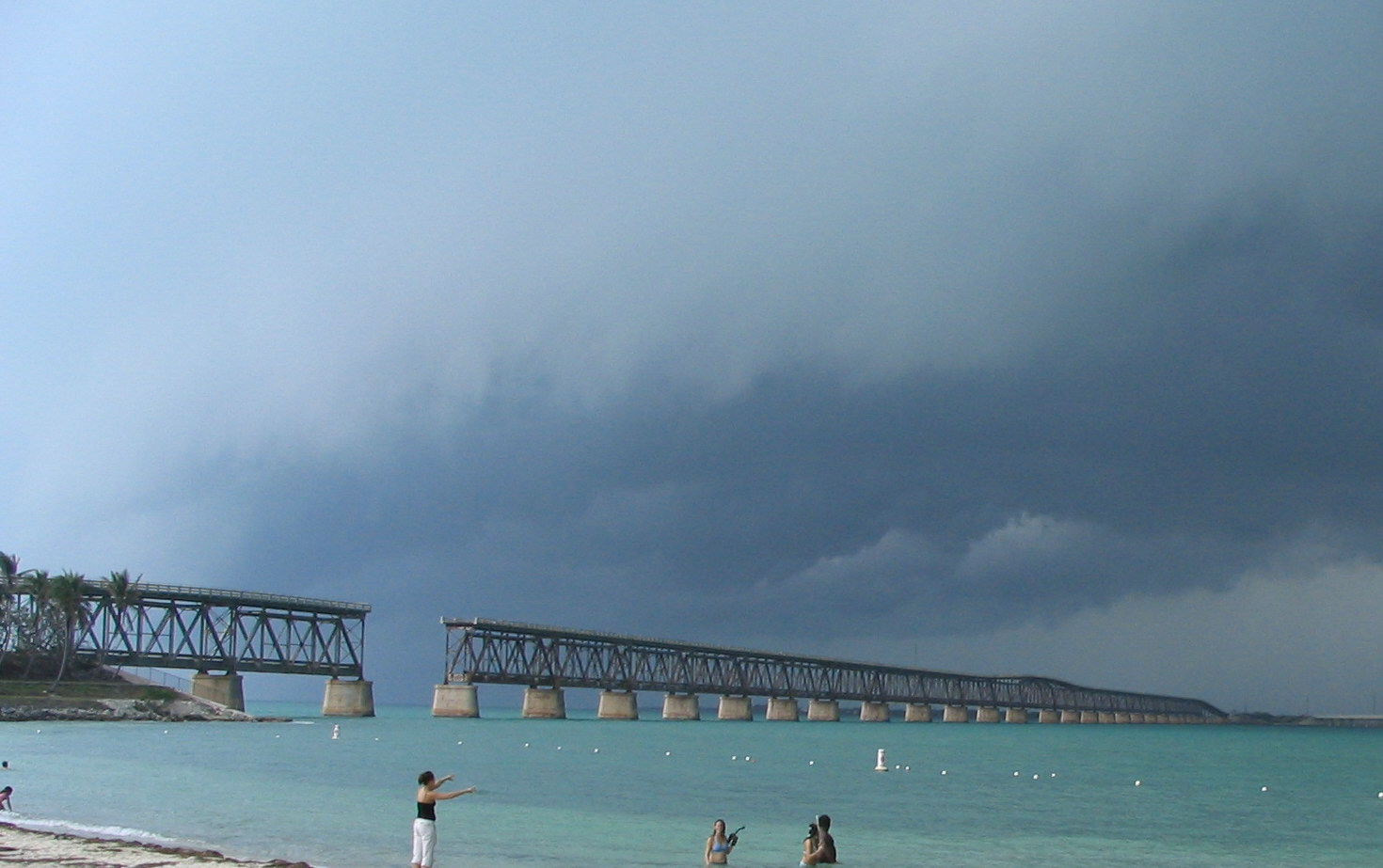
- View of the Bahia Honda Bridge from Bahia Honda State Park.
- Coordinates: 24.65520°N 81.29253°W
- Carries: Single track of Florida East Coast Railway, North and Southbound lanes of U.S. Route 1
- Crosses: Bahia Honda Channel
- Locale: Connects Bahia Honda Key and Spanish Harbor Key

Characteristics
- Design: Parker (Camelback) Truss Bridge with Pratt Truss and Plate Girder approaches
- Total length: 5,055 feet (1,541 m)
- Longest span: 247 feet (75 m)

History
- Opened: 1912 as rail bridge, converted to highway use in 1938
- Closed: 1972

The Bahia Honda Rail Bridge is a derelict railroad bridge in the lower Florida Keys connecting Bahia Honda Key with Spanish Harbor Key. It was originally part of the Overseas Railway, but the state of Florida purchased it from the Florida East Coast Railway (FEC) after the 1935 Labor Day Hurricane and converted it for automobile use as part of the Overseas Highway in 1938. After a replacement Bahia Honda Bridge was opened in 1972, two spans of the old bridge were removed for the safety of boat traffic and to prevent pedestrian access to unsafe parts of the bridge.

== History ==
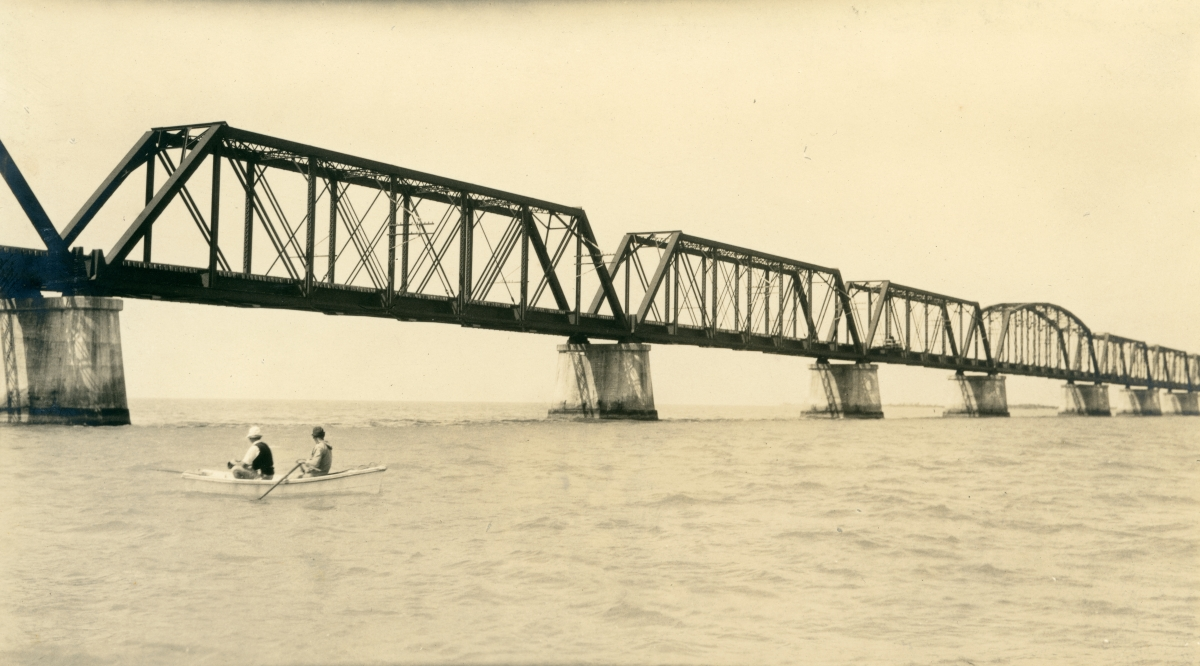
Bahia Honda Bridge during railroad operation (before highway conversion)

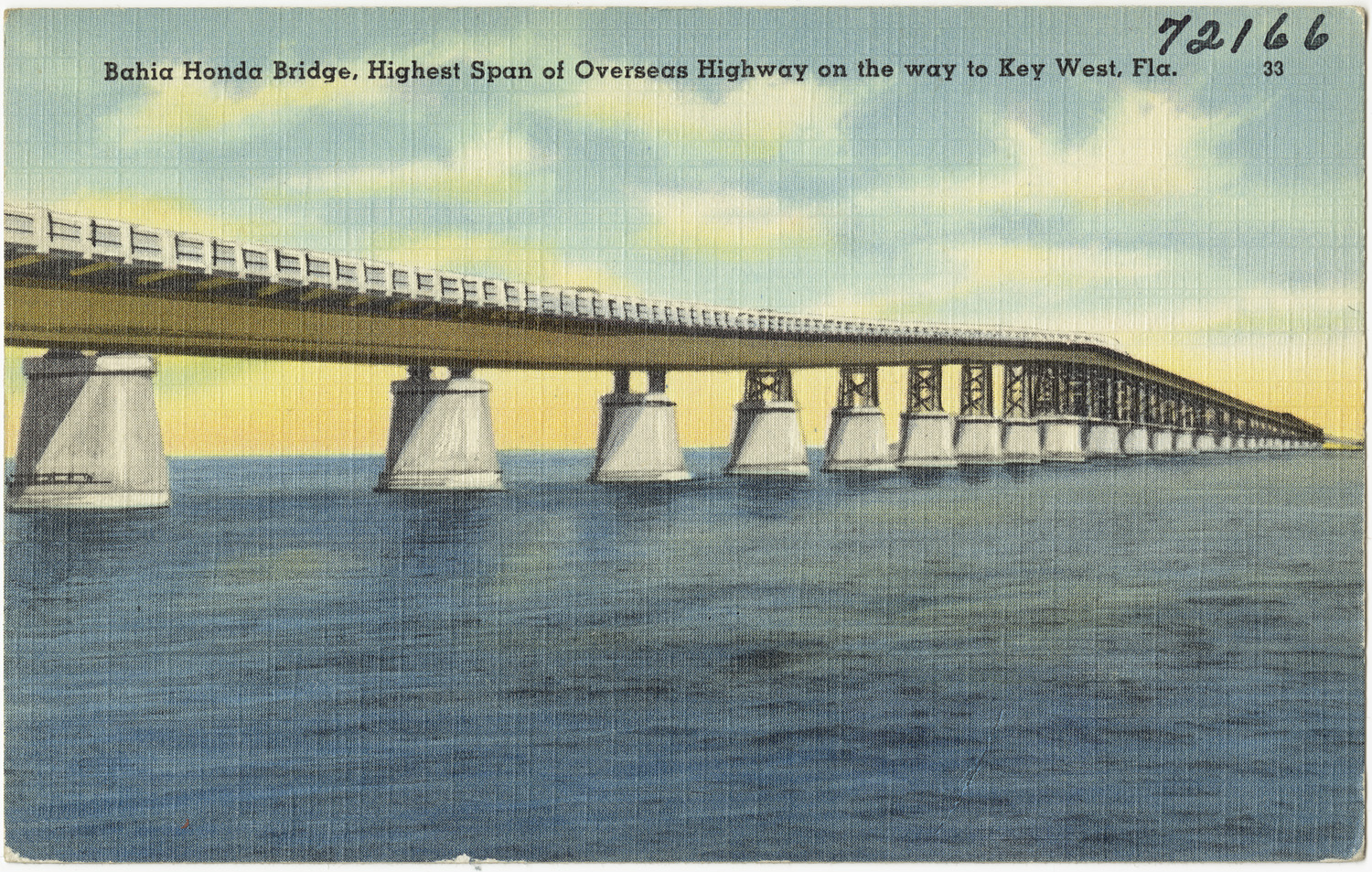
Postcard of the bridge during operation for highway use.

The Bahia Honda railroad bridge was originally built by Henry Flagler as part of the FEC's Overseas Railroad. Opened in 1912, Flagler funded the railway construction between Miami and Key West using his own personal funds. The Labor Day Hurricane of 1935 destroyed much of the line, and FEC sought abandonment. It was purchased by the state of Florida and converted for highway use in 1938. Rather than rebuilding the bridge, the top of the structure was redecked for use as the Overseas Highway (the existing deck inside the truss was too narrow for vehicular traffic).

A new four-lane bridge was built and opened in 1972, a few hundred yards north of the old bridge, replacing the former route of U.S. 1. Two of the truss spans have been removed. One near the east end to allow boat traffic to pass through Bahia Honda Channel without the danger of falling debris from the old bridge; the other at the westernmost end to prevent pedestrians from accessing unsafe parts of the bridge. It is a misconception the trusses were removed in order to facilitate traffic for boats needing higher vertical clearance, as the new bridge has roughly the same vertical clearance of about 20 feet (6.1 m). The original bridge has fallen into a state of disrepair; signs have been posted on the bridge warning boat traffic to watch for falling debris, but all of the sections have remained standing (not counting the two that were removed). The easternmost section remains open to pedestrian traffic and is maintained by Bahia Honda State Park. The bridge provides a scenic overview of the area for tourists.

== Structural design ==
Before being reused as a highway bridge, the Bahia Honda Rail Bridge carried a single track of FEC across Big Spanish Channel from Bahia Honda Key to Spanish Harbor Key. Unlike other bridges on the Overseas Railway, the Bahia Honda has a steel truss construction. This was a necessary difference from the predominant concrete arch form of the other bridges of the Overseas Railroad, as the channel is the deepest of those spanned, at 24 feet (7.3 m). The central span is a Parker truss with a span of 247 feet (75 m). This is surrounded by 13 Pratt truss sections spanning 186 feet (57 m) on either side, and 13 smaller Pratt trusses each spanning 128 feet (39 m) outside those. Nine plate girder sections were used for the western approach, for a total length of 5,055 feet (1,541 m). The smaller Pratt trusses have riveted connections, but the larger Pratt and Parker trusses use pinned connections, making the Bahia Honda Rail Bridge the longest pin-connected truss bridge in the U.S.

The original construction of the bridge was carried out by William Krome and Joseph Meredith, and the vehicular conversion was undertaken by B.M. Duncan.

== Gallery ==
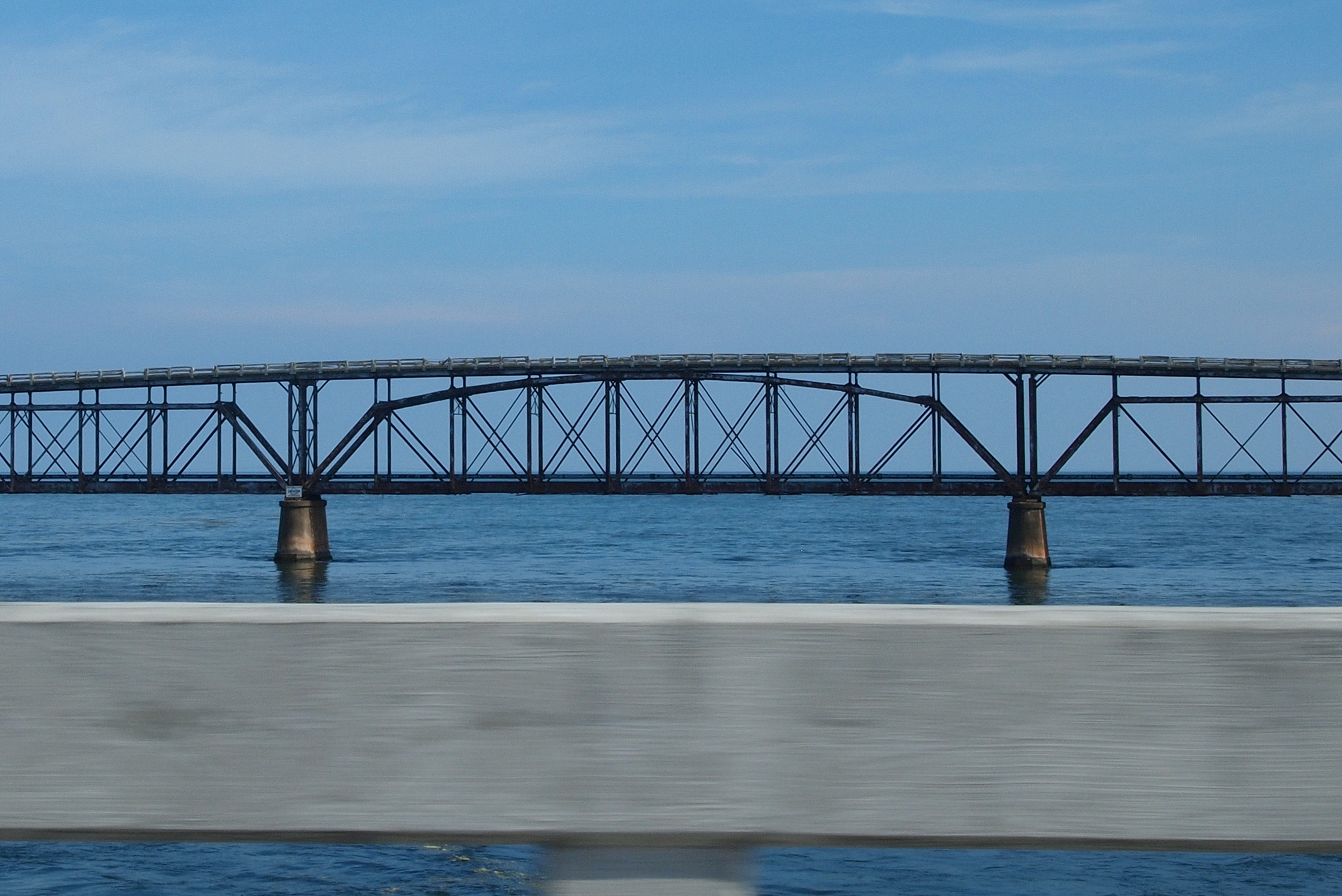
Parker deck-trussed span

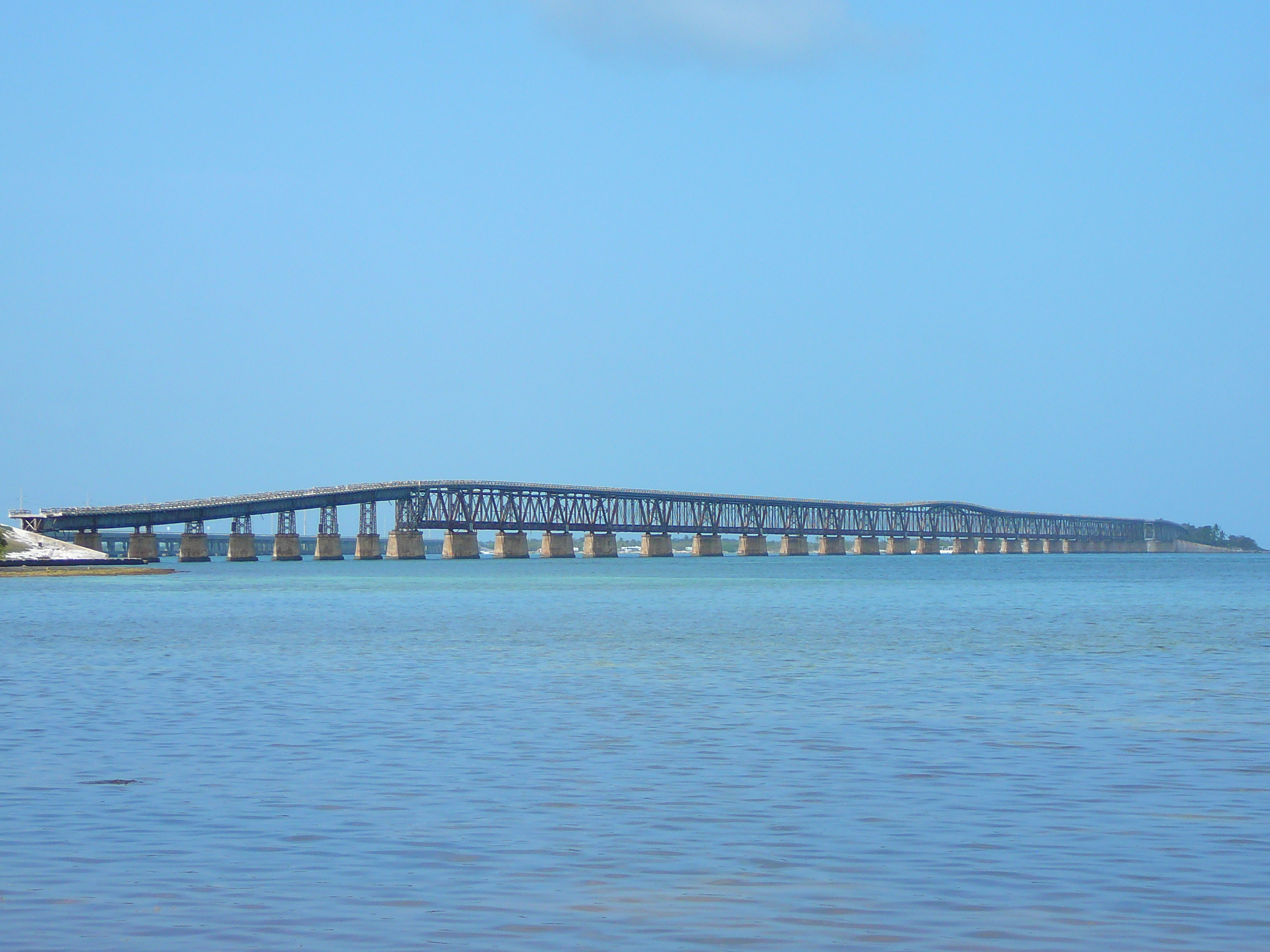
Bridge seen from Spanish Harbor Key

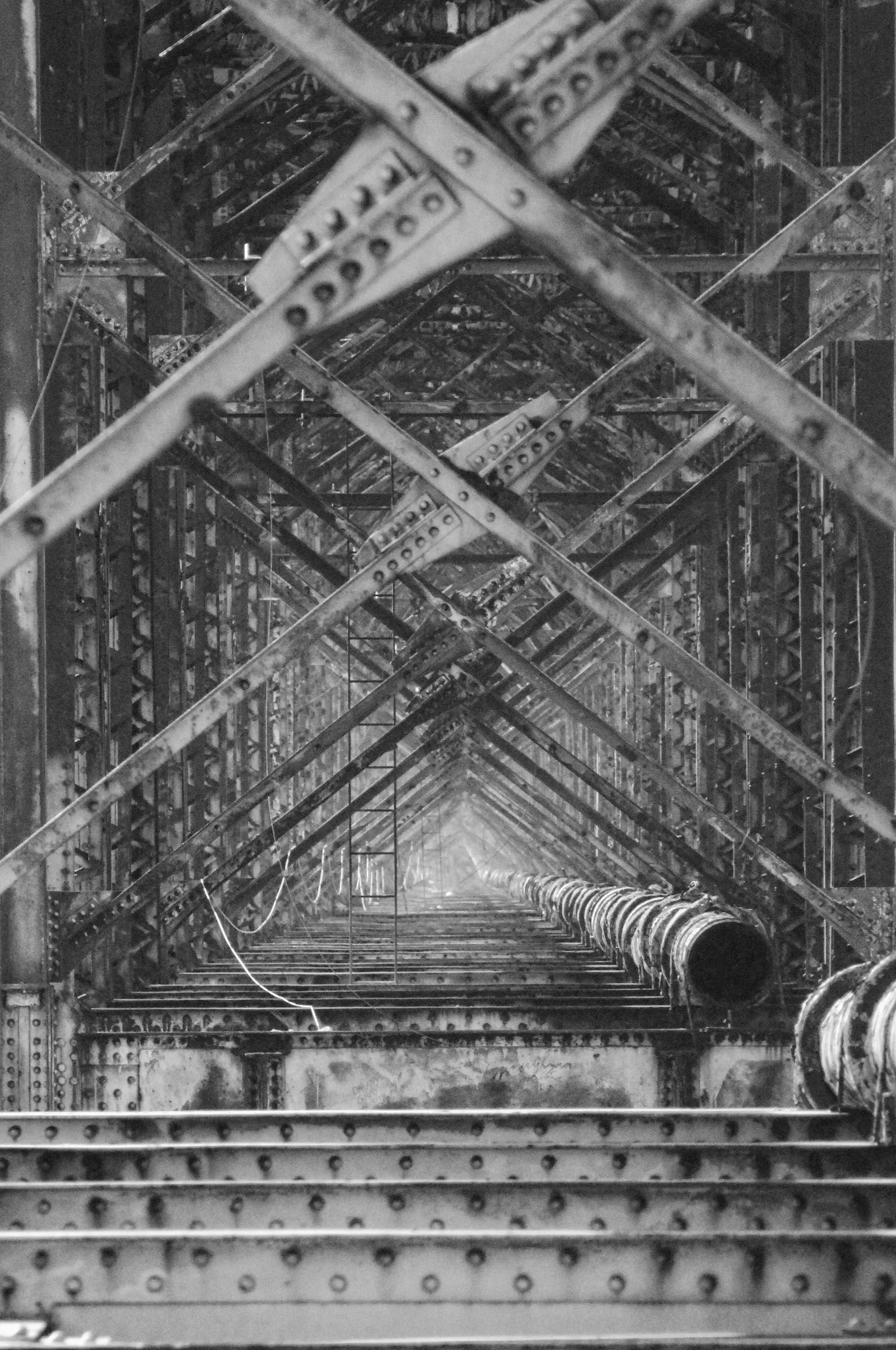
View underneath at Bahia Honda Key

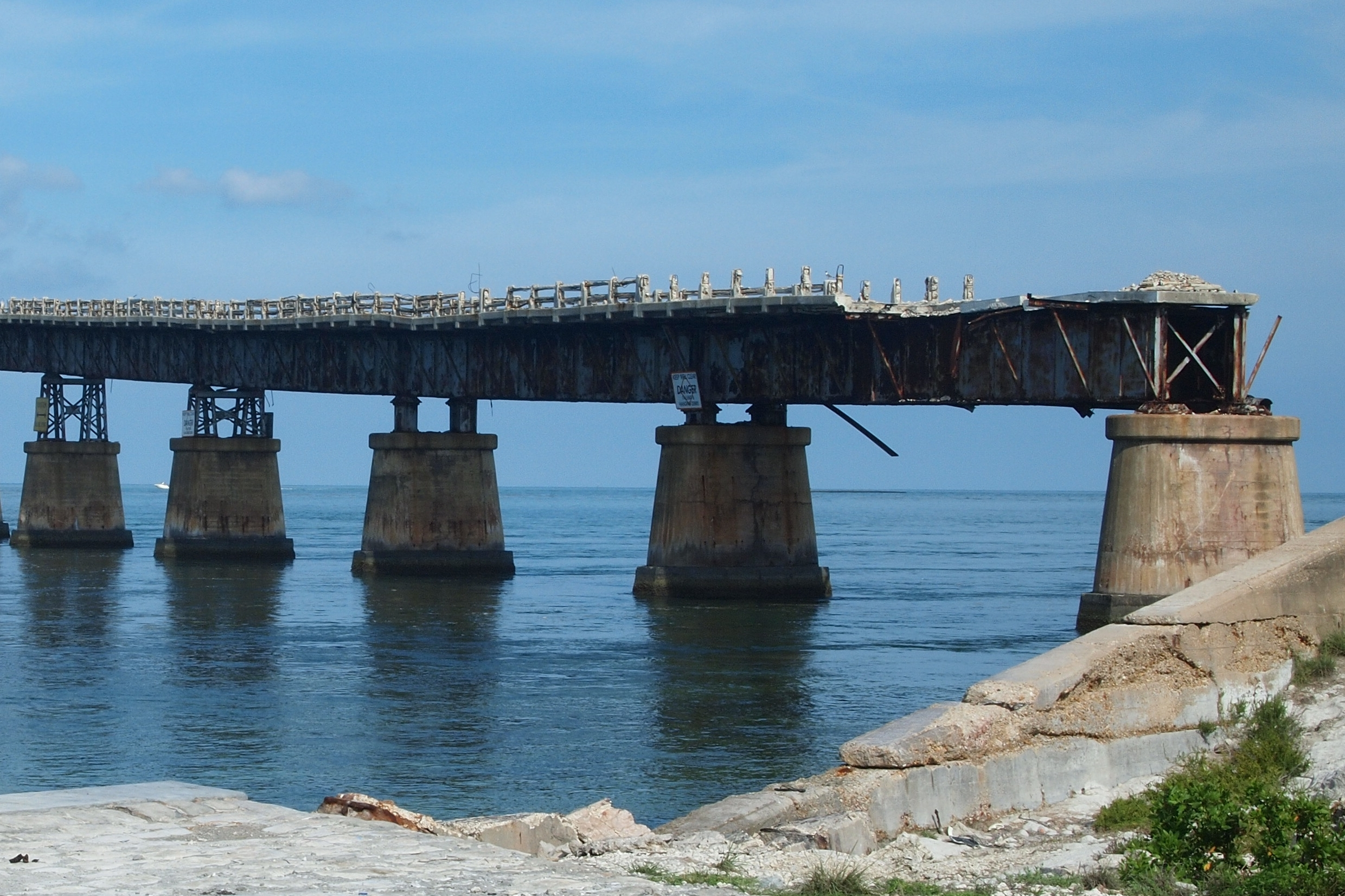
Plate girder sections on Spanish Harbor Key side

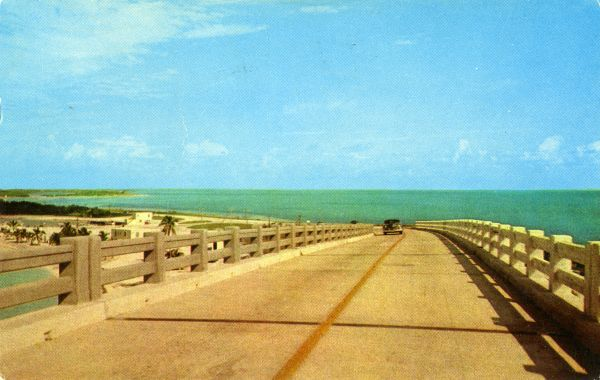
View from the bridge in 1961

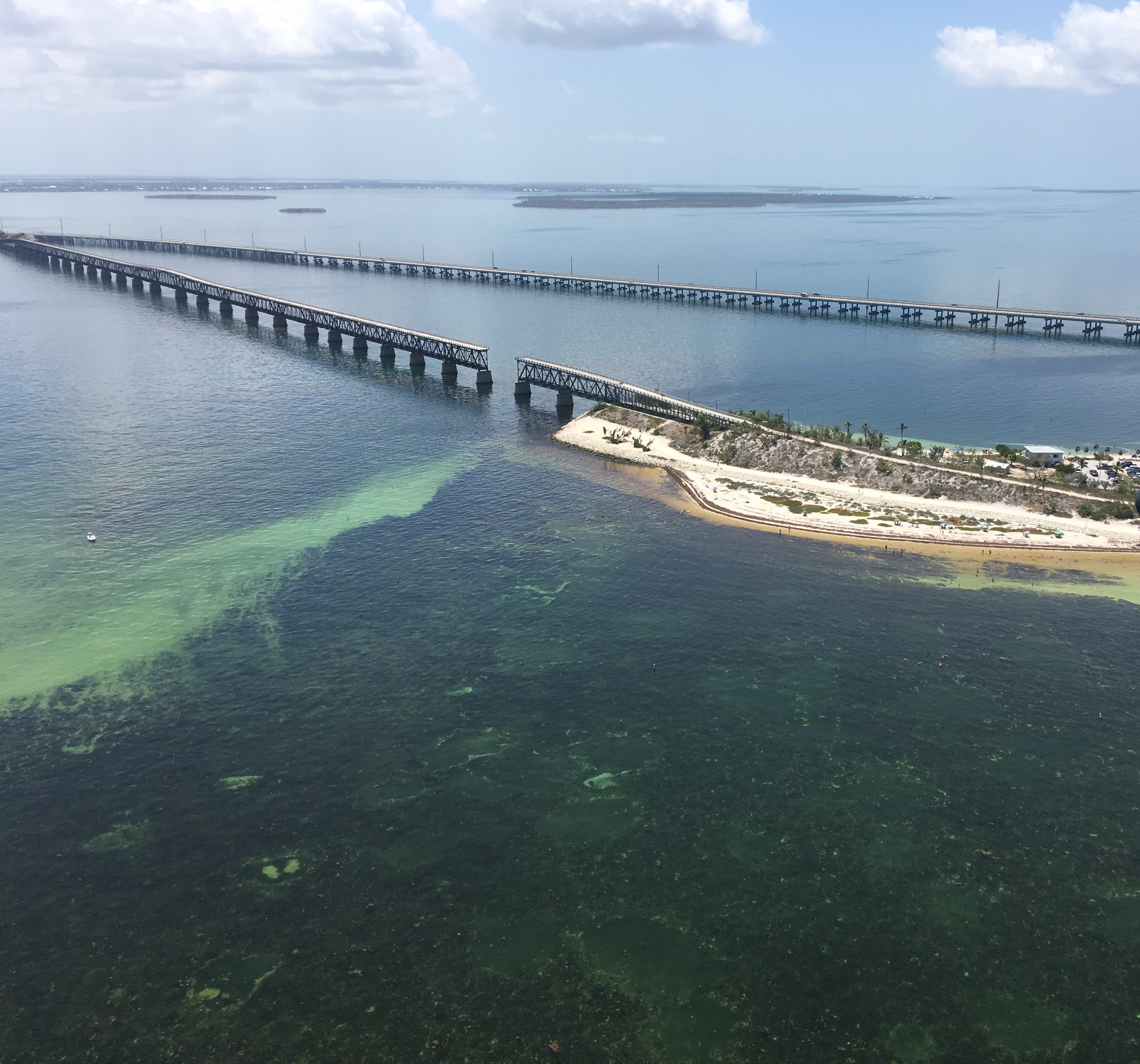
Aerial view, with the modern bridge in the background

== See also ==
- Overseas Railroad
- Overseas Highway
- Bahia Honda Key
- History of the Florida East Coast Railway
