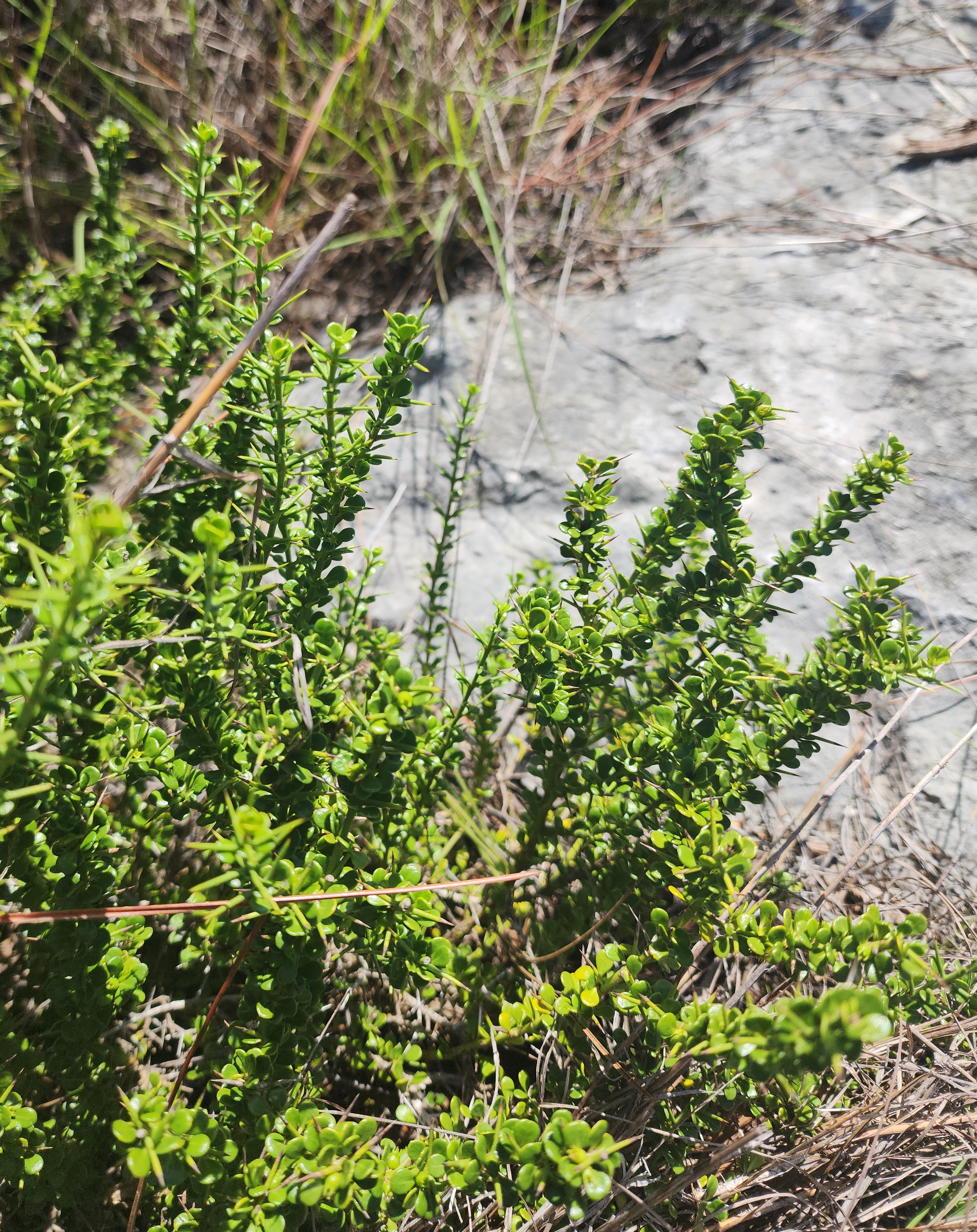
- Growing in open-canopy pine rockland habitat

Conservation status
- Vulnerable (NatureServe)

Scientific classification
- Kingdom: Plantae
- Clade: Tracheophytes
- Clade: Angiosperms
- Clade: Eudicots
- Clade: Asterids
- Order: Gentianales
- Family: Rubiaceae
- Genus: Catesbaea
- Species: C. parviflora

Binomial name
- Catesbaea parviflora Sw.

Synonyms
- Catesbya parviflora Swartz

= Catesbaea parviflora =

Species of flowering plant

Catesbaea parviflora, commonly referred to as small-flower lilythorn, is a species of flowering plant in the family Rubiaceae native to the Caribbean (including Cuba, Jamaica, Puerto Rico, and the Bahamas) and the Florida Keys.

== Habitat ==
In Florida it is known from pinelands, rocklands, hammocks, and coastal berms.

== Conservation ==
The species, despite its considerable geographic distribution, is not locally abundant and is known from few sites. It is primarily threatened by habitat loss to development and overcollection.

In Florida, it is only known to persist in two keys: Bahia Honda Key and Big Pine Key. As such, NatureServe regards it as critically imperiled in Florida.
