= Spanish Harbor Key =

Island in the lower Florida Keys, United States

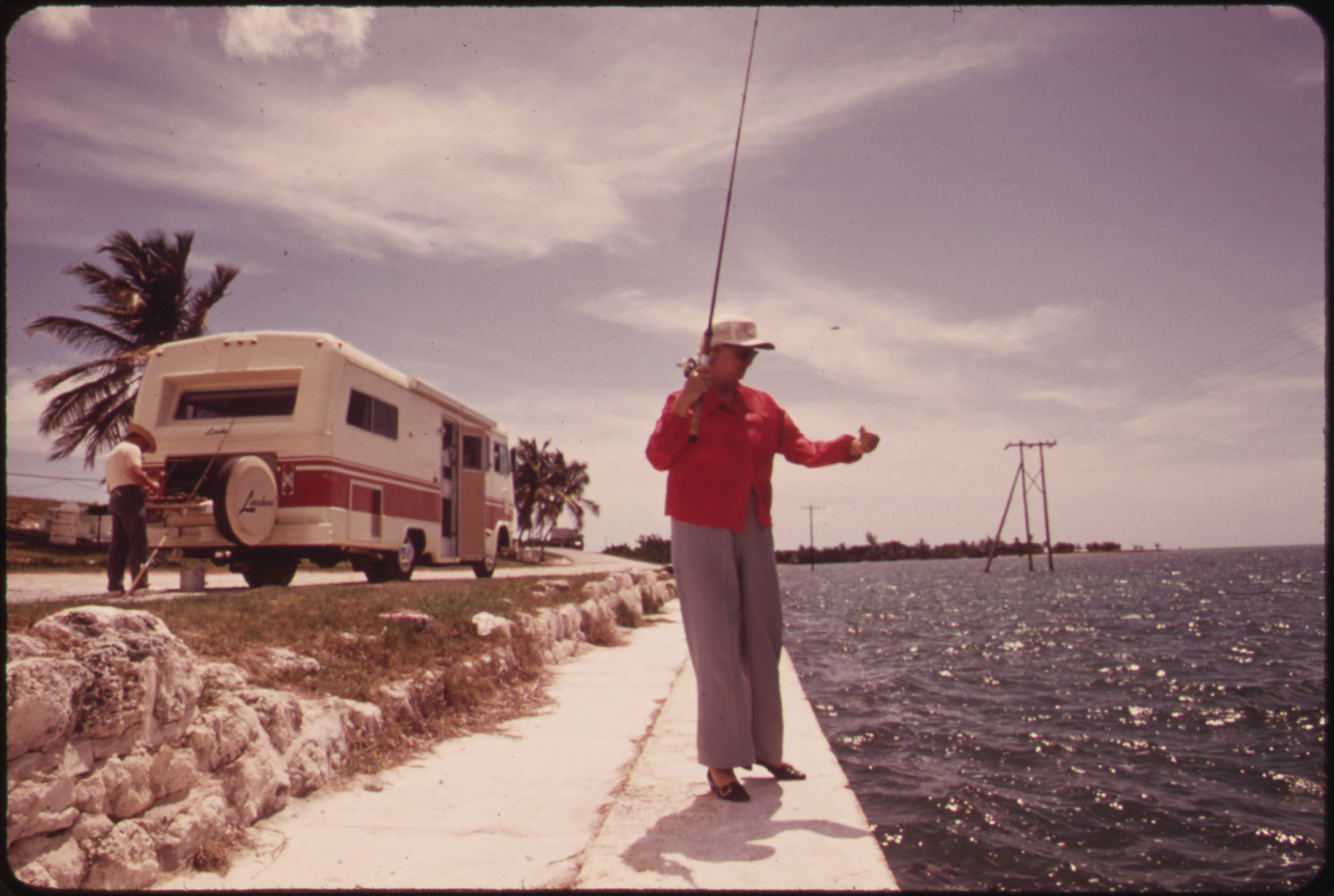
- Fishing on Spanish Harbor Key, 1973

- Spanish Harbor Key Spanish Harbor Key (the Caribbean)

Geography
- Location: Gulf of Mexico
- Coordinates: 24.652°N 81.307°W
- Archipelago: Florida Keys
- Adjacent to: Florida Straits

Administration
- United States
- State: Florida
- County: Monroe

Spanish Harbor Key is an island in the lower Florida Keys.

U.S. 1 (the Overseas Highway) crosses the keys at approximately mile markers 35–36, between Bahia Honda Key and West Summerland Key.

Spanish Harbor Key is a small island located in the lower Florida Keys, which are part of the Florida Keys archipelago. The island is situated between the larger islands of Big Pine Key and Cudjoe Key. It is not a highly developed area, and much of it remains relatively undeveloped, offering a more natural, scenic environment. The Florida Keys, known for their tropical climate and coral reefs, are a popular destination for boating, fishing, and outdoor activities.

Originally, there were three keys at this location. They were connected by fills at the time the Overseas Railroad was built. The Keys were West Summerland Key (westernmost), Middle Summerland Key (center), and an unnamed easternmost key. West Summerland retains its name, but the other two are known simply as the Spanish Harbor Keys; named for the anchorage located between this key and Big Pine Key. Interesting features of this key include Indian mounds and storage buildings still standing from the Flagler Railway construction era.
