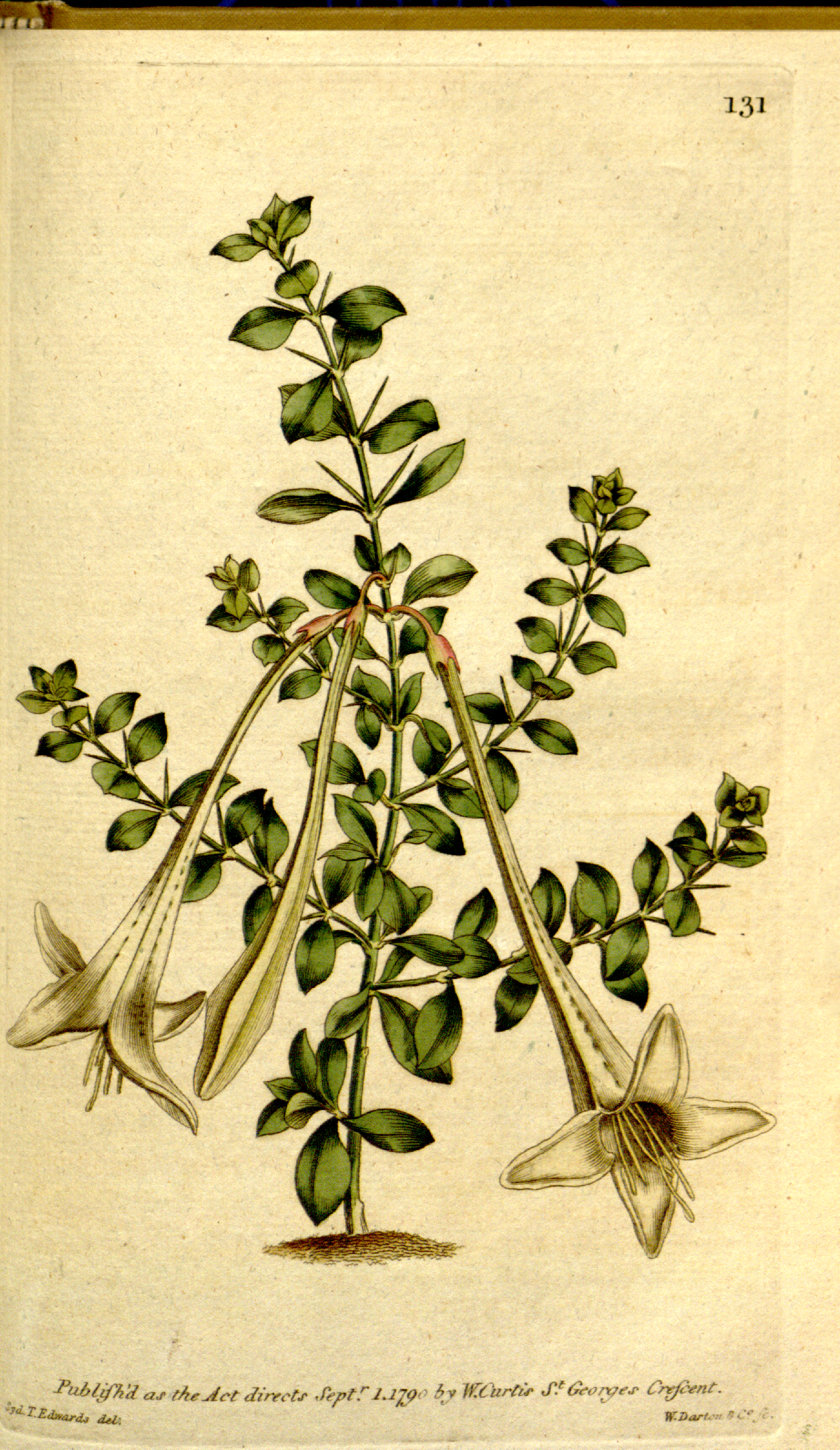
- Catesbaea spinosa

Scientific classification
- Kingdom: Plantae
- Clade: Tracheophytes
- Clade: Angiosperms
- Clade: Eudicots
- Clade: Asterids
- Order: Gentianales
- Family: Rubiaceae
- Subfamily: Cinchonoideae
- Tribe: Chiococceae
- Genus: Catesbaea; L.

Type species
- Catesbaea spinosa L.

Synonyms
- Phyllacanthus Hook.f.

= Catesbaea =

Lilythorn

Genus of plants

Catesbaea is a genus of flowering plants in the family Rubiaceae. It occurs in the West Indies, The Bahamas, and the Florida Keys. The genus is named in honour of English naturalist Mark Catesby.

== Species ==
- Catesbaea ekmaniana Urb. - Haiti
- Catesbaea flaviflora Urb. - Cuba
- Catesbaea foliosa Millsp. - Bahamas, Turks and Caicos Islands
- Catesbaea fuertesii Urb. - Dominican Republic
- Catesbaea gamboana Urb. - Cuba
- Catesbaea glabra Urb. - Dominican Republic, Haiti
- Catesbaea grayi Griseb. - Cuba, Haiti
- Catesbaea holacantha C.Wright ex Griseb. - Cuba
- Catesbaea longispina A.Rich. - Cuba
- Catesbaea macrantha C.Wright - Cuba
- Catesbaea melanocarpa Urb. - tropical lilythorn - Puerto Rico, Leeward Islands
- Catesbaea microcarpa Urb. - Haiti
- Catesbaea nana Greenm. - Cuba
- Catesbaea parviflora Sw. - smallflower lilythorn or dune lilythorn - Florida Keys, Bahamas, Turks and Caicos Islands, Cayman Islands, Cuba, Dominican Republic, Haiti, Jamaica, Puerto Rico
- Catesbaea parvifolia DC. - Dominican Republic, Haiti
- Catesbaea sphaerocarpa Urb. - Haiti
- Catesbaea spinosa L. - Cuba, Bahamas
