= List of islands of Florida =

The U.S. state of Florida has a total of 4,510 islands that are ten acres or larger. This is the second-highest number of islands of any state of the United States; only Alaska has more.

Major island chains include the Florida Keys, the Ten Thousand Islands, the Sea Islands, and the barrier islands of the Atlantic coast, the Panhandle Gulf of Mexico coast, and the Tampa Bay Area and Southwest Florida Gulf coast.

Island	Image	Size	County	Notes
Adams Key			Miami-Dade	In Biscayne National Park. Home to the former Cocolobo Cay Club owned by Carl Fisher.
Allison Island			Miami-Dade	
Amelia Island		18 square miles (47 km^{2})	Nassau	One of the Sea Islands
Anastasia Island		14 square miles (36 km^{2})	St. Johns	Barrier island
Anna Maria Island		7 square miles (18 km^{2})	Manatee	Barrier island
Archer Key		24.7 ha; 61.1 acres	Monroe	One of the Mule Keys in the lower Florida Keys
Arsenicker Keys			Miami-Dade	In Biscayne National Park
Atsena Otie Key			Levy	One of the Cedar Keys
Bahia Honda Key		524 acres (212 ha)	Monroe	In the lower Florida Keys
Ballast Key		4.68 ha; 11.6 acres	Monroe	One of the Mule Keys in the lower Florida Keys
Barracouta Key		47.2 ha; 117 acres	Monroe	One of the Mule Keys in the lower Florida Keys
Belle Isle			Miami-Dade	Artificial island in the Venetian Islands in Biscayne Bay
Big Coppitt Key			Monroe	In the lower Florida Keys
Big Mullet Key		8.72 ha; 21.6 acres	Monroe	One of the Mule Keys in the lower Florida Keys
Big Pine Key		9.8 square miles (25 km^{2})	Monroe	In the lower Florida Keys
Big Talbot Island			Duval	One of the Sea Islands
Big Torch Key			Monroe	In the lower Florida Keys
Bird Key		1.2 square miles (3.1 km^{2})	Sarasota	Barrier island
Bird Key			Miami-Dade	in Biscayne Bay
Biscayne Island			Miami-Dade	Artificial island in the Venetian Island in Biscayne Bay
Black Hammock Island			Duval	In a marsh
Blount Island		2,000 acres (810 ha)	Duval	In the St. Johns River
Boca Chica Key			Monroe	In the lower Florida Keys
Boca Chita Key			Miami-Dade	In Biscayne National Park
Boca Grande		3 square miles (7.8 km^{2})	Monroe	One of the Mule Keys in the lower Florida Keys
Boot Key			Monroe	In the middle Florida Keys
Brickell Key		1.19 square miles (3.1 km^{2})	Miami-Dade	Artificial island in Biscayne Bay
Caesar's Rock			Miami-Dade	In Biscayne National Park
Caladesi Island		3 square miles (7.8 km^{2})	Pinellas	Barrier island
Cape St. George Island			Franklin	Barrier island
Casey Key			Sarasota	Barrier island
Captiva Island		4 square miles (10 km^{2})	Lee	Barrier island
Cayo Costa		2,506 acres (1,014 ha)	Lee	Barrier island
Cedar Key			Levy	One of the Cedar Keys
Chokoloskee Island		0.23 square miles (0.60 km^{2})	Collier	In the Ten Thousand Islands
City Island		0.7 square miles (1.8 km^{2})	Volusia	In the Intracoastal Waterway
Clearwater Beach Island			Pinellas	Barrier island
Coconut Island			Collier	Small barrier island
Conch Key			Monroe	In the middle Florida Keys
Cottrell Key		53.4 acres (21.6 ha)	Monroe	One of the Mule Keys in the lower Florida Keys
Craig Key			Monroe	In the upper Florida Keys
Crawfish Key		4.23 acres (1.71 ha)	Monroe	One of the Mule Keys in the lower Florida Keys
Crawl Key			Monroe	In the middle Florida Keys
Cudjoe Key			Monroe	In the lower Florida Keys
Davis Islands			Hillsborough	Two artificial islands in Tampa Bay
Deerfield Beach Island			Broward (part); Palm Beach (part)	Barrier island
Demere Key			Lee	In Pine Island Sound
Di Lido Island			Miami-Dade	In the Venetian Islands
Dildo Key		0.12 square miles (0.3 km^{2})	Monroe	In Everglades National Park
Discovery Island		12 acres (4.9 ha)	Orange	Island formerly used as an attraction at Walt Disney World Resort
Dismal Key			Monroe	In the Ten Thousand Islands
Dog Island		1,842 acres (745 ha)	Franklin	Barrier island
Don Pedro Island			Charlotte County	Barrier island
Drayton Island		1,700 acres (690 ha)	Putnam	In Lake George
Dry Tortugas			Monroe	In Dry Tortugas National Park
Duck Key			Monroe	In the middle Florida Keys
East Rockland Key			Monroe	In the lower Florida Keys
Egmont Key		328 acres (133 ha)	Hillsborough	Barrier island
Elliott Key			Miami-Dade	Largest island in Biscayne National Park
Estero Island			Lee	Barrier island
Fat Deer Key			Monroe	In the middle Florida Keys
Fiesta Key			Monroe	In the upper Florida Keys
Fisher Island		222 acres (90 ha)	Miami-Dade	Barrier island
Flagler Monument Island		4 acres (1.6 ha)	Miami-Dade	Artificial island in Biscayne Bay
Fleming Key			Monroe	In the lower Florida Keys
Fort George Island			Duval	One of the Sea Islands
Galt Island			Lee	In Pine Island Sound
Gasparilla Island		7 square miles (18 km^{2})	Charlotte and Lee counties	Barrier island
Geiger Key			Monroe	In the lower Florida Keys
Grassy Key			Monroe	In the middle Florida Keys
Grove Isle		20 acres (8.1 ha)	Miami-Dade	Artificial island in Biscayne Bay
Hibiscus Island			Miami-Dade	Artificial island in Biscayne Bay
Honeymoon Island		385 acres (156 ha)	Pinellas	Barrier island
Hontoon Island		1,648 acres (667 ha)	Volusia	In St. Johns River
Hutchinson Island		23.86 square miles (61.8 km^{2})	Martin (part); St. Lucie (part)	Barrier island
Hypoluxo Island		2.7 square miles (7.0 km^{2})	Palm Beach	An island in Lake Worth Lagoon
Indian Key		12 acres (4.9 ha)	Monroe	In the Florida Keys
Joe Ingram Key		1.00 ha; 2.47 acres	Monroe	One of the Mule Keys in the lower Florida Keys
Jupiter Island		3.56 square miles (9.2 km^{2})	Martin (part); Palm Beach (part)	Barrier island
Keywaydin Island			Collier	Barrier island
Key Biscayne		5 square miles (13 km^{2})	Miami-Dade	Barrier island
Key Largo			Monroe	In the upper Florida Keys
Key Marco			Collier	In the Ten Thousand Islands
Key Vaca			Monroe	In the middle Florida Keys
Key West		5.27 square miles (13.6 km^{2})	Monroe	In the lower Florida Keys
Knights Key			Monroe	In the middle Florida Keys
Knockemdown Key			Monroe	In the lower Florida Keys
Kreamer Island			Palm Beach	In Lake Okeechobee
Lido Key		530 acres (210 ha)	Sarasota	Barrier island
Lignumvitae Key		300 acres (120 ha)	Monroe	In the upper Florida Keys
Little Conch Key			Monroe	In the middle Florida Keys
Little Crawl Key			Monroe	In the middle Florida Keys
Little Duck Key			Monroe	In the lower Florida Keys
Little Gasparilla Island			Charlotte	Barrier island
Little Mullet Key		5.86 ha; 14.5 acres	Monroe	One of the Mule Keys in the lower Florida Keys
Little Talbot Island		3.9 square miles (10 km^{2})	Duval	One of the Sea Islands
Little Torch Key			Monroe	In the lower Florida Keys
Loggerhead Key		49 acres (20 ha)	Monroe	In the Dry Tortugas
Lois Key			Monroe	In the lower Florida Keys
Long Key			Monroe	In the middle Florida Keys
Longboat Key		16 square miles (41 km^{2})	Sarasota (part); Manatee (part)	Barrier island
Long Point Key			Monroe	In the middle Florida Keys
Lovers Key			Lee	Barrier island
Lower Matecumbe Key			Monroe	In the upper Florida Keys
Makinson Island			Osceola	In Lake Tohopekaliga
Man Key		35.9 ha; 88.7 acres	Monroe	One of the Mule Keys in the lower Florida Keys
Manasota Key		3.089 square miles (8.00 km^{2})	Charlotte (part); Sarasota (part)	Barrier island
Marco Island		12.1 square miles (31 km^{2})	Collier	Barrier island
Marquesas Keys		2.541 square miles (6.58 km^{2})	Monroe	In the lower Florida Keys
Meig's Key			Monroe	In Biscayne National Park
Melody Key		6 acres (2.4 ha)	Monroe	In the lower Florida Keys
Merritt Island		46.16 square miles (119.6 km^{2})	Brevard	Barrier island
Miami Beach			Miami-Dade	Barrier island
Middle Torch Key			Monroe	In the Florida Keys
Missouri Key			Monroe	In the lower Florida Keys
Molasses Keys			Monroe	In the lower Florida Keys
Money Key			Monroe	In the lower Florida Keys
Mule Key		5.22 ha; 12.9 acres	Monroe	One of the Mule Keys in the lower Florida Keys
Mule Keys		263 ha; 649 acres	Monroe	In the lower Florida Keys
Mullet Key			Citrus	Island in the Gulf of Mexico
Munyon Island			Palm Beach	In Lake Worth Lagoon
No Name Key			Monroe	In the lower Florida Keys
North Captiva Island		4 square miles (10 km^{2})	Lee County	Barrier island
North Hutchinson Island/ Orchid Island		23.86 square miles (61.8 km^{2})	Indian River (part); St. Lucie (part)	Barrier island
Ohio Key			Monroe	In the lower Florida Keys
Old Rhodes Key			Miami-Dade	In the upper Florida Keys
Palm Beach Island		8.12 square miles (21.0 km^{2})	Palm Beach	Barrier island
Palm Island			Miami-Dade	Artificial island in Biscayne Bay
Palm Key			Monroe	In Florida Bay
Paradise Island			Osceola	In Lake Tohopekaliga
Park Key		70 acres (28 ha)	Monroe	In the lower Florida Keys
Peanut Island		0.32 square kilometres (0.12 sq mi)	Palm Beach	Artificial island in Lake Worth Lagoon
Pelican Island		3 acres (1.2 ha)	St. Lucie	In the Indian River
Perdido Key			Escambia	Barrier island
Perico Island			Manatee	In Tampa Bay
Picnic Islands			Miami-Dade	Small group of artificial islands in Biscayne Bay
Pigeon Key		5 acres (2.0 ha)	Monroe	In the middle Florida Keys
Pine Island		18 square miles (47 km^{2})	Lee	Largest island in Florida
Plantation Key			Monroe	In the upper Florida Keys
Porgy Key			Miami-Dade	In Biscayne National Park
Ragged Keys			Miami-Dade	In Biscayne National Park
Ramrod Key			Monroe	In the lower Florida Keys
Rattlesnake Key			Manatee	In Tampa Bay
Reid Key			Miami-Dade	In Biscayne National Park
Ritta Island		5 square miles (13 km^{2})	Palm Beach	In Lake Okeechobee
Rivo Alto Island			Miami-Dade	Artificial island in the Venetian Islands in Biscayne Bay
Rockland Key			Monroe	In the lower Florida Keys
Rubicon Keys			Miami-Dade	In Biscayne National Park
Saddlebunch Keys			Monroe	In the lower Florida Keys
Sand Key		95 acres (38 ha)	Pinellas	Barrier island
Sands Key			Miami-Dade	In Biscayne National Park
Sandspur Island		15 acres (6.1 ha)	Miami-Dade	Artificial island in Biscayne Bay
Sanibel Island		33.25 square miles (86.1 km^{2})	Lee	Barrier island
San Marco Island			Miami-Dade	Artificial island in the Venetian Islands in Biscayne Bay
San Marino Island			Miami-Dade	Artificial island in the Venetian Islands in Biscayne Bay
Santa Rosa Island			Escambia (part); Santa Rosa (part); Okaloosa (part)	Barrier island
Scout Key			Monroe	In the lower Florida Keys
Shark Key			Monroe	In the lower Florida Keys
Shell Key			Pinellas	Barrier island
Siesta Key		8 square miles (21 km^{2})	Sarasota	Barrier Island
Sigsbee Park (Dredgers Key)			Monroe	Artificial island in the lower Florida Keys
Singer Island			Palm Beach	Barrier peninsula
Snead Island		0.75 square miles (1.9 km^{2})	Manatee	
Soldier Key			Miami-Dade	In Biscayne National Park
Spanish Harbor Key			Monroe	In the lower Florida Keys
St. Armands Key		83.6 acres (33.8 ha)	Sarasota	In Sarasota Bay
St. George Island		28 square miles (73 km^{2})	Franklin	Barrier island
St. James Island			Franklin	Separated from the mainland by the Crooked River
St. Vincent Island			Franklin	Barrier island
Star Island		0.4 square miles (1.0 km^{2})	Miami-Dade	Artificial island in Biscayne Bay
Stock Island			Monroe	In the lower Florida Keys
Sugarloaf Key			Monroe	In the lower Florida Keys
Summerland Key			Monroe	In the lower Florida Keys
Sunset Key		27 acres (11 ha)	Monroe	In the lower Florida Keys
Tea Table Key			Monroe	In the Florida Keys
Ten Thousand Islands			Collier (part); Monroe (part)	Chain of islands
Thousand Islands			Brevard	Group in the Banana River
Three Rooker Island			Pinellas	Barrier island
Torch Keys (Big, Little, and Middle Torch Keys)			Monroe	In the lower Florida Keys
Totten Key			Miami-Dade	In Biscayne National Park
Treasure Island			Pinellas	Barrier island
Upper Matecumbe Key			Monroe	In the upper Florida Keys
Useppa Island		1 square mile (2.6 km^{2})	Lee	In Pine Island Sound
Venetian Islands			Miami-Dade	Group of artificial islands in Biscayne Bay
Venice Island		16.81 square miles (43.5 km^{2})	Sarasota	Barrier island
Virginia Key		863 acres (349 ha)	Miami-Dade	Barrier island
Watson Island		179 acres (72 ha)	Miami-Dade	Artificial island in Biscayne Bay
Windley Key			Monroe	In the upper Florida Keys
Wisteria Island		10.6 ha; 26.3 acres	Monroe	In the lower Florida Keys
Woman Key		31.8 ha; 78.5 acres	Monroe	In the lower Florida Keys

== See also ==
- List of island municipalities in Florida
