= Dildo (disambiguation) =

A dildo is a sex toy.

Dildo may also refer to:

- Dildo, Newfoundland and Labrador, Canada
- Dildo Island, Canada
- Dildo Key, Florida, USA
- DLD (band), formerly Dildo, a Mexican rock band
- Dildo cactus (disambiguation), several species of long, narrow cactus

== See also ==
- DilDog, handle of Christien Rioux, cofounder and scientist for Veracode
- Armageddon Dildos, German electro-industrial musical duo
