= Man Key =

Island in the United States

- Man Key Man Key (the Caribbean)

Geography
- Location: Gulf of Mexico
- Coordinates: 24°31′40″N 81°55′38″W
- Archipelago: Florida Keys
- Adjacent to: Florida Straits

Administration
- United States
- State: Florida
- County: Monroe

Man Key is an island in the Florida Keys in Monroe County, Florida, United States. It is within the boundaries of the Key West National Wildlife Refuge.

Located in the Outlying Islands of the Florida Keys, it is in the southern Mule Keys that are 9 miles (15 km) west of Key West.

It is composed of three separate islets.

It is east of Ballast Key (24°31'23.0"N) which is the farthest south island, and it is also east of Woman Key. To the north of Man Key is Barracouta Key.
