= Woman Key =

Island in Monroe County, Florida, United States

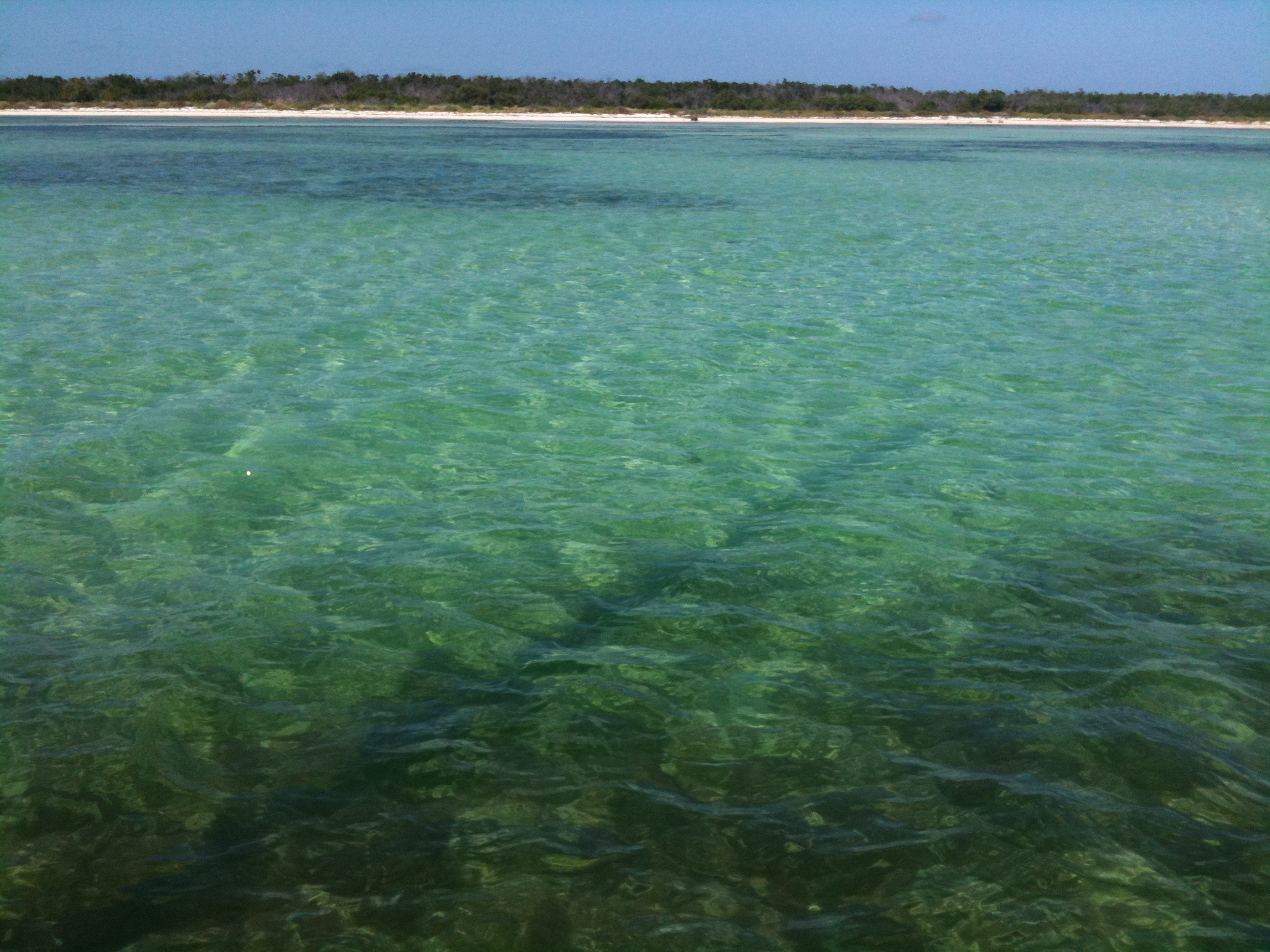
- Woman Key is an uninhabited mangrove island about 10 nautical miles from Key West

- Woman Key Woman Key (the Caribbean)

Geography
- Location: Gulf of Mexico
- Coordinates: 24.524333°N 81.973722°W

Administration
- United States
- State: Florida
- County: Monroe

Woman Key is an island in the Florida Keys in Monroe County, Florida, United States. It is within the boundaries of the Key West National Wildlife Refuge.

== Location ==
Located in the Outlying Islands of the Florida Keys, Woman Key is in the southern Mule Keys, which are 9 miles (14 km) west of Key West. To its east are Ballast Key (the island farthest south in the area (at 24°31′23.0″N) and Man Key.

Half of the island's south-facing beach, as well as the sand spit on the southeast side, are closed to protect wildlife.

== Nesting site ==
The beach and dunes are nesting sites for loggerhead sea turtles. Several species of wading birds also nest in the area and a large number of shorebirds use the sand spits on the southeast side of the island.
