= Sand Key (reef) =

Coral reef in the Florida Keys, US

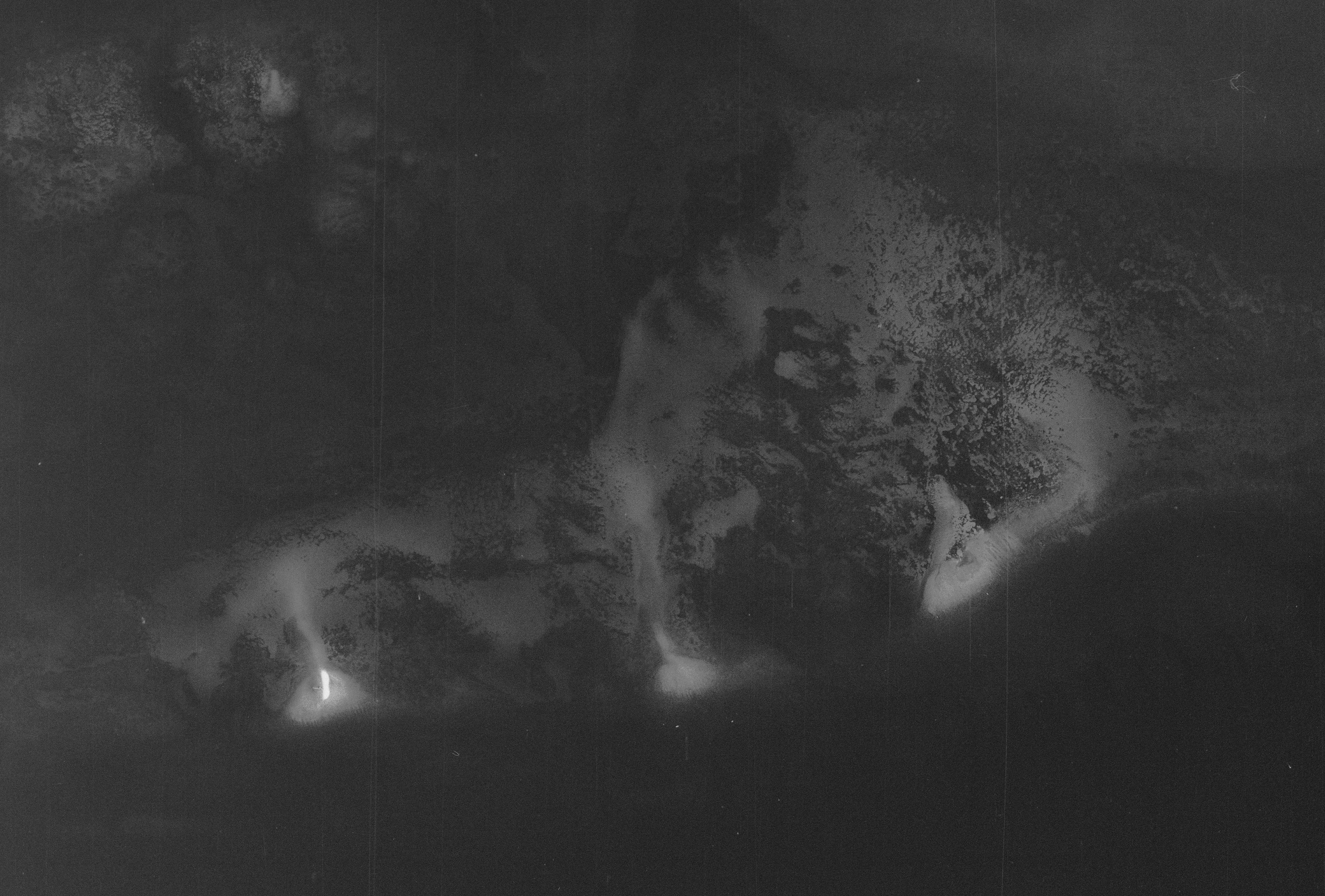
- Air photo taken in 1970 showing Sand Key (lower left), Rock Key (lower center), and Eastern Dry Rocks (lower right).

- Location within Florida Location within the Caribbean
- Summit depth: 1 - 35 feet

Location
- Location: Caribbean
- Coordinates: 24°27′15″N 81°52′40″W
- Country: United States

Geology
- Type: reef

Sand Key is a coral reef located within the Florida Keys National Marine Sanctuary. It lies to the southwest of Key West within the Key West National Wildlife Refuge and Hawk Channel. This reef is within a Sanctuary Preservation Area (SPA).

The Sand Key Light was built on the key. The reef lies to the south of the light.

== See also ==
- Rock Key
- Eastern Dry Rocks
