= Eastern Dry Rocks =

Coral reef in the Florida Keys, US

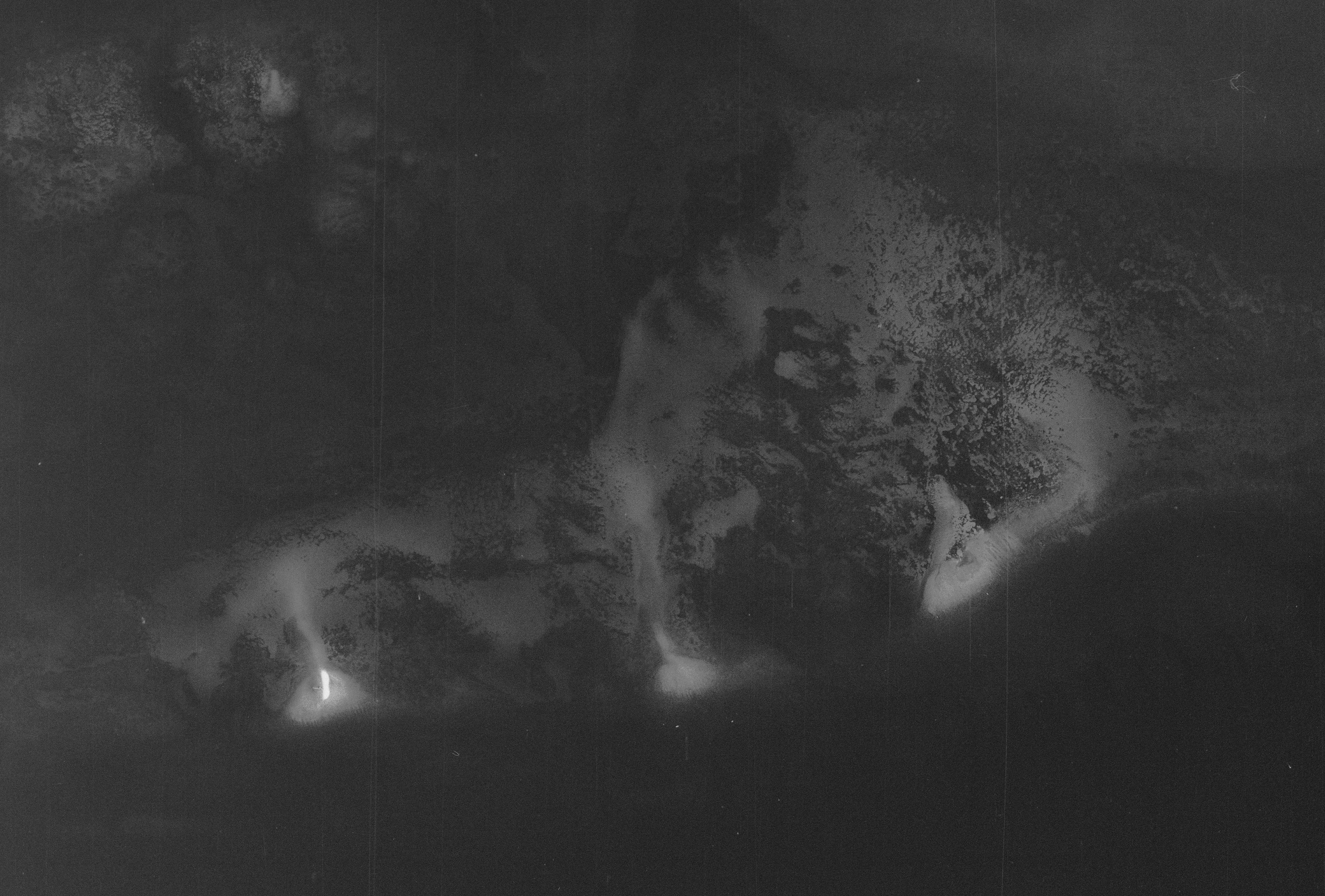
- Air photo taken in 1970 showing Sand Key (lower left), Rock Key (lower center), and Eastern Dry Rocks (lower right).

- Location within Florida Location within the Caribbean
- Summit depth: 1 - 35 feet

Location
- Location: Caribbean
- Coordinates: 24°27′37″N 81°50′35″W
- Country: United States

Geology
- Type: reef

Eastern Dry Rocks is a coral reef located within the Florida Keys National Marine Sanctuary. It lies seven miles southeast of Key West and one mile east of Sand Key light within the Key West National Wildlife Refuge. This reef is within a Sanctuary Preservation Area (SPA).

== Composition ==
The Eastern Dry Rocks Reef includes rubble zones and long fingers of coral separated by deeper sand and coral canyons.

== Diving and snorkeling ==
The Eastern Dry Rocks reef is a popular spot for diving and/or snorkeling. It is also quite close to multiple other reefs including Sand Key and Rock Key, so it is common for divers and snorkelers to see multiple reefs on one outing.

== Marine life ==
One can find many different kinds of fish and other marine creatures at the reef. Common species include nurse and hammerhead sharks, brain coral, snook, stingray, cleaner shrimp, reef crab, octopus, lobster, moray eel, parrotfish, angelfish, sergeant major, barracuda, Florida horse conch, and queen conch. Many of the same species that can be found throughout the rest of the Keys are also found here, and even species from the greater Caribbean.

Other species of marine life have also been spotted at the reef, ranging from infrequently to even only a few times. Rarer species include permit, tarpon, spotted eagle ray, sea turtles, and the Atlantic Goliath grouper.

== See also ==
- Rock Key
