= Rock Key =

Coral reef

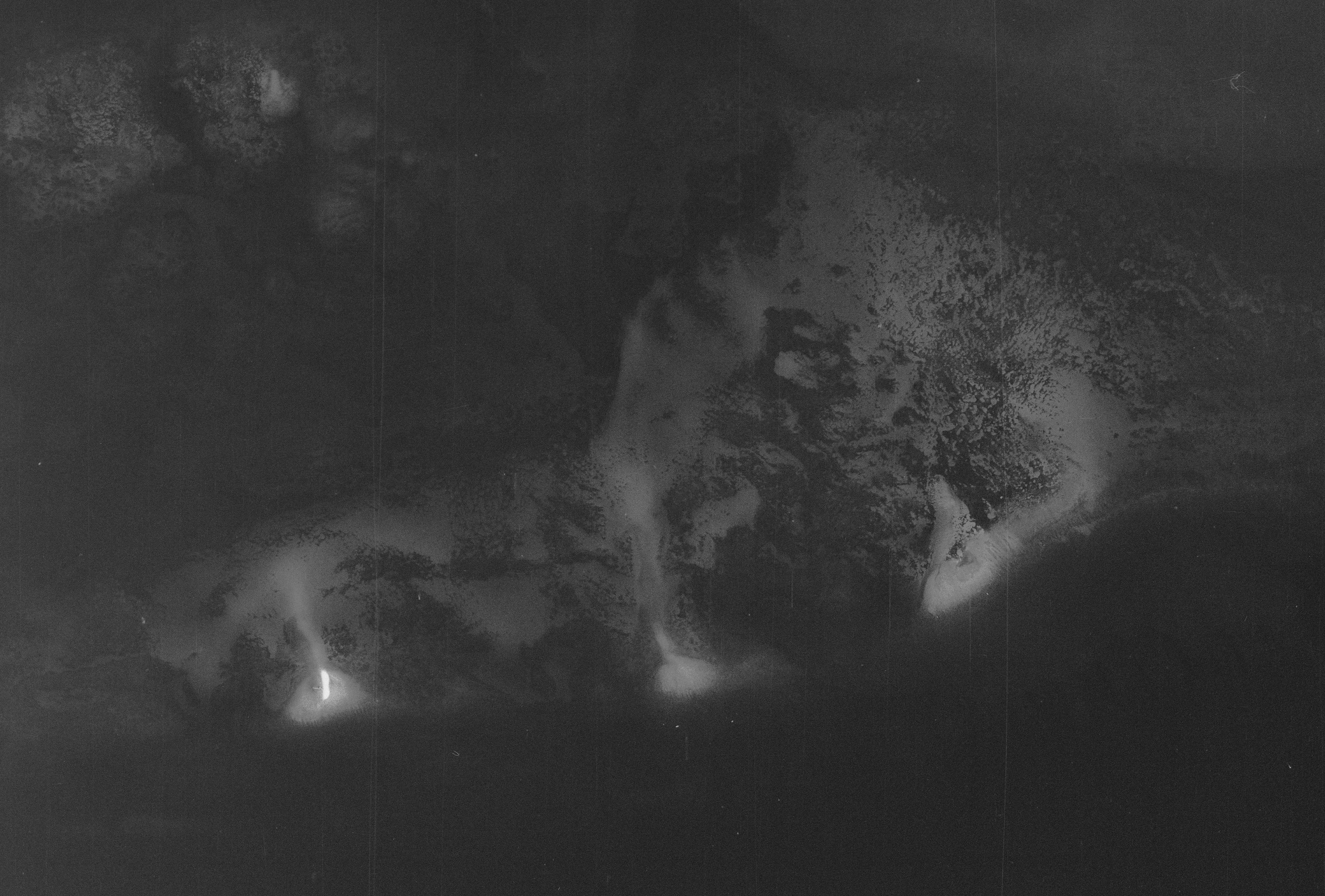
- Air photo taken in 1970 showing Sand Key (lower left), Rock Key (lower center), and Eastern Dry Rocks (lower right).

- Location within Florida Location within the Caribbean
- Summit depth: 1 - 35 feet

Location
- Location: Caribbean
- Coordinates: 24°27′18″N 81°51′30″W
- Country: United States

Geology
- Type: reef

Rock Key is a coral reef located within the Florida Keys National Marine Sanctuary. It lies to the southwest of Key West, within the Key West National Wildlife Refuge. This reef is within a Sanctuary Preservation Area (SPA).

== See also ==
- Sand Key
- Eastern Dry Rocks
