= Molasses Keys =

Group of islands in the Florida Keys

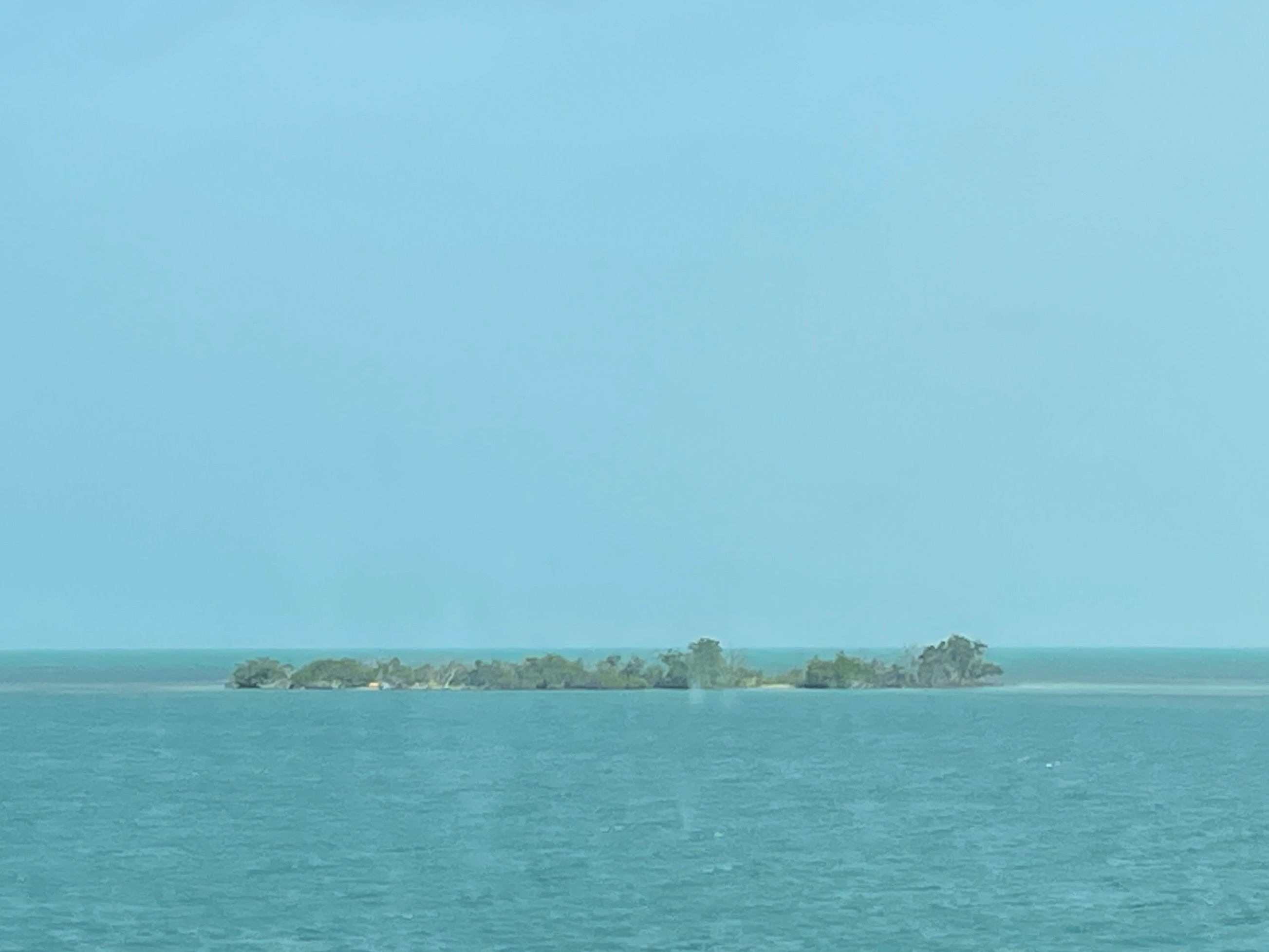
- Largest island as seen from the Seven Miles Bridge

- Molasses Keys Molasses Keys (the Caribbean)

Geography
- Location: Gulf of Mexico
- Coordinates: 24°41′07.5″N 81°11′19.8″W
- Archipelago: Florida Keys
- Adjacent to: Florida Straits

Administration
- United States
- State: Florida
- County: Monroe

The Molasses Keys are a small group of islands in the Florida Keys. Located a quarter mile south of the Seven Mile Bridge, 4 miles west of Marathon, and a mile and a half east of Money Key, The Molasses Keys are a frequented boating and camping spot.

== Geography ==
There are four islands, three of which are always above water and two of which are able to be walked on. The largest and easternmost one is 90% full of vegetation, while the second largest one just southwest has more of a beach. The third one is an area of rocks always above water just west of the second island. The fourth is an outcropping of rocks and sand visible at low tide just south of the largest island. There is a shallow grass and rock bed to the south of the islands.

In the middle of the two main islands, there is a deep narrow channel. The north end has a sandbar about 500 feet (150 m) to the north. Also between the second and third island there is an access point which is a deep channel.

== Current situation ==
The islands are frequented by boaters, campers, and fishermen because of the sandbars and Seven Mile Bridge channel.
