= Little Mullet Key =

Island in Monroe County, Florida, US

- Little Mullet Key Little Mullet Key (the Caribbean)

Geography
- Location: Gulf of Mexico
- Coordinates: 24.581611°N 81.950528°W
- Archipelago: Florida Keys
- Adjacent to: Florida Straits

Administration
- United States
- State: Florida
- County: Monroe

Little Mullet Key is an island in the Florida Keys in Monroe County, Florida, United States. It is within the boundaries of the Key West National Wildlife Refuge.

Located in the Outlying Islands of the Florida Keys, it is in the northern Mule Keys that are 9 miles (15 km) west of Key West.
