= Mule Keys =

Archipelago in Monroe County, Florida, U.S.

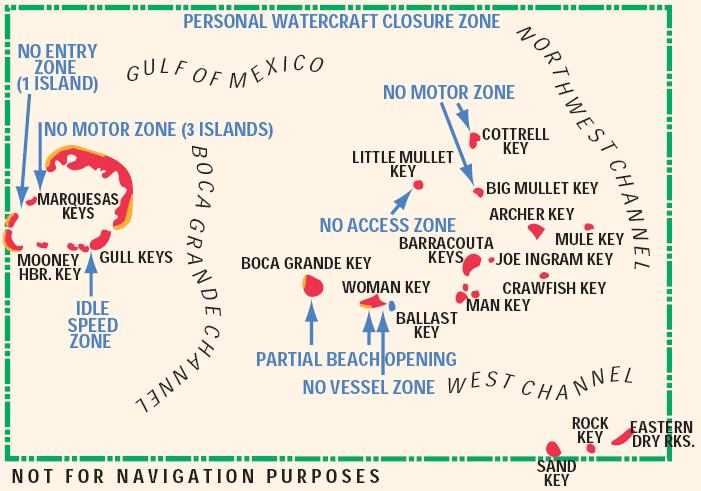
The location of Barracouta Keys and Marquesas Keys in the Key West National Wildlife Refuge.

The Mule Keys are a group of scattered islets in the Florida Keys in Monroe County, Florida, United States. They are between 3 and 12 miles (4.8 and 19.3 km) west of Key West, separated from it by the Northwest Channel. On the west, they are separated from the Marquesas Keys by the 6-mile (9.7 km) wide Boca Grande Channel. They belong to the outlying islands of the Florida Keys. Administratively, they are an unincorporated area of Monroe County. The islets are part of the Key West National Wildlife Refuge. The area of the islets totals 1.07 mi^{2} (2.8 km^{2}), of which 1.02 mi^{2} (2.6 km^{2}) are land area and 0.05 mi^{2} (0.13 km^{2}) inland water bodies (on three of the keys). The islets are uninhabited except for Mule Key, for which the census of 2000 lists one housing unit with a population of two (park rangers or coast guard).

The United States Government has placed most of this area off limits, as a part of the Key West National Wildlife Refuge. It is even prohibited to anchor off Man Key and Woman Key in the sand, although Woman Key was a popular destination for day trippers from Key West in the past, which Boca Grande Key still is. Anchoring off the south part of Boca Grande Key is also prohibited; it is permitted only off the northwest portion.

Ballast Key was privately owned by Key West developer David W. Wolkowsky. After Wolkowsky's death in 2018, the island was donated to The Nature Conservancy, which in turn deeded ownership of the land to the United States Fish and Wildlife Service.

The easternmost islet, Mule Key, is 2.7 miles (4.3 km) west of Sunset Key which is part of Key West city. The westernmost (and largest) islet, Boca Grande Key, is 6 miles (10 km) east of the Marquesas Keys.

12 individual islets are named on detailed topographical maps:

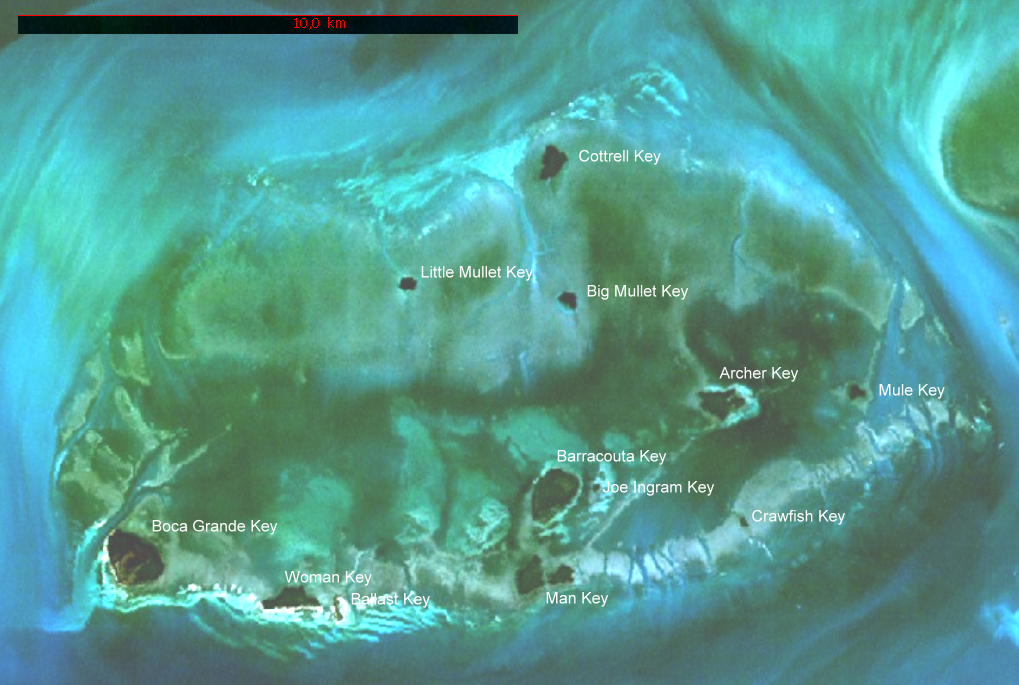
Block Nr.^{1)}	Islet	Land Area (m^{2})	Inland Waters (m^{2})	Total Area (m^{2})	Coordinates	Comment
3031	Mule Key	52169	-	52169	24°33′43.2″N 81°51′42.4″W	easternmost
3032	Archer Key	247136	-	247136	24°33′43.2″N 81°53′23.3″W	actually two separate islets
3033	Crawfish Key	17125	-	17125	24°32′19.4″N 81°53′01.6″W
3034	Barracouta Key^{2)}	482627	57221	539848	24°32′38.5″N 81°55′17.5″W	including tiny islet 430 m south
3034	Joe Ingram Key^{2)}	482627	-	539848	24°32′43.9″N 81°54′45.4″W	smallest
3035	Man Key	358808	-	358808	24°31′40.3″N 81°55′38.5″W	actually three separate islets
3036	Ballast Key	46801	4741	51542	24°31′23.0″N 81°57′51.1″W	southernmost
3037	Woman Key	317669	-	317669	24°31′27.6″N 81°58′25.4″W
3038	Boca Grande Key	741228	80416	821644	24°32′04.4″N 82°00′18.3″W	largest, westernmost
3039	Little Mullet Key	58625	-	58625	24°34′53.8″N 81°57′01.9″W
3040	Big Mullet Key	87211	-	87211	24°34′44.5″N 81°55′08.0″W
3041	Cottrell Key	215943	-	215943	24°36′12.9″N 81°55′17.7″W	northernmost
	Mule Keys	2625342	142378	2767720
^{1)}of Block Group 3, Census tract 9725, Monroe County, Florida^{2)} Because Barracouta Key and Joe Ingram Key together form one census block, no exact separate area figures are available. Joe Ingram Key is estimated at 10,000 m^{2}.

On nautical maps, the Mule Keys appear like an atoll of 11 miles (18 km) length east–west, and 6 miles (9.7 km) width north–south (covering a sea area of roughly 58 mi^{2} (150 km^{2}), with Mule Key, Crawfish Key, Man Key, Ballast Key, Woman Key and Boca Grande Key along the southern rim (from east to west), and Cottrell Key in the north.

7 miles (11 km) south of Mule Key, separated from the Mule Keys by West Channel, are three notable submerged reefs, from east to west:

1. Eastern Dry Rocks, at 24°27′42.6″N 81°50′38.1″W
2. Rock Key, at 24°27′21.3″N 81°51′26.3″W
3. Sand Key, at 24°27′18.3″N 81°52′37.5″W
