= Cottrell Key =

Island in the Florida Keys in the United States

- Cottrell Key Cottrell Key (the Caribbean)

Geography
- Location: Gulf of Mexico
- Coordinates: 24.603583°N 81.921583°W
- Archipelago: Florida Keys
- Adjacent to: Florida Straits

Administration
- United States
- State: Florida
- County: Monroe

Cottrell Key is an island in the Florida Keys in Monroe County, Florida, United States. It is within the boundaries of the Key West National Wildlife Refuge.

Located in the Outlying Islands of the Florida Keys, it is the northernmost of the Mule Keys that are 9 miles (15 km) west of Key West.

It is named for Captain Jeremiah Cottrell, who was the captain of a lightship that was anchored at the key in the early 19th century.
