= Joe Ingram Key =

Island in Monroe County, Florida, United States

- Joe Ingram Key Joe Ingram Key (the Caribbean)

Geography
- Location: Gulf of Mexico
- Coordinates: 24.545528°N 81.912611°W

Administration
- United States
- State: Florida
- County: Monroe

Joe Ingram Key is an island in the Florida Keys in Monroe County, Florida, United States. It is within the boundaries of the Key West National Wildlife Refuge.

Located in the Outlying Islands of the Florida Keys, it is in the southern Mule Keys that are 9 miles (15 km) west of Key West.

It is the smallest of the Mule Keys. The key was named after former U.S service member Joseph Ingram following the 2004 midnight rescue of four fisherman adrift south of the key.
