= Curry Hammock State Park =

State park in Florida, United States

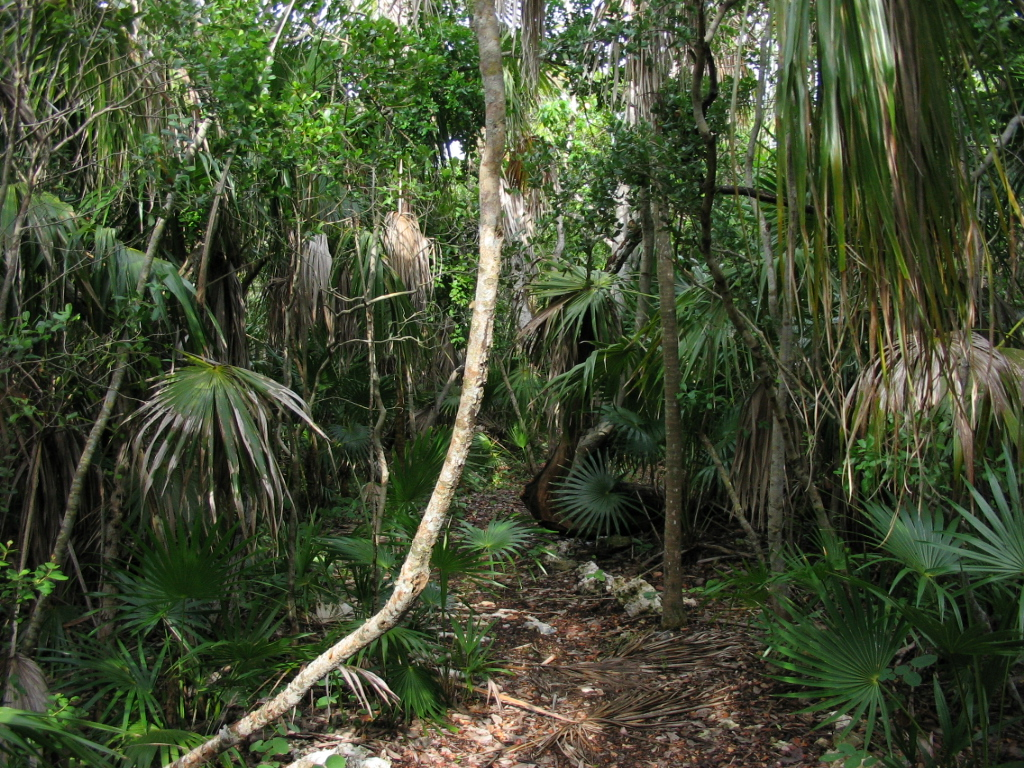
- Dense vegetation in the park

- Location within Florida Location within the United States
- Interactive map of Curry Hammock State Park
- Location: Monroe County, Florida, USA
- Nearest city: Marathon, Florida
- Coordinates: 24°44′33″N 80°59′5″W
- Established: 1991
- Governing body: Florida Department of Environmental Protection

Curry Hammock State Park is a Florida State Park, located along both sides of US 1, starting at mile marker 56.2 on Crawl Key in the Florida Keys.

The park protects mangrove swamps, rockland hammocks, and seagrass beds that provide habitat for resident and migratory wildlife.

== Activities ==
There are many activities available at Curry Hammock State Park. Kayaking, Fishing, and general beach going. You can also camp and bring your RV to the park to stay the night. Check in at the ranger station for more information.

== Climate ==
Curry Hammock State Park has a tropical savanna climate (Aw).

Climate data for Curry Hammock State Park, Florida, (1991–2020 normals, extremes 2003–present)
Month	Jan	Feb	Mar	Apr	May	Jun	Jul	Aug	Sep	Oct	Nov	Dec	Year
Record high °F (°C)	86 (30)	87 (31)	88 (31)	92 (33)	93 (34)	95 (35)	97 (36)	96 (36)	97 (36)	94 (34)	91 (33)	89 (32)	97 (36)
Mean maximum °F (°C)	83.0 (28.3)	83.2 (28.4)	84.7 (29.3)	87.9 (31.1)	89.8 (32.1)	91.9 (33.3)	93.8 (34.3)	93.8 (34.3)	92.4 (33.6)	90.9 (32.7)	86.9 (30.5)	84.6 (29.2)	94.8 (34.9)
Mean daily maximum °F (°C)	76.1 (24.5)	77.8 (25.4)	79.8 (26.6)	82.9 (28.3)	85.9 (29.9)	88.5 (31.4)	90.3 (32.4)	90.4 (32.4)	89.3 (31.8)	86.2 (30.1)	81.7 (27.6)	78.4 (25.8)	83.9 (28.8)
Daily mean °F (°C)	69.3 (20.7)	70.7 (21.5)	73.1 (22.8)	76.8 (24.9)	80.0 (26.7)	83.1 (28.4)	84.6 (29.2)	84.7 (29.3)	83.3 (28.5)	80.5 (26.9)	75.5 (24.2)	72.1 (22.3)	77.8 (25.5)
Mean daily minimum °F (°C)	62.4 (16.9)	63.7 (17.6)	66.4 (19.1)	70.8 (21.6)	74.1 (23.4)	77.4 (25.2)	78.9 (26.1)	79.0 (26.1)	77.3 (25.2)	74.9 (23.8)	69.2 (20.7)	65.8 (18.8)	71.7 (22.1)
Mean minimum °F (°C)	48.4 (9.1)	52.4 (11.3)	56.9 (13.8)	61.2 (16.2)	67.9 (19.9)	72.4 (22.4)	73.4 (23.0)	73.6 (23.1)	73.6 (23.1)	66.9 (19.4)	59.2 (15.1)	53.3 (11.8)	46.5 (8.1)
Record low °F (°C)	37 (3)	43 (6)	48 (9)	54 (12)	62 (17)	70 (21)	70 (21)	69 (21)	70 (21)	57 (14)	50 (10)	42 (6)	37 (3)
Average precipitation inches (mm)	1.79 (45)	1.79 (45)	1.64 (42)	2.47 (63)	3.47 (88)	5.00 (127)	4.17 (106)	7.27 (185)	6.87 (174)	7.05 (179)	2.44 (62)	2.03 (52)	45.99 (1,168)
Average precipitation days (≥ 0.01 in)	6.3	5.5	4.8	4.6	6.3	9.1	11.4	13.3	14.9	12.1	6.4	6.8	101.5
Source: NOAA

== Gallery ==
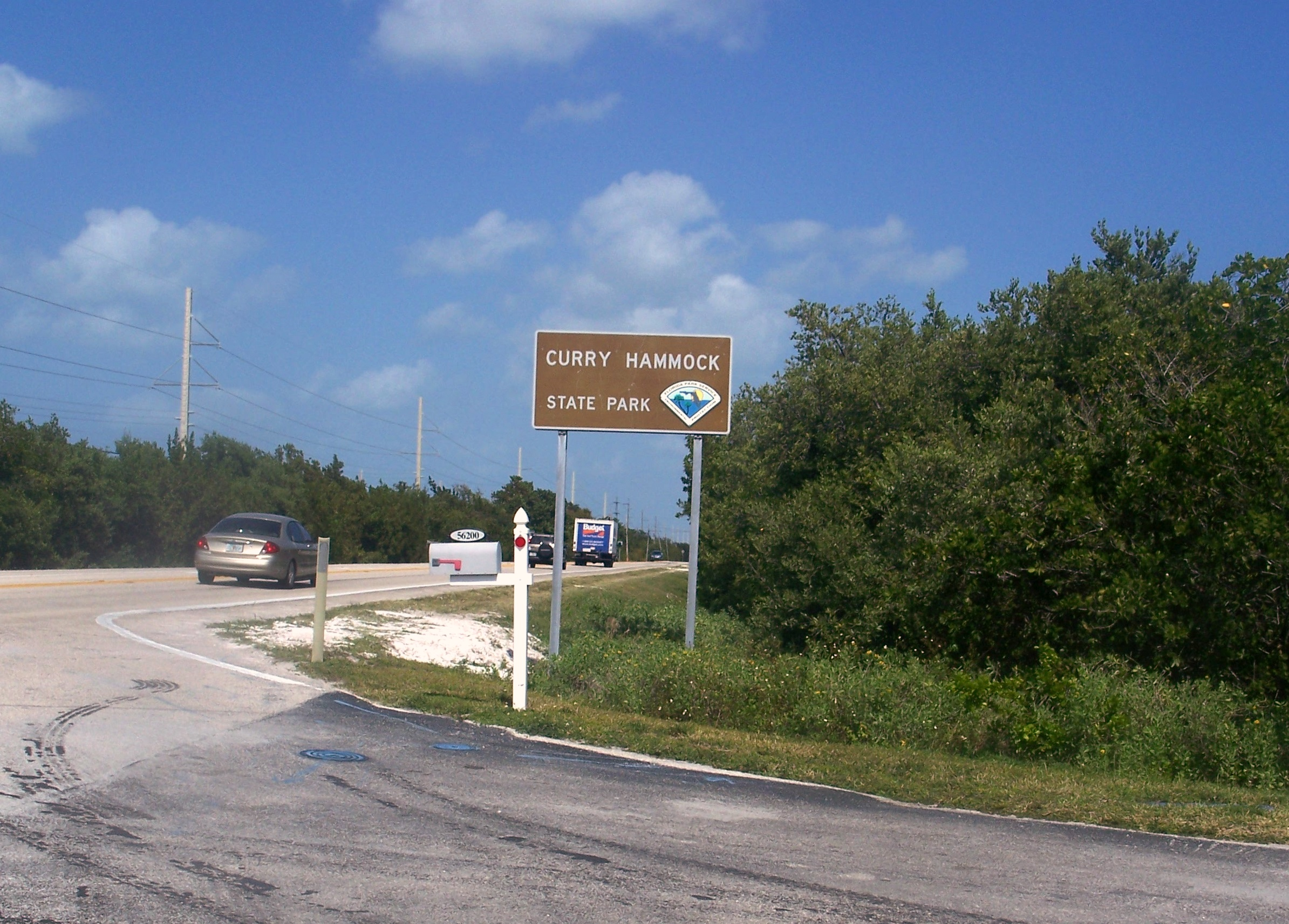
Sign

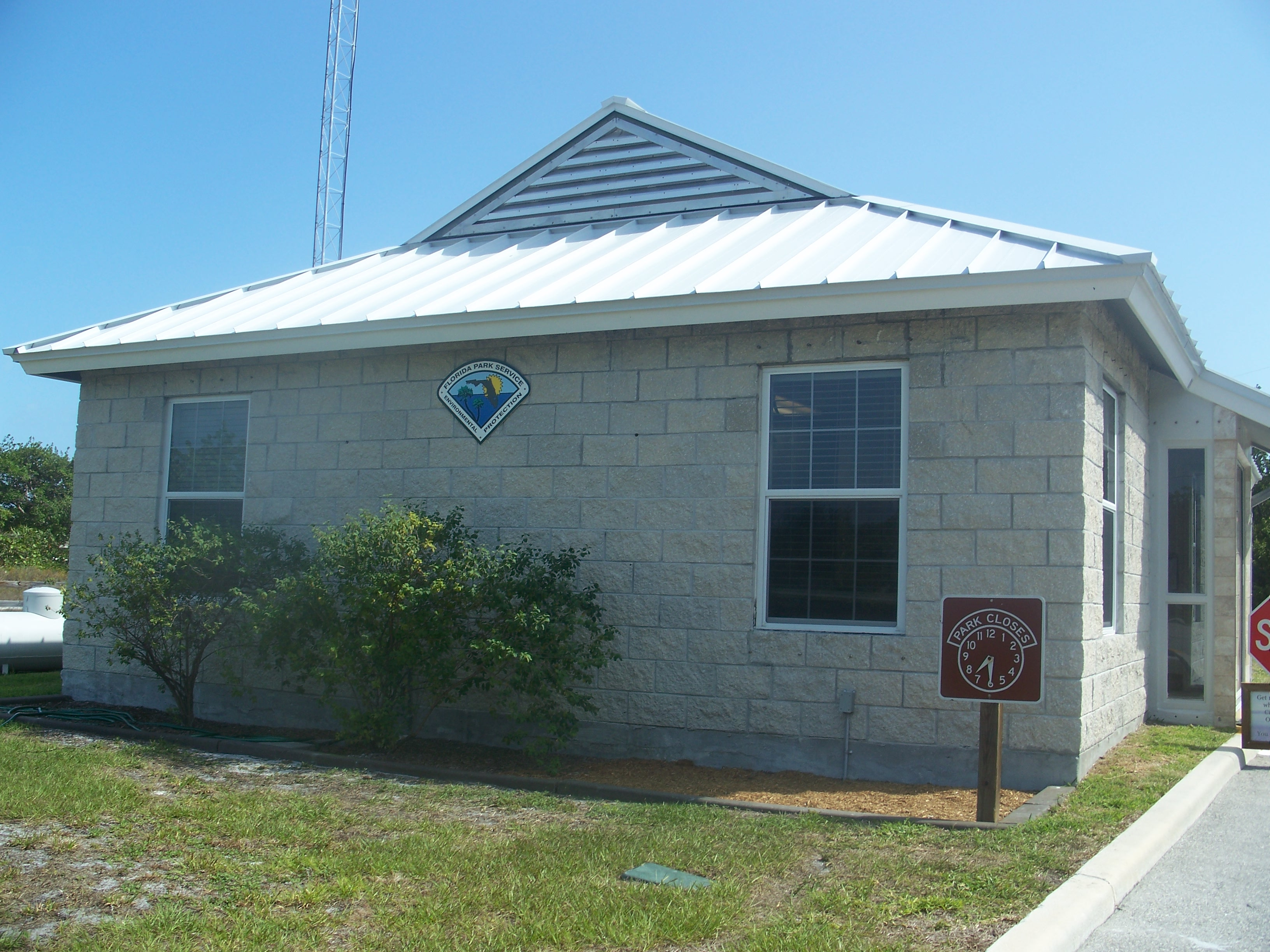
Ranger station

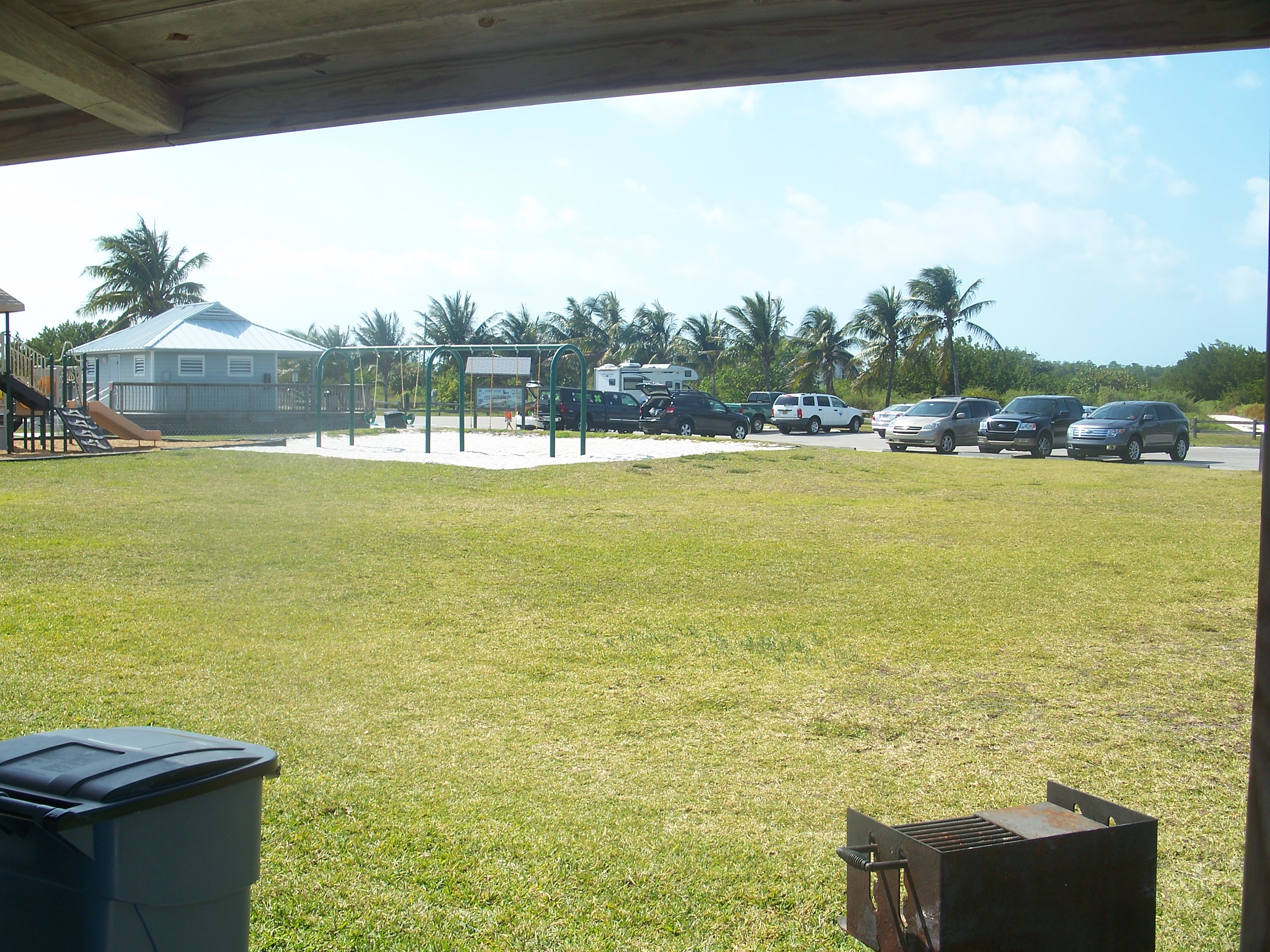
Parking area

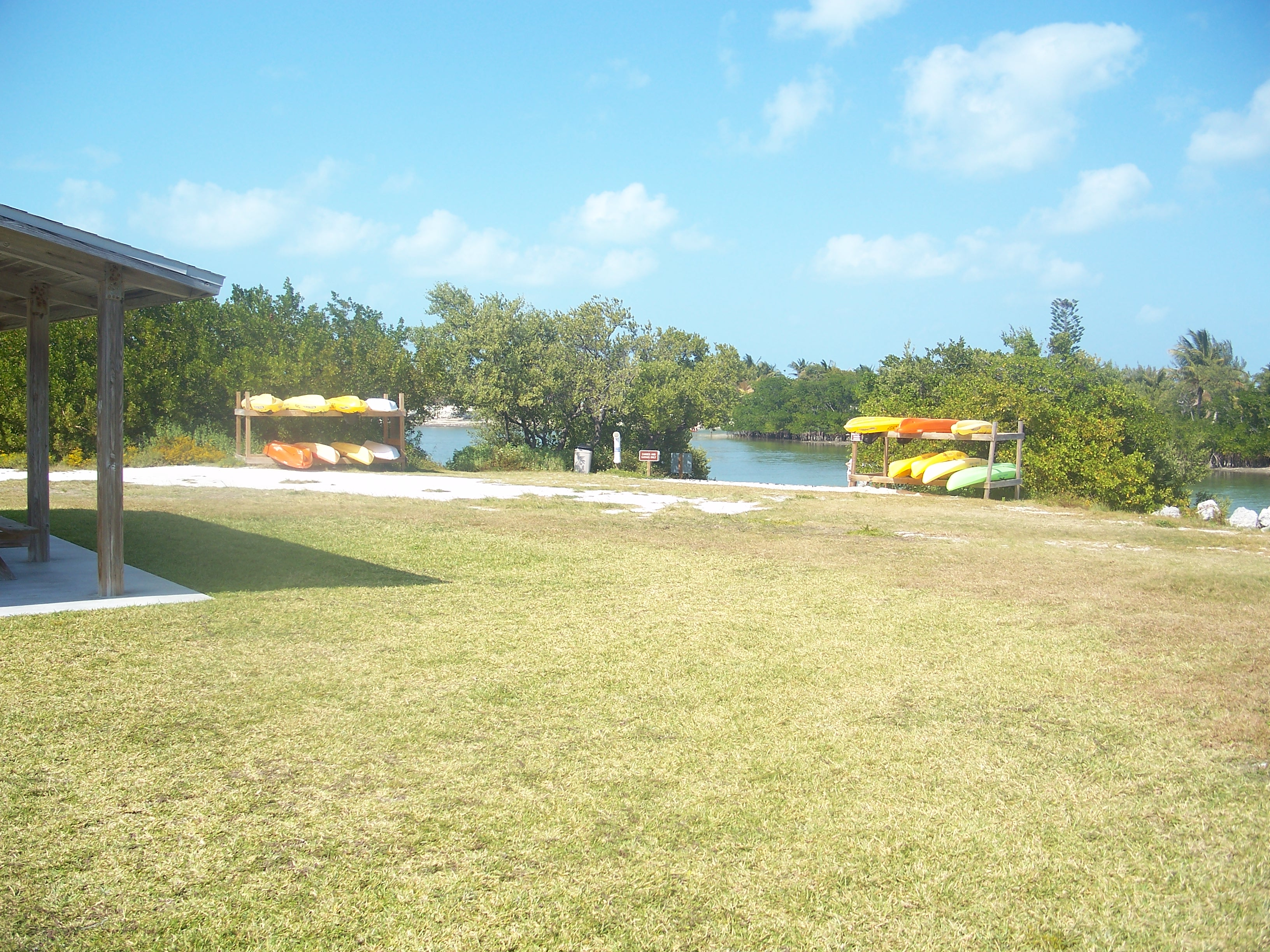
Kayak launch

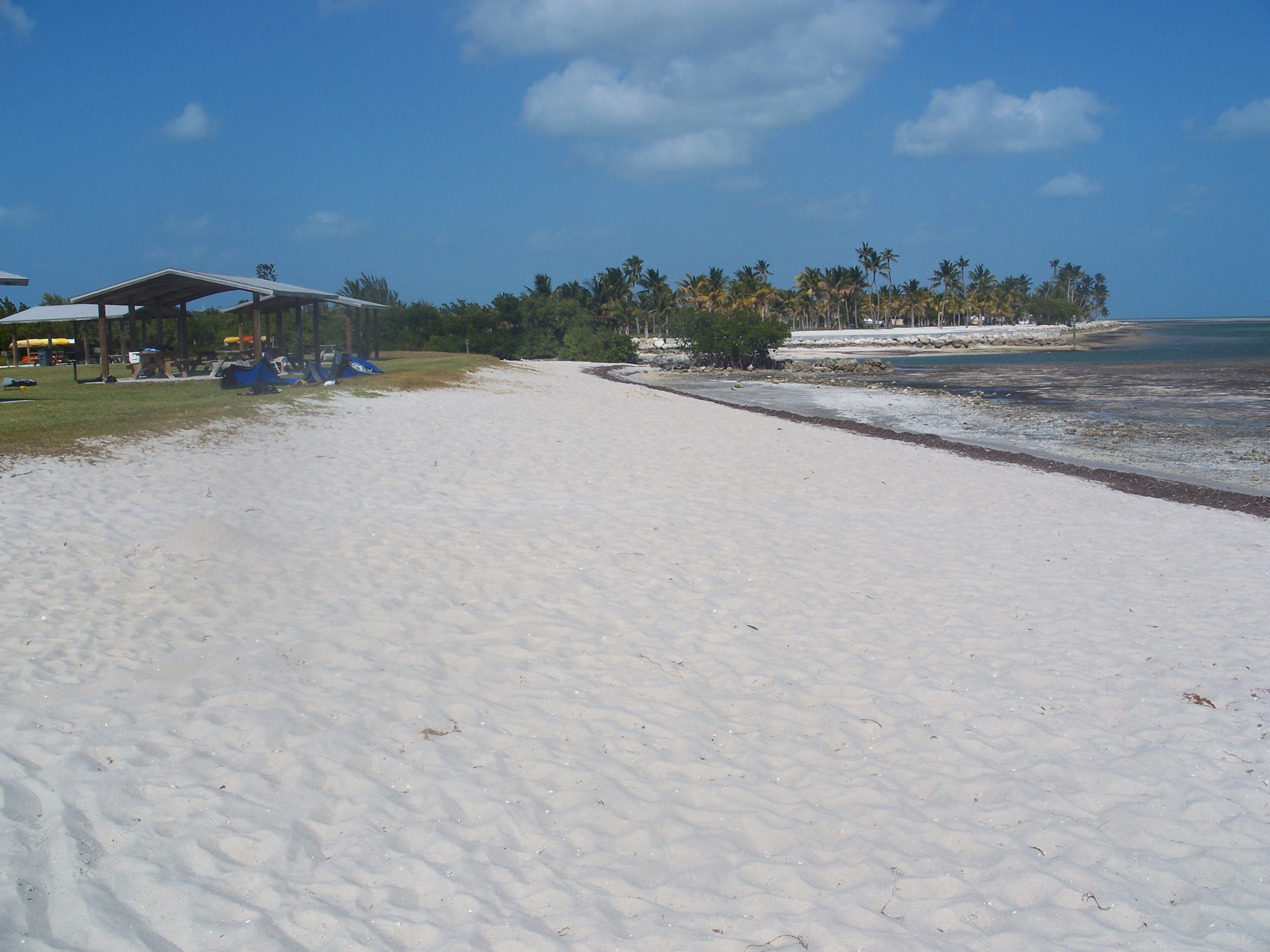
Beachfront pavilion and shoreline

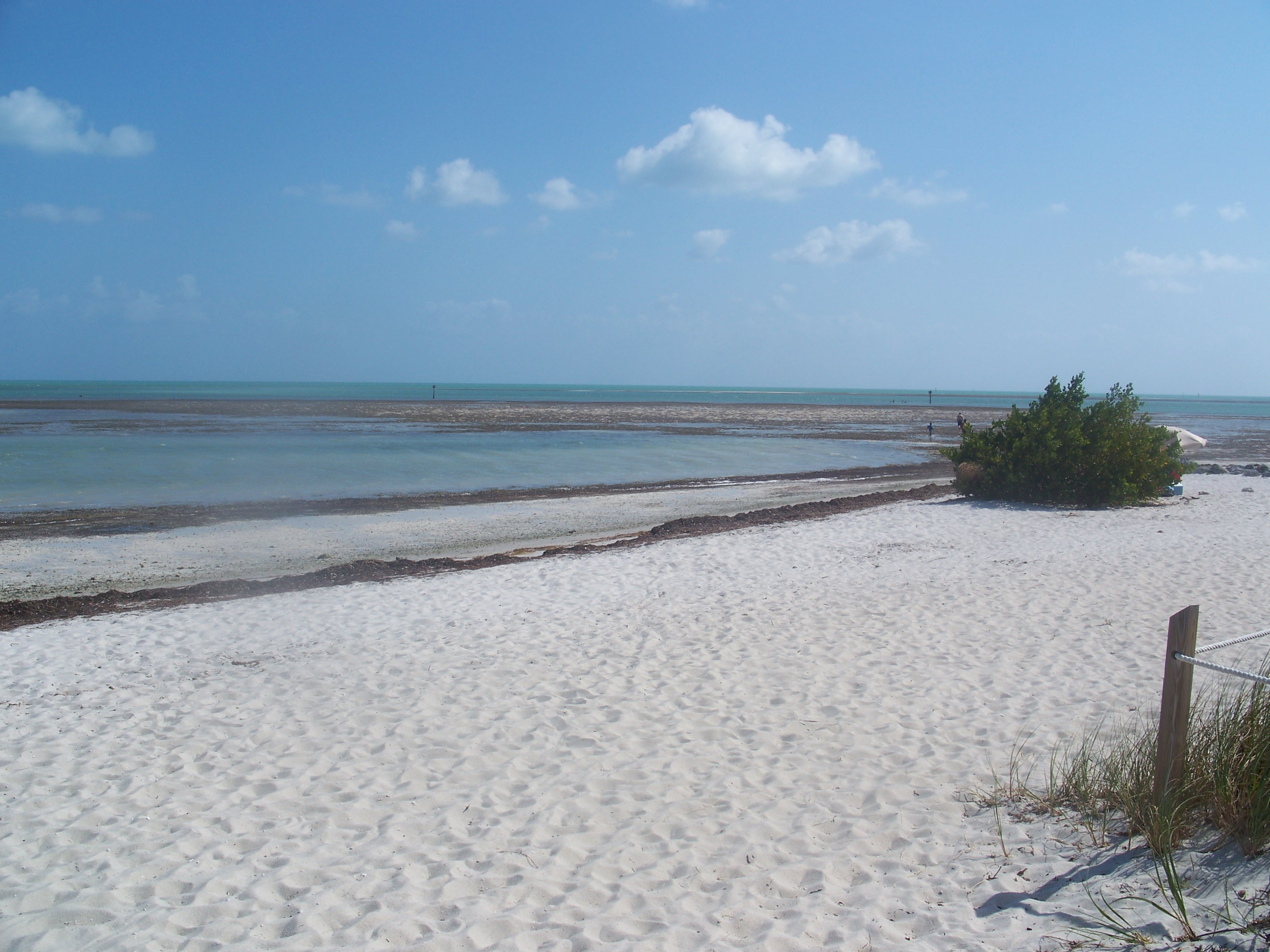
View of the beach
