= Boca Grande Key =

Island in the Florida Keys, United States

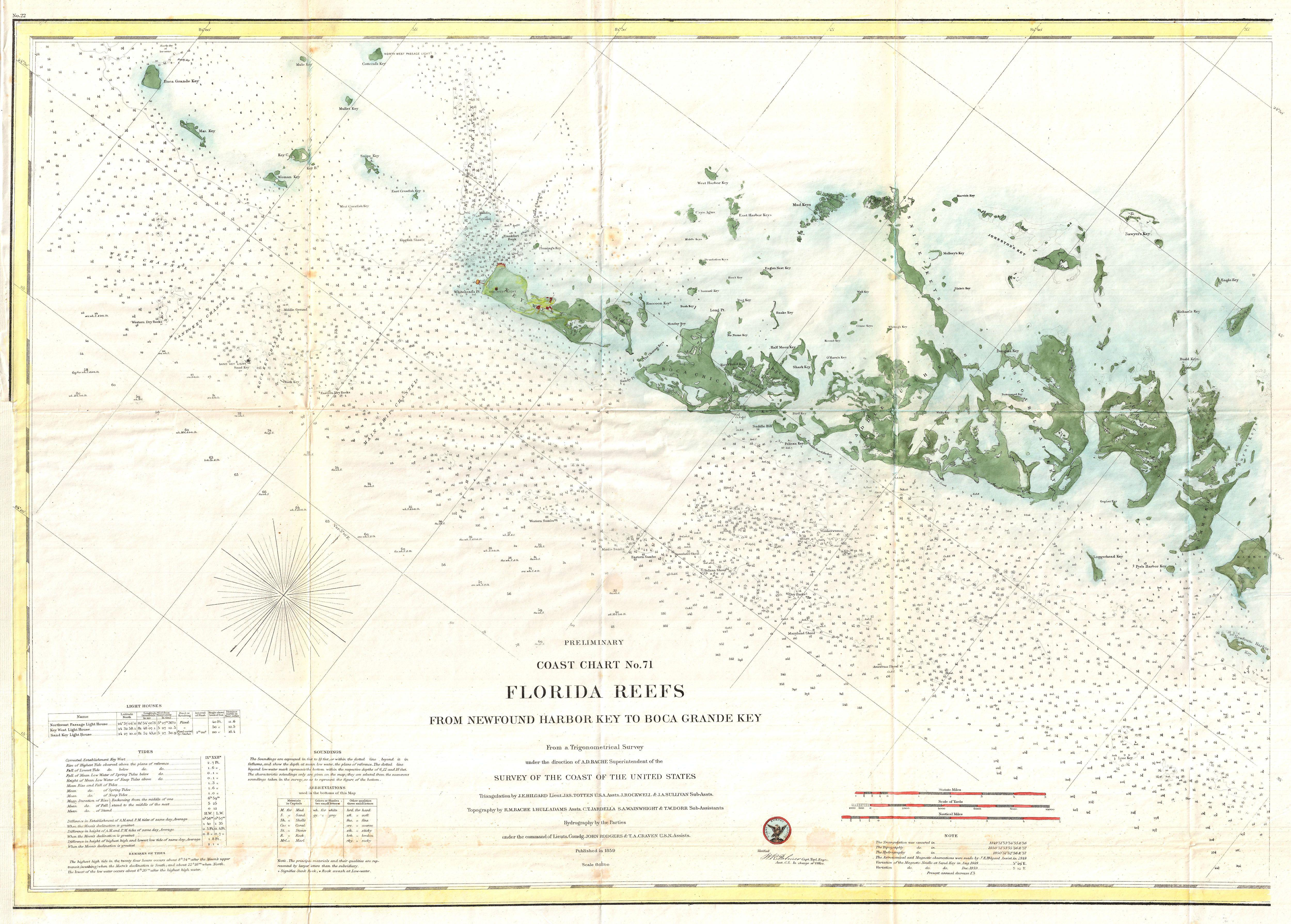
- 1859 U.S. Coast Survey Map or Nautical Chart of the Florida Keys and Key West with Boca Grande Key

- Boca Grande Key Boca Grande Key (the Caribbean)

Geography
- Location: Gulf of Mexico
- Coordinates: 24.534556°N 82.005083°W
- Archipelago: Florida Keys
- Adjacent to: Florida Straits

Administration
- United States
- State: Florida
- County: Monroe

Boca Grande Key is an island in the Florida Keys in Monroe County, Florida, United States. The island lies within the boundaries of the Key West National Wildlife Refuge. It is 183 acres (74 ha) in size.

Located in the Outlying Islands of the Florida Keys, it is the largest and westernmost of the Mule Keys that are 14 miles (23 km) west of Key West. As a refuge site, some of its beach and forest regions are closed of for nature preservation and carries many endangered species of birds, many of which observed were hawks, plovers, and other waders.
