= Archer Key =

Island in the Florida Keys, United States

- Archer Key Archer Key (the Caribbean)

Geography
- Location: Gulf of Mexico
- Coordinates: 24.562°N 81.889806°W

Administration
- United States
- State: Florida
- County: Monroe

Archer Key is an island in the Florida Keys in Monroe County, Florida, United States. It is within the boundaries of the Key West National Wildlife Refuge.

Located in the Outlying Islands of the Florida Keys, it is in the eastern Mule Keys that are 9 miles (15 km) west of Key West.

It is composed of two separate islets. Northern anchorage is approximate 7.5 ft(2meters at high tide) Angeline Anchorage, as well Anchorage Mary to the west, and shallow water Anchorage Jenny V to the east.
