= DLD (band) =

Mexican alternative rock band

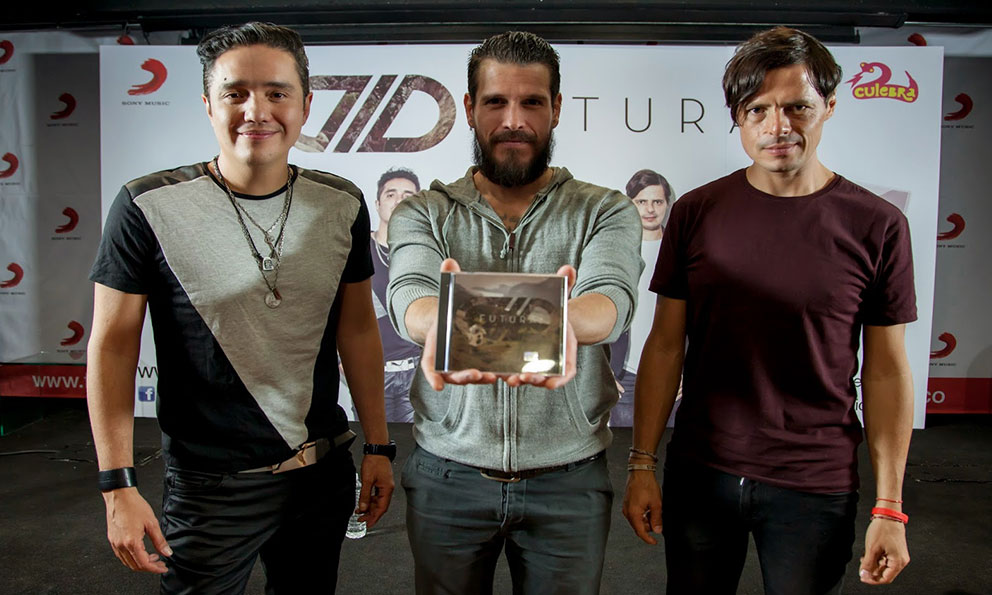

Background information
- Origin: Naucalpan, State of Mexico, Mexico
- Genres: Latin alternative; Alternative rock; Indie rock; Pop rock
- Years active: 1998–present
- Label: Sony Music Mexico
- Members: Francisco Familiar; Edgar "Pijey" Hansen Otero; Erik Neville Linares; Gil Santiago Rangel; Sergio Vela
- Past members: Rodrigo Vieyra; Arturo Rojas †; Eugenio "Keno" Rivero
- Website: https://www.dld.com.mx/

DLD, formerly Dildo, is a Mexican alternative rock band from the State of Mexico, formed in November 1998. The band is composed of Francisco Familiar (vocals), Erik Neville Linares (guitar), Edgar "Pijey" Hansen Otero (bass), Gil Santiago Rangel (drums), and Sergio Vela (keyboards).

DLD's sound is characterized by a fusion of alternative rock elements with influences from pop punk and American rock, especially present in their early work. The band has released eight studio albums and three live albums. In 2012, they gained greater exposure with their fifth studio album, Primario, which was nominated for two Latin Grammy Awards in 2013: Best Pop/Rock Album and Best Rock Song for the single "Todo Cuenta". The album also received Gold certification in Mexico for surpassing 30,000 units sold.

DLD has participated in multiple editions of the Vive Latino Festival and has performed in some of the most important venues in the country, such as the Auditorio Nacional and the Palacio de los Deportes. Their consistent presence at festivals and large-scale venues has solidified their reputation as one of the most representative bands of contemporary Mexican rock.

== Career ==
=== 1998–2004: Formation and Self-Titled Album ===
The band was formed when Francisco Familiar and "Pijey" met at a bar in Ciudad Satélite called Urania. With a desire to experiment and evolve, the band was officially formed on November 12, 1998. However, it wasn't until 2002 that they caught the attention of the specialized media and the music industry, after winning 2nd place in the "Rastreo de Bandas 2003" contest, organized by the now-defunct radio station Órbita 105.7 FM (now Reactor 105.7 FM) in Mexico City.

Their inspirations include Café Tacvba, Los Lagartos, and La Concepción de la Luna, cult bands also from Ciudad Satélite that were regularly played on that station. Originally called Dildo, the band caught the attention of several record labels and eventually signed their first contract with an independent rock label in Mexico. At the time, the band was a four-piece: Francisco Familiar (vocals), Edgar "Pijey" (bass), Erik Neville (guitar), and Rodrigo Vieyra (drums).

Their self-titled debut album, released in 2003, was well received by both audiences and the press. They began touring throughout Mexico and shared the stage with some of the most popular Spanish-speaking rock bands. Four singles were released from this album: "Noches de Vinil", "Pagarás", "Dixie", and "Loco Corazón", each with its own music video. These songs are now considered classics by the band’s fans.

=== 2005–2006: Modjo ===
In 2005, they released their second album, which included five new original songs and nine live versions of tracks from their debut album, along with the music videos they had up to that point. For the first time, the band performed outside of Mexico, with a tour of over fourteen dates across the United States, including a headlining show at The Roxy Theatre in Los Angeles, California.

They also took part in the 2005 edition of Rock al Parque in Colombia, where only three Mexican bands were featured on the main lineup: Jaguares, Nortec, and DLD. That same year, they performed for the second time at the Vive Latino festival, which drew over 20,000 attendees.

=== 2006–2011: Ventura and Por Encima ===
During this period, the band decided to shorten their name from "Dildo" to DLD. In 2007, they released their third studio album, Ventura. It was produced by René Lugo in collaboration with the band. The singles were "Un vicio caro es el amor", "Ventura", and "Suicidio #3".

In September 2009, they released the album Por Encima, which they presented live with a sold-out show at Salón 21 (now José Cuervo Salón) in Mexico City. This fourth studio album features an intro and 12 original tracks. The singles included "Se va", "La llamada", "1° de octubre", and "Por Siempre".

=== 2012-2014: Primario ===
In 2012, the band signed with Sony Music and began working on their fifth studio album, Primario, produced by Armando Ávila and mixed by Chris Lord-Alge. The album features 12 original songs and four singles: "Arsénico", "Todo Cuenta", "Viernes", and "Sea". On that same year, they released a live album from the performance titled DLD – En vivo desde el Auditorio Nacional.

In 2013 the band received its first nominations from the Latin Recording Academy: Best Rock Song for the single "Todo Cuenta" and Best Pop/Rock Album for Primario. In November of that year, the band was honored at the Premios Telehit, winning the award for Best Rock Album in Spanish.

=== 2015-2019: Futura ===
Their sixth studio album was titled Futura, conceived at the Hard Rock Hotel in Cancún, in the Riviera Maya, and recorded at Cosmo Producciones studios in the State of Mexico. This album was also produced by Armando Ávila. The album contains 11 original tracks and was released in March 2015. The album ranked among the best-selling albums at Mixup, a major Mexican music retailer.

In August of the same year, the band performed a sold-out concert at the Palacio de los Deportes in Mexico City, filling the venue's full capacity of 18,000 people. At the sixteenth edition of the Vive Latino Festival, the band made another appearance, marking their eighth participation since 2004. To close the promotional tour for Futura, they performed a final concert at El Plaza Condesa, which was also sold out and featured several guest artists.

=== 2020-2022: Transcender ===
Transcender, their seventh studio album, was released in 2020. It was recorded at Cosmo Producciones studios in the State of Mexico and also produced by Armando Ávila.

The band held three free concerts in one day across Mexico City and the State of Mexico. The first show took place outside the Insurgentes Metro Station (Line 1) in Mexico City. Right after, the band moved to the Faculty of Chemistry at the National Autonomous University of Mexico (UNAM). They closed the day with a final performance at Parque Naucalli. In 2020, DLD performed at the Vive Latino Ibero-American Music Festival. They were one of the headlining acts of that edition.

== Discography ==
- Dildo (2003)
- Modjo (2005)
- Ventura (2007)
- Por encima (2009)
- Primario (2012)
- Futura (2015)
- Transcender (2020)
- Ocho (2023)

== Awards & nominations ==
Year	Award	Category	Nominated work	Result	Ref.
2013	Latin Grammy Awards	Best Pop/Rock Album	Primario	Nominated	
2013	Latin Grammy Awards	Best Rock Song	Todo Cuenta	Nominated	
