= Marquesas Keys =

Island group of the Florida Keys

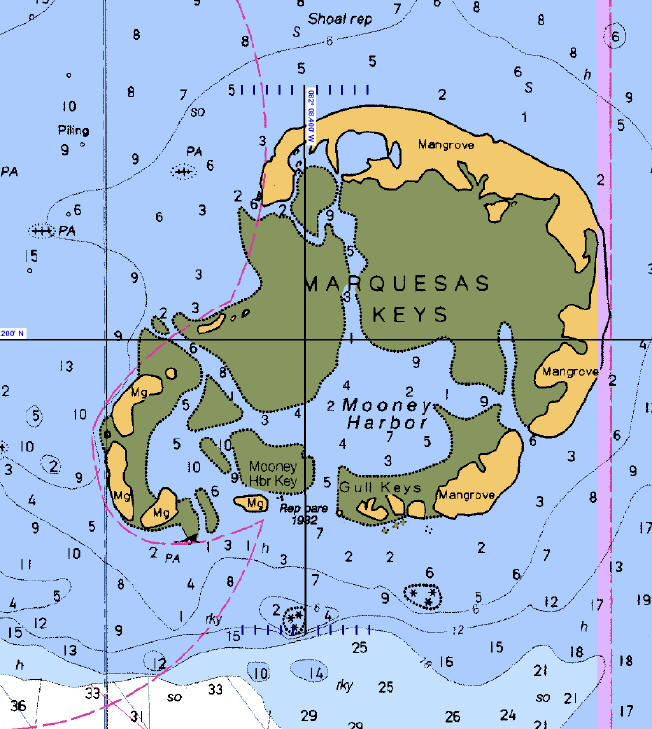
- NOAA Nautical chart of the Marquesas Keys: part of Chart No. 11439 "Sand Key to Rebecca Shoal"
- Interactive map of Marquesas Keys

Geography
- Location: Caribbean
- Coordinates: 24°34′19″N 82°07′10″W
- Archipelago: Florida Keys
- Total islands: 9
- Major islands: Entrance Key
- Area: 6.58 km^{2} (2.54 sq mi)

Administration
- United States
- State: Florida
- County: Monroe County, Florida
- Census County Division: Lower Keys

The Marquesas Keys form an uninhabited island group about 20 miles (32 km) west of Key West, four miles (6 km) in diameter, and largely covered by mangrove forest. They are an unincorporated area of Monroe County, Florida, and belong to the Lower Keys Census County Division. They are protected as part of the Key West National Wildlife Refuge. The Marquesas were used for target practice by the military as recently as 1980.

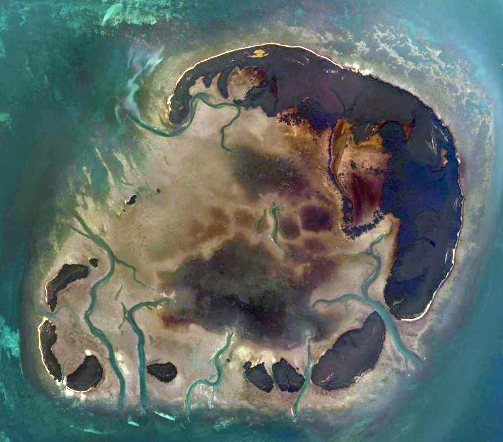
Satellite image of the Marquesas Keys

== Overview ==
The total area, including the lagoon, measures 29.37 km^{2} (11.34 sq mi). The land area, according to the United States Census Bureau, is 6.58 km^{2} (2.54 sq mi) (exactly 6,579,703 m^{2}), the water area 0.17 km^{2} (0.066 sq mi) (165,744 m^{2}), giving a combined area of 6.75 km^{2} (2.61 sq mi), not counting water areas with connection to the open sea, but including small landlocked lakes on the Keys. The group is located at coordinates 24°34′19″N 82°07′10″W.

The islands are part of the Florida Keys, separated from the rest of the Florida Keys, which are farther east, by the Boca Grande Channel, which is 6 miles (9.7 km) wide until Boca Grande Key, the westernmost of the Mule Keys. Only the Dry Tortugas are farther west, 36 miles (58 km) west of the Marquesas Keys.

The central lagoon is called Mooney Harbor. The northernmost key is the largest and has a strip of sandy beach free of mangrove. In the past it was known as "Entrance Key". It surrounds the lagoon in the north and east. Adjoining in the south are smaller keys such as Gull Keys, Mooney Harbor Key, and finally about four unnamed keys in the southwest corner of the group. Older charts show that two of these keys once were named "Button Island" and "Round Island".

Six miles (10 km) west of the Marquesas Keys is Rebecca Shoal.

While the islands are uninhabited by humans, rays, sharks, sea turtles, and bird life abound. The Florida Keys National Marine Sanctuary has designated no-motor and no-access areas to protect nesting, feeding, and roosting birds and nesting turtles.

The islands are also known for sport fishing.

== See also ==
- Key West National Wildlife Refuge
- Pseudo-atoll
