= Wisteria Island =

Island in the Florida Keys

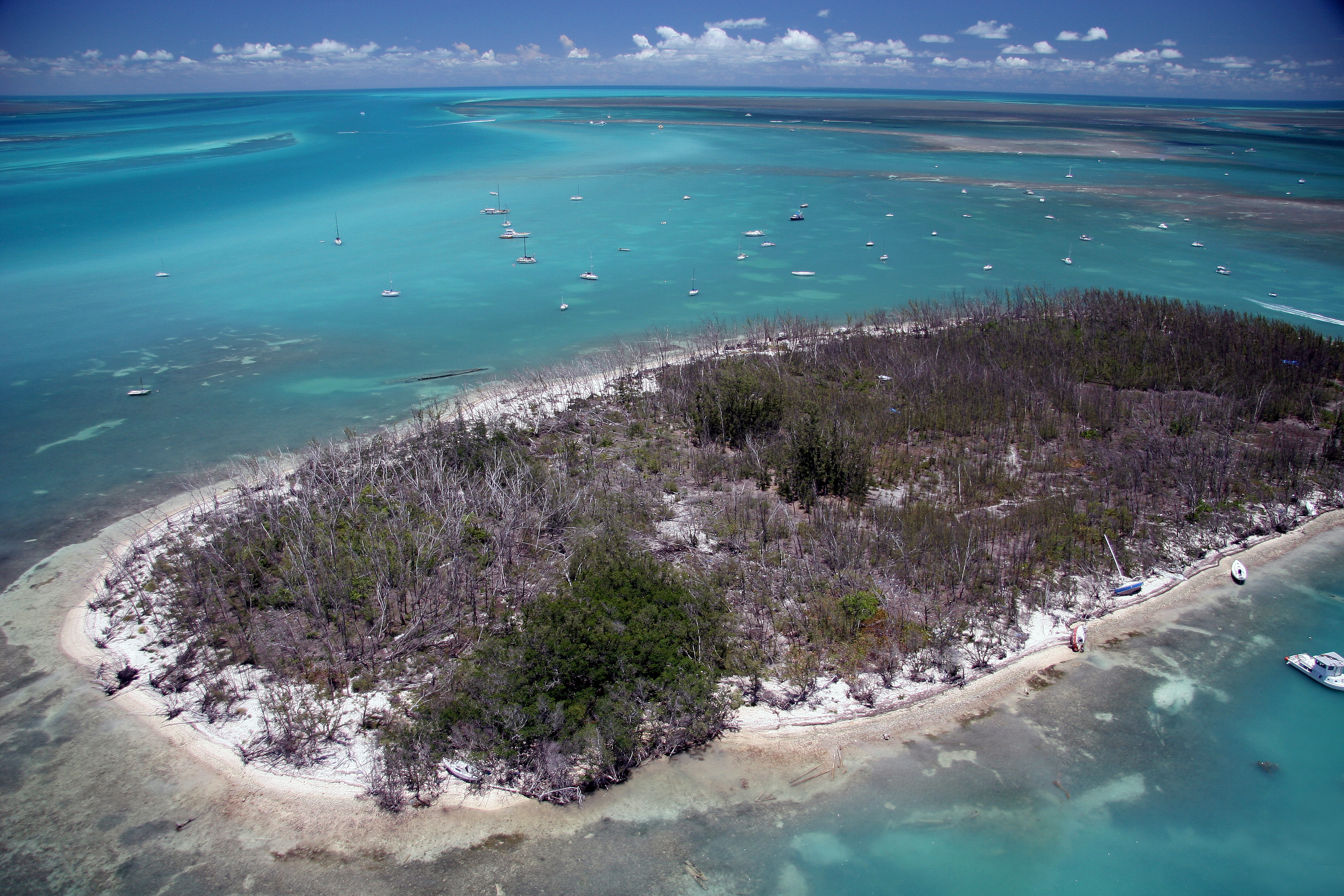
- Wisteria Island in the lower Florida Keys, about 600 yards northwest of Downtown Key West, Florida

- Wisteria Island Wisteria Island (the Caribbean)

Geography
- Location: Gulf of Mexico
- Coordinates: 24.5678°N 81.8108°W

Administration
- United States
- State: Florida
- County: Monroe

Wisteria Island is a federally owned, uninhabited island in the lower Florida Keys 645 yards (590 m) northwest of the northwestern corner of the main island and city of Key West, Florida, Monroe County, United States. It is located 280 yards (260 m) north-northeast of Sunset Key (Tank Island), its closest neighbor.

Wisteria Island's area is 106,346 square meters (10.6346 ha) (26 acres).

== History ==
Wisteria Island was created in the late 1890s and early 1900s as the result of U.S. Navy dredging of Key West harbor. During the 19th century, sediment from repeated dredging projects was deposited a few hundred yards/meters off the northwestern corner of Key West, creating Tank Island (Sunset Key). Over the years, additional dredging projects created larger piles of sediment, eventually creating Wisteria Island. In 1925, the U.S. Public Health Service disinfecting steamer Wisteria, formerly a United States Lighthouse Service (one of the predecessors of the U.S. Coast Guard) light tender, sank where she was moored on the island and then burned to her waterline. The wreck was eventually salvaged, but the formerly unnamed spit of land kept the name of the ship as a reminder.

In the 1930s, the island was purchased from Monroe County by then-state representative Bernie Papy for $3,000. During the late 1930s and early 1940s, the island was the site of a "shark camp" owned by city building inspector Ray Knopp, which eventually grew into a commercial shark processing plant owned by Thompson Enterprises. The plant harvested sharks for their skins, turning them into clothing for sale to markets as far away as China.

In 1956, Papy sold the island to Wisteria Corp., a group formed with the intent of developing the island into commercial space and real estate. Wisteria Corp. was renamed to Wisteria Island, Inc. when it sold the island in 1967 to F.E.B. Corporation of Key West. Benjamin Bernstein, a prominent local real estate developer, was the principal behind the project and intended to develop the island into residential space. It totaled 21.5 acres (8.7 ha) at the time of the sale. F.E.B. subsequently negotiated the purchase of 150 acres (61 ha) of bay bottom surrounding the island from Monroe County, a transaction that took place the same year.

=== Annexation attempt ===
In April 2007, F.E.B. owner Roger Bernstein formally requested that the City of Key West annex the island, which had been considered a portion of unincorporated Monroe County. This would have allowed 168 units to be built on the island, due to the denser building codes of Key West compared with those of Monroe County. On May 1, 2007, the Key West City Commission, in a 5–2 vote, approved the first reading of an ordinance calling for the annexation of the island. Public opposition soon mounted and the second reading was tabled several times while voters gathered signatures for a petition opposing the high-density development plan. By July 10, 2007, over 3,000 signatures had been collected.

In a Key West City Commission meeting that evening, attorneys for Christmas Key Management Corporation announced that F.E.B. was withdrawing its request to have the island annexed to the city of Key West. At the same meeting, opponents of the plan announced that they would seek the inclusion of a non-binding referendum on the issue in the October 2007 city elections in order to gauge city support for curtailing development. One week later, a motion to include the referendum in the October 2 Key West City election ballot was turned down after several citizens and City Commissioners questioned its necessity after F.E.B. withdrew its annexation request.

In the wake of the failed county proposal, Key West Mayor Morgan McPherson proposed that the city of Key West purchase the island for conservation purposes. The idea, which was discussed in several City Commission meetings, was eventually tabled and the subject dropped.

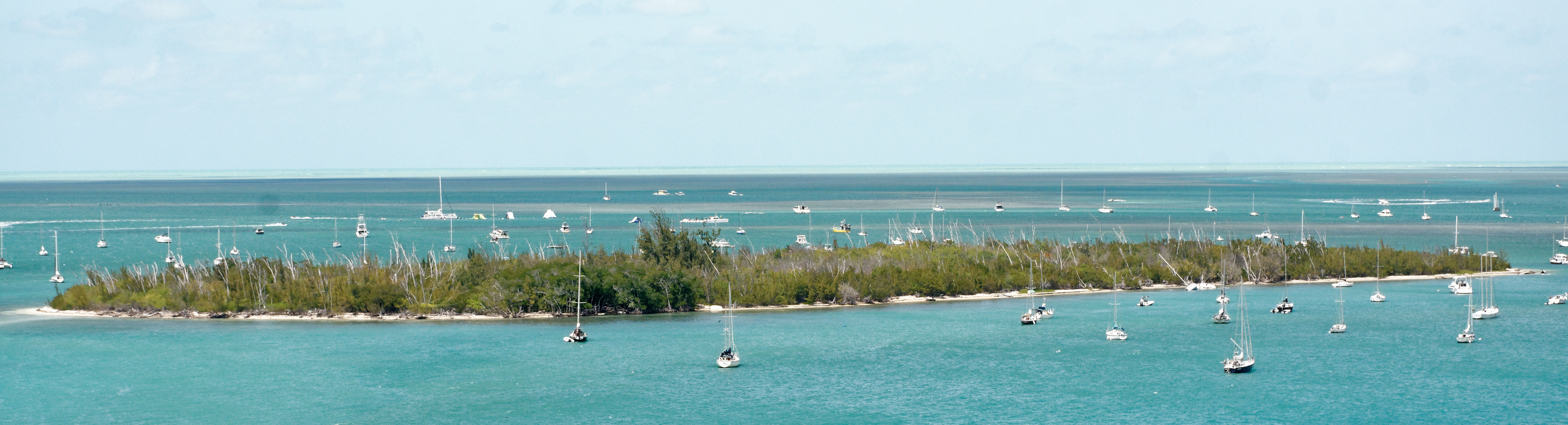
Wisteria Island

=== Development plans ===
Over a period of forty years, two separate developers have attempted to turn Wisteria Island into upscale housing and commercial real estate. In 1966, real estate developers David W. Wolkowsky and Clayton Partin announced they would be developing the island into a 60-home community complete with a small golf course, yacht club, dredged canals, and a lagoon in the center of the island. Wolkowsky and Partin hired a group of architectural consultants who had previously worked on the Lincoln Center. The design, which would have featured small bungalows scattered around a central lagoon, was estimated to cost $5 million at the time. The project was eventually abandoned, however, and the island lay empty of permanent inhabitants.

In 2007, F.E.B. announced a partnership with Ocean Properties, Limited. The partnership intends to develop the island in a manner similar to that of neighboring Sunset Key (Tank Island), which features high-value condominiums and vacation homes. Infrastructure for the development is still in the planning stages, but as the island currently has no electrical, sewer, or water connections, these would have to be developed. Key West city officials estimated a $20 million cost to develop the infrastructure needed for the island and to link it to Key West. Development plans are still in a state of flux, but initial drafts call for a marina, small shops, and affordable homes. On July 10, 2007, attorneys for the Christmas Key Management Corporation announced that F.E.B. was withdrawing an annexation request that would have included the island in the city of Key West proper. Under Key West's more relaxed building codes, 168 units could have been built on the island. Under Monroe County building codes, only two units can be built on the island, unless an exemption is granted. This fact made large-scale development of the island unlikely.

=== Ownership ===
In November 2011, the United States Department of the Interior (DOI) determined that the federal government actually owned the island, which it said had been under the stewardship of the United States Fish and Wildlife Service for almost fifty years. The DOI had originally indicated that because the island was made from fill and was not naturally occurring, it did not belong to the federal government. However, subsequent research by the DOI revealed presidential executive orders from 1908 and 1924 directing that the island be reserved for Navy use, and a 1962 executive order transferring ownership from the Navy to the Fish and Wildlife Service.

In 2020, a U.S. District Court judge ruled that the federal government owns Wisteria Island, as it was created by the Navy as a fill for dredging operations, and its deed was transferred from the Navy to the Department of the Interior in 1982.

Under Florida law, F.E.B. is entitled to seek a refund for having paid property taxes on Wisteria Island, but such a refund extends only to two years' worth of paid taxes.
