= Little Crawl Key =

- Little Crawl Key Little Crawl Key (the Caribbean)

Geography
- Location: Gulf of Mexico
- Coordinates: 24.742°N 80.984°W
- Archipelago: Florida Keys
- Adjacent to: Florida Straits

Administration
- United States
- State: Florida
- County: Monroe

Little Crawl Key is an island in the middle Florida Keys. It lies adjacent to Crawl Key, and the two islands are separated by a cove.
