= Dildo cactus =

Dildo cactus is a common name used for several species of long, narrow cactus, especially

- Acanthocereus tetragonus
- Brachycereus nesioticus
- Pilosocereus royenii

In addition, dildo is a common name of Opuntia stricta, and Pilosocereus polygonus is known as the Bahama dildo.
