= Parque Naucalli =

Park in Mexico City

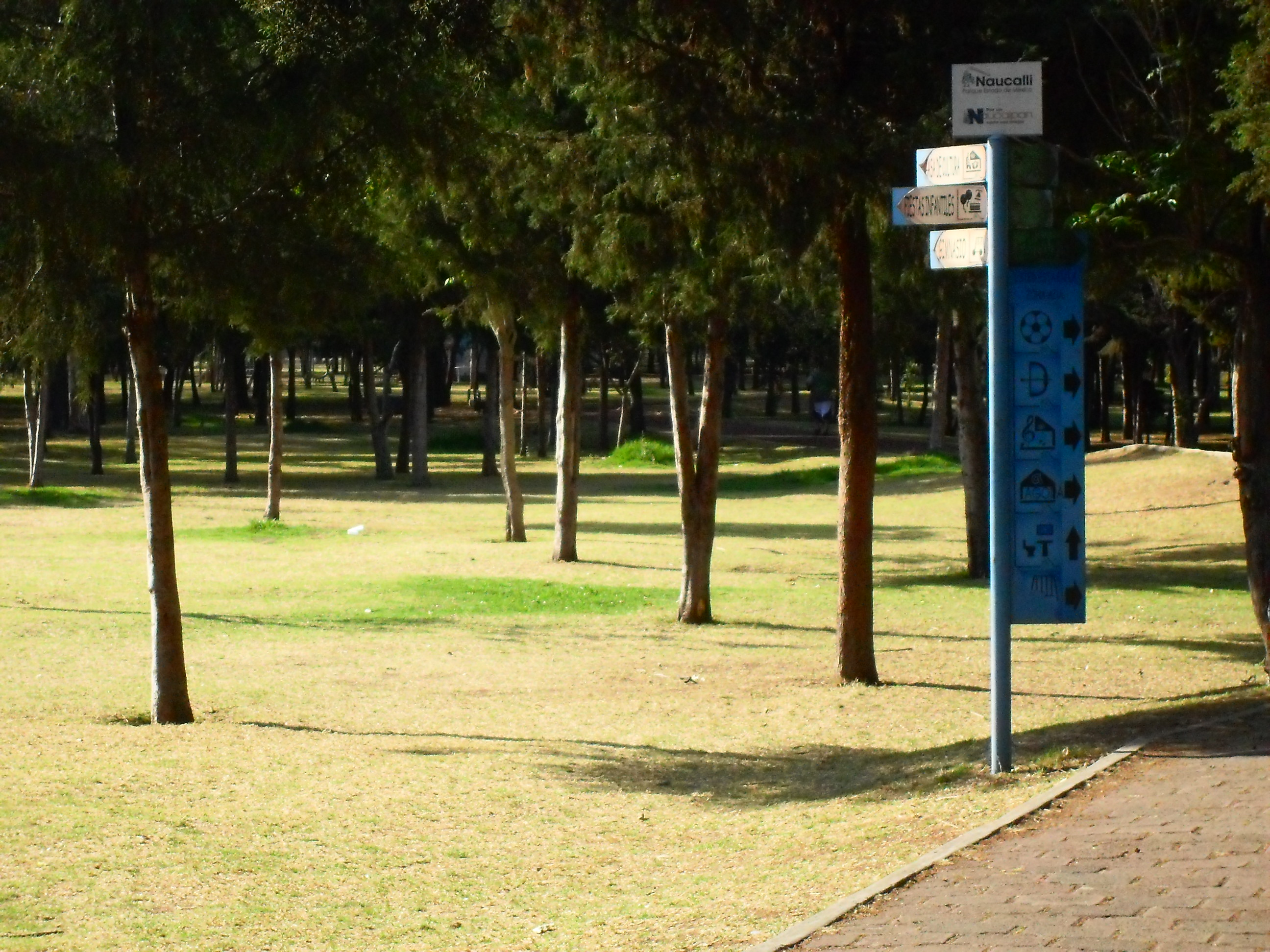
- View of Parque Naucalli
- Interactive map of Parque Naucalli
- Location: Naucalpan de Juárez, Mexico City, Mexico
- Coordinates: 19°29′33″N 99°14′24″W
- Opened: 2 October 1982

Parque Naucalli is a park just outside Mexico City in the municipality of Naucalpan de Juárez. Planning for the park began in 1975. Reforesting the area began in 1977 and the park opened to the public in 1982.
