= Melody Key =

Island in the United States of America

- Melody Key Melody Key (the Caribbean)

Geography
- Location: Gulf of Mexico
- Coordinates: 24°38′27″N 81°27′12″W
- Archipelago: Florida Keys
- Adjacent to: Florida Straits

Administration
- United States
- State: Florida
- County: Monroe

Melody Key is a privately owned island in the Florida Keys in Monroe County, Florida, United States. It is 5.5 acres-wide. As of 2012, it was the world's fifth most expensive island. As of January 2017, the island was listed for sale, at an asking price of $7 million. After being listed Melody Key suffered severe storm damage and later sold for $3.2 million via HGTV's Islands Hunters television show.
