= Meig's Key =

Small island north of the upper Florida Keys in Biscayne National Park

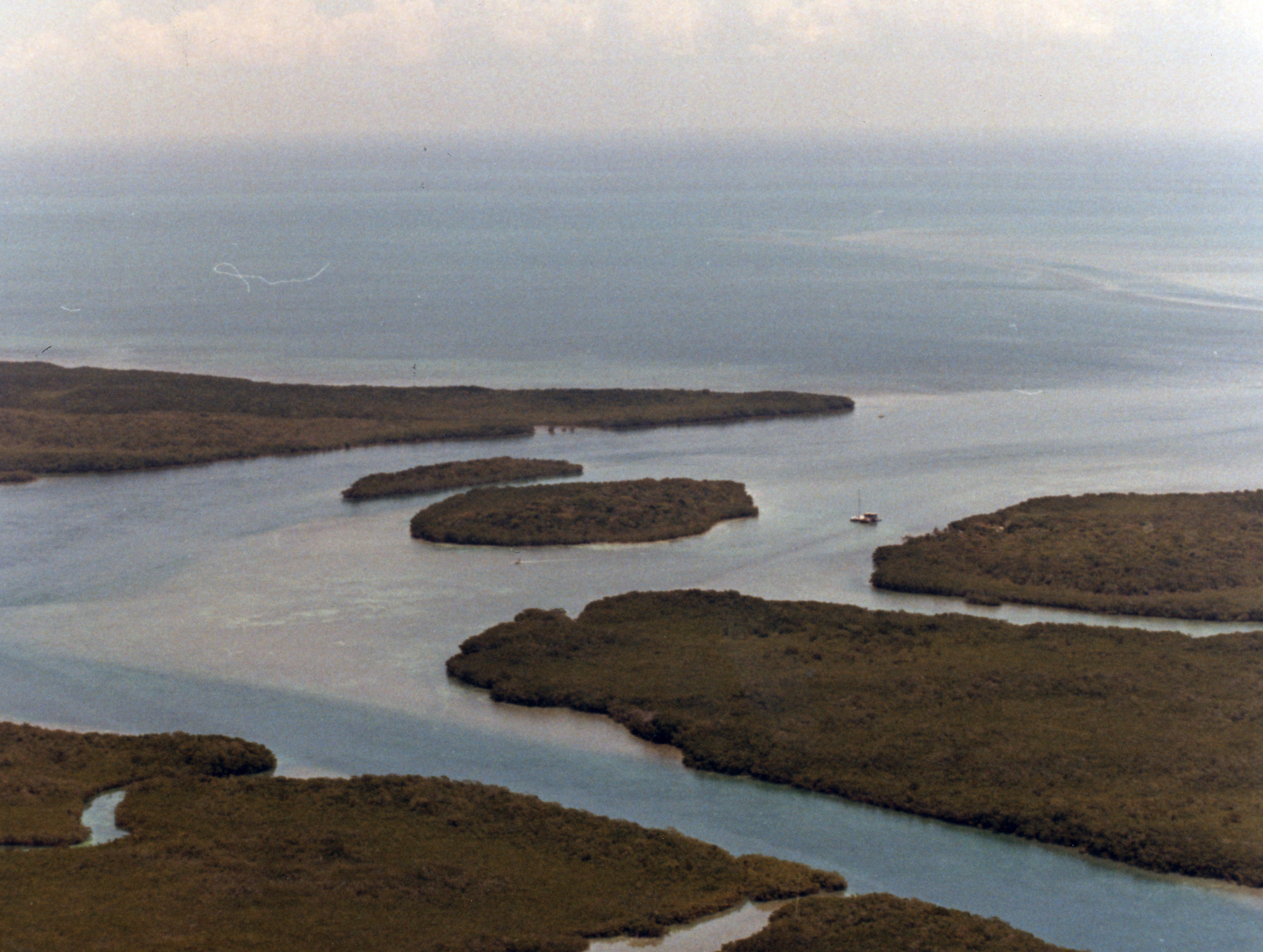
- Aerial view of Meig's Key, October 1987

- Meig's Key Meig's Key (North Atlantic)

Geography
- Location: Atlantic Ocean
- Coordinates: 25.3934°N 80.2340°W

Administration
- United States
- State: Florida
- County: Miami-Dade

Meig's Key is a small island north of the upper Florida Keys in Biscayne National Park. It is in Miami-Dade County, Florida.

It is located in southern Biscayne Bay, just north of Old Rhodes Key and Totten Key, just southeast off the southern tip of Elliott Key, and due south of Adams Key. It is on the south side of Caesar Creek, the creek that separates Elliott and Old Rhodes Keys.

== History ==
Its previous names were Black Caesar's Key and Caesar Key.

It was probably renamed for William Meigs, who came to the Biscayne Bay area from Philadelphia in 1891.

Gerdes, in his "Reconnaissance of the Florida Reefs and all the Keys" (1849) states: "Black Caesar's Key is an island, small, between Old Rhodes Key & Elliot's Key (Old Rhodes being nearest to N. of Key Largo); the opening on both sides is called Black Caesar's Creek." An environmental impact statement published in 1978 by the Biscayne National Monument contains a map which shows Caesar Key here.
