= Crawl Key =

Island in the middle Florida Keys, United States

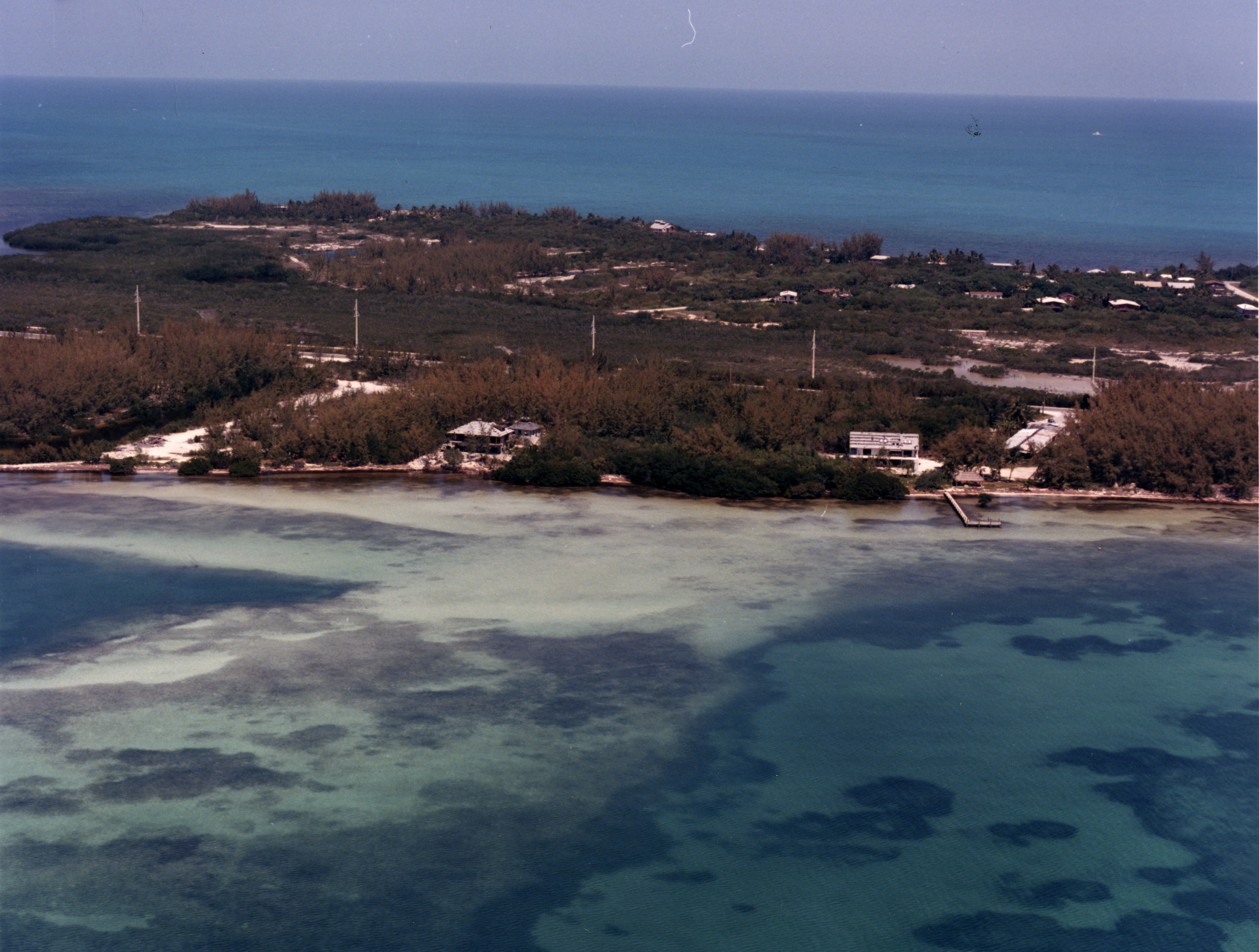
- Aerial view of Crawl Key, October 1987.

- Crawl Key Crawl Key (the Caribbean)

Geography
- Location: Gulf of Mexico
- Coordinates: 24°44′54″N 80°58′37″W
- Archipelago: Florida Keys
- Adjacent to: Florida Straits

Administration
- United States
- State: Florida
- County: Monroe

Crawl Key is an island in the middle Florida Keys.

U.S. 1 (or the Overseas Highway) traverses the key between Grassy Key and Long Point Key, which is part of a long stretch of road known as the Grassy Key Causeway.

It is entirely within the city of Marathon, Florida.

The island was named for the pens (kraals) where large sea turtles were once held until butchered for steaks and soup. The entrance to Curry Hammock State Park, on Little Crawl Key which is adjacent to Crawl Key on the oceanside, is located here. Crawl Key and Little Crawl Key are separated by a cove.
