= Lois Key =

- Lois Key Lois Key (the Caribbean)

Geography
- Location: Gulf of Mexico
- Coordinates: 24°36′51.65″N 81°28′29.66″W
- Archipelago: Florida Keys
- Adjacent to: Florida Straits

Administration
- United States
- State: Florida
- County: Monroe

Lois Key is an island in the lower Florida Keys approximately 20 miles (32 km) east of Key West.

Lois Key is not connected to the rest of the Florida Keys by bridge or by land. It is uninhabited, but until 1999, was the site of a commercially operated breeding colony of rhesus monkeys.

It can be accessed by boat from Summerland Key and was the subject of a controversial article in Slate magazine on Monkeyfishing which turned out to be fabricated.
