= Dildo Key =

Island in the Florida Bay

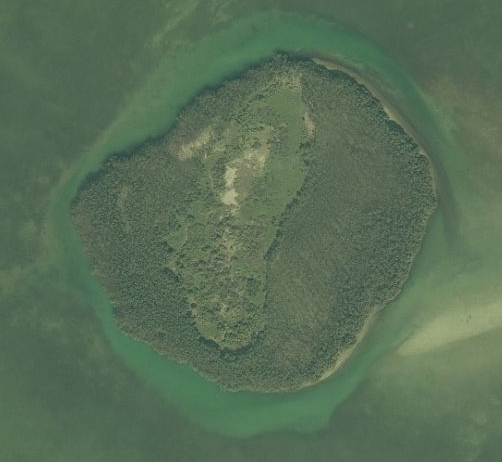
- Aerial photo of Dildo Key. Photograph encompasses about 0.3 km^{2}

- Dildo Key Dildo Key (the Caribbean)

Geography
- Location: Gulf of Mexico
- Coordinates: 25.059°N 80.885°W
- Archipelago: Florida Keys
- Adjacent to: Florida Straits

Administration
- United States
- State: Florida
- County: Monroe

Dildo Key is a small island in the Florida Bay in the U.S. state of Florida, located in Everglades National Park. It is named for the Dildo (Acanthocereus tetragonus), a native cactus species. Dildo Key has been noted for its unusual name.
