= Money Key =

Island in Monroe County, Florida, United States

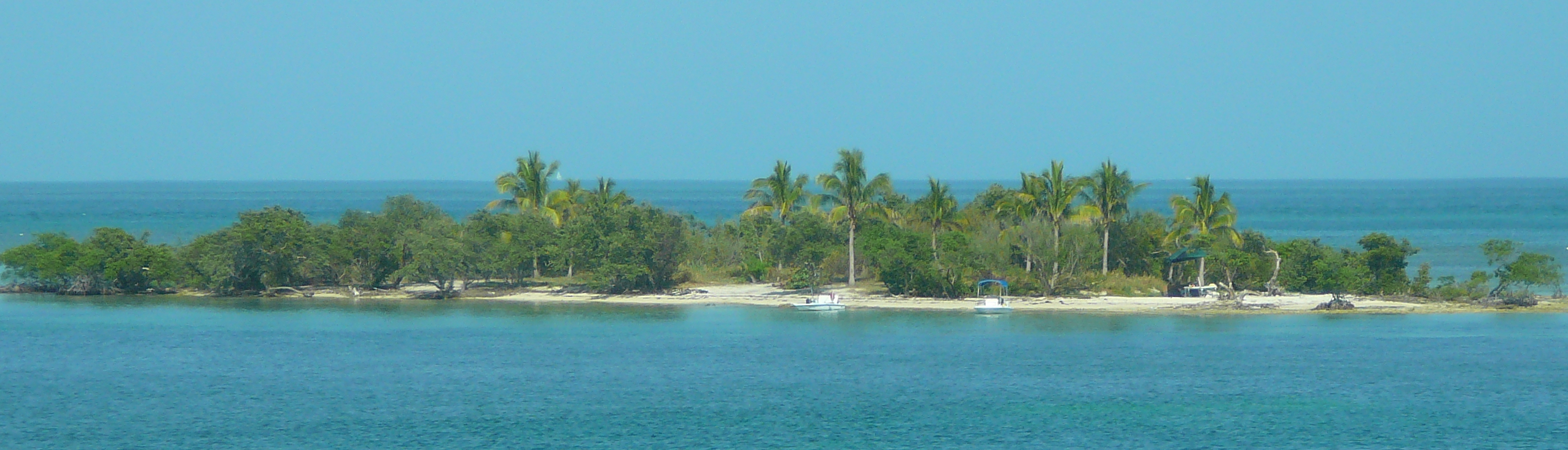
- Tiny Money Key, just off of the Seven Mile Bridge.

- Money Key Money Key (the Caribbean)

Geography
- Location: Gulf of Mexico
- Coordinates: 24.683482°N 81.215454°W
- Archipelago: Florida Keys
- Adjacent to: Florida Straits

Administration
- United States
- State: Florida
- County: Monroe

Money Key is a small island in Monroe County in the unincorporated, Lower Florida Keys (not to be confused with Little Money Key or Melody/Mystery Key). It is located in the Atlantic Ocean between Little Duck Key (formerly known as "Big Money Key") and Pigeon Key.

U.S. 1 (a/k/a the Overseas Highway) passes the key at approximately Mile Marker 42 (the island lies about 800 feet (240 m) south of the Seven Mile Bridge). There is no road access to the island.

A July 27, 1969 article in the Key West Citizen by E.R. Adams states that the key received its name because "pirate loot was found there; the actual amount was never revealed."

A March 1962 article in the Key West Citizen reported that "magazine writer Frank Harvey purchased Money Key, where he planned to live."

It has appeared in numerous Hollywood movies such as Licence to Kill (1989), True Lies (1994), 2 Fast 2 Furious (2003) and Mission: Impossible III (2006). Also a high-profile Lincoln automobile commercial in 2017.

The island has a small beach, many coconut trees, has sandbars around it, and is a good fishing spot.

Money Key is a private island and has been owned by the Kyle family since 1972. "No Trespassing" signs were posted in 2013 to stop illegal camping and visitation.
