= Sunset Key =

Island in the Florida Keys

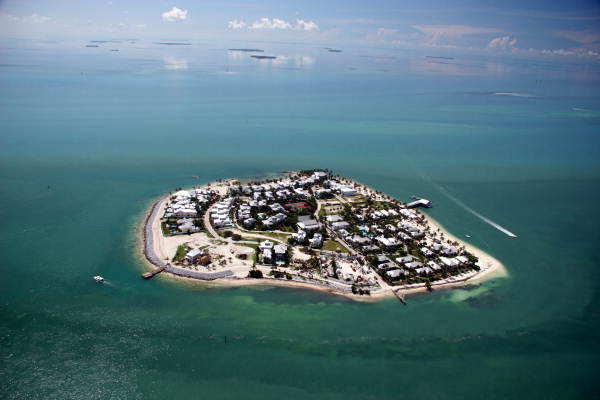
- Sunset Key is located a few hundred yards west off the island of Key West (2006)

- Sunset Key Sunset Key (the Caribbean)
- Interactive map of Sunset Key

Geography
- Location: Gulf of Mexico
- Coordinates: 24.561781°N 81.81334°W

Administration
- United States
- State: Florida
- County: Monroe

Sunset Key is a 27-acre (11-hectare) residential neighborhood and resort island in the city of Key West, Florida. It is located about 500 yards (460 m) off the coast of the island of Key West. The island is privately held among its residents. The island is accessible only by a shuttle boat that runs from the Opal Key Resort & Marina out to the island. As of 2006, the island consisted of a total of 48 single-family homes and 21 vacant lots.

Its closest neighbor is Wisteria Island, about 200 yards (180 m) north.

== History ==
Sunset Key's official name is Tank Island. The United States Navy constructed Tank Island to serve as a fuel tank depot during the Cold War. Dredging began in 1965 to form the island as well as to build passageways for submarines and other large vessels. However, the Navy's plans changed and the island saw little military action. Only two of the twelve planned fuel tanks were constructed, and although the fuel lines were run, the tanks were never filled.

In 1986, the government sold Tank Island and other anchorages in Key West in an auction to developer Pritam Singh. In 1988, the tanks were dismantled while the remaining fuel lines served as conduits for water, sewage, and utilities. Power cables were later laid alongside the existing fuel pipes.

In 1994, the island was sold and renamed Sunset Key. The island is now owned by Tom Walsh, who also owns the Opal Key Resort & Marina.

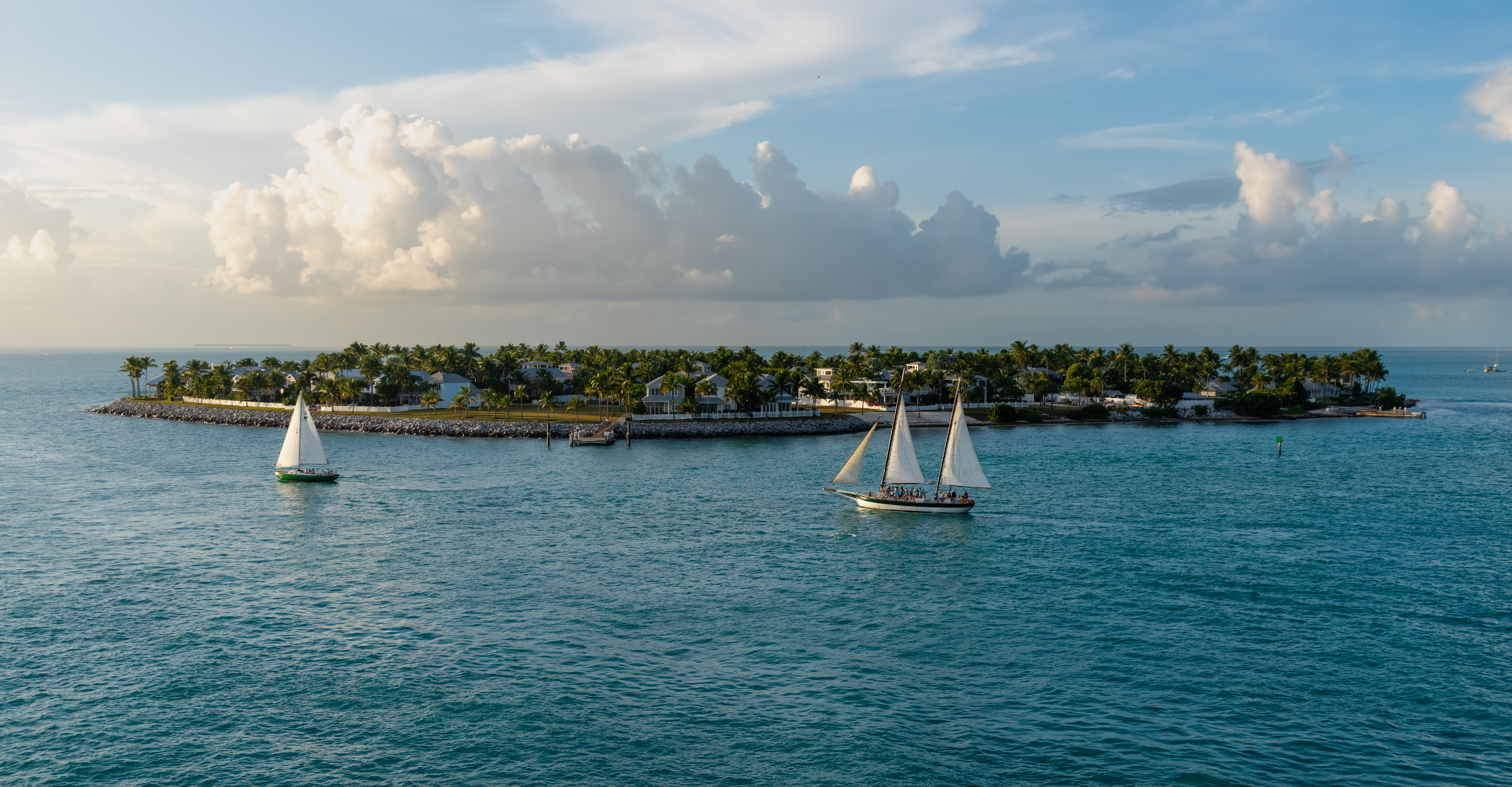
Sunset Key in 2025
