= Ballast Key =

Island in the Florida Keys, United States

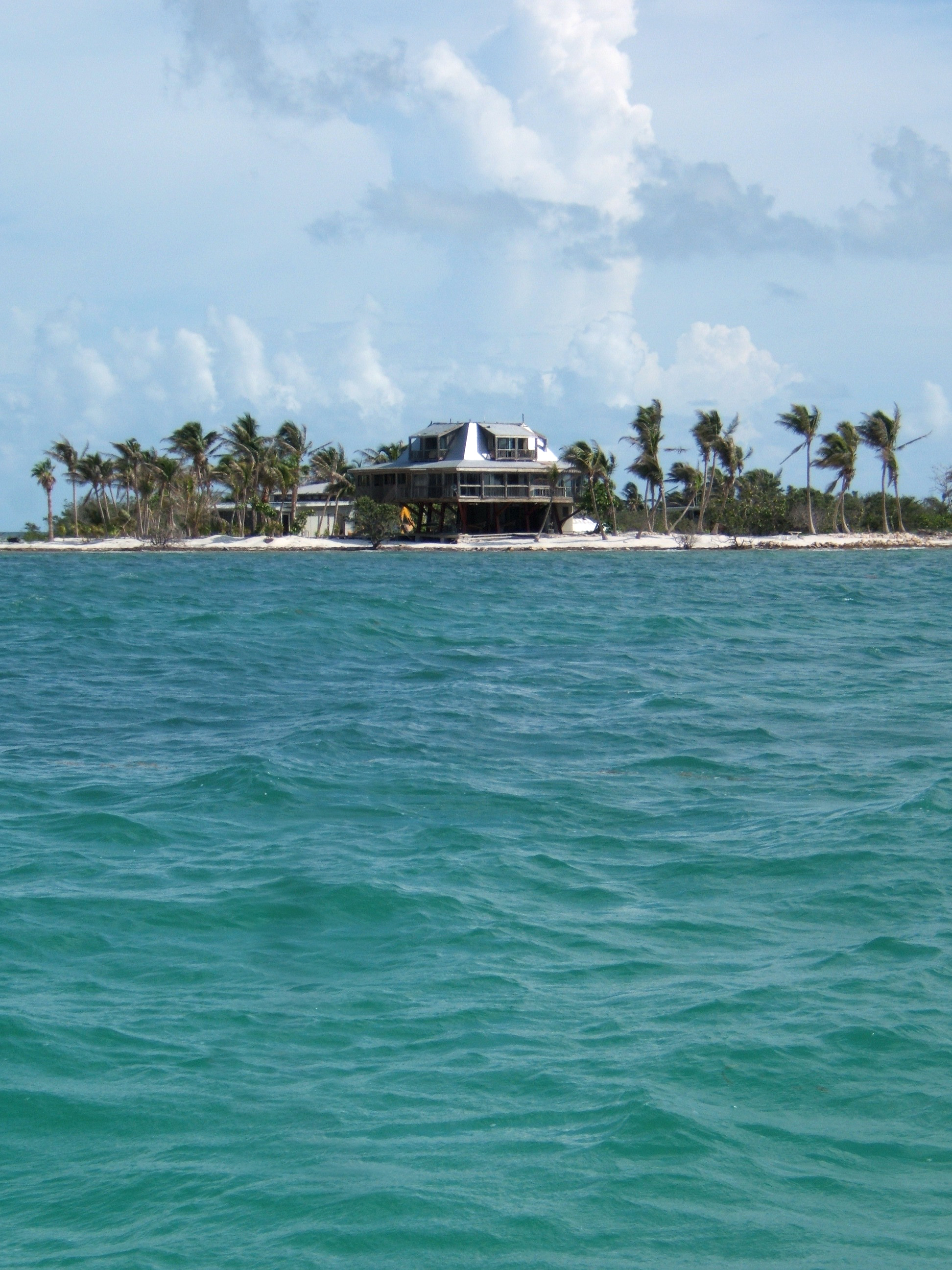
- Ballast Key

- Ballast Key Ballast Key (the Caribbean)

Geography
- Location: Gulf of Mexico
- Coordinates: 24°31′26″N 81°57′51″W
- Archipelago: Florida Keys
- Adjacent to: Florida Straits

Administration
- United States
- State: Florida
- County: Monroe

Ballast Key is an island in the Florida Keys in Monroe County, Florida, United States. It is the southernmost point of land in the contiguous United States. It was the last privately owned land within the boundaries of the Key West National Wildlife Refuge.

Located in the Outlying Islands of the Florida Keys, it is one of the Mule Keys that are nine miles (14 km) west of Key West. The island's 26 acres (11 ha) were donated by Key West developer David W. Wolkowsky to The Nature Conservancy, who deeded ownership of the land to the United States Fish and Wildlife Service while arranging to manage the resource.

Ballast Key had a cameo appearance in the Bond movie Licence to Kill and it and Mr. Wolkowsky made the pages of the novel as well. "David, it's James, James Bond...I've broken into your island. I hope you don't mind", reads a passage in the book. It is also used in the final scene of the 2015 science fiction thriller Self/less. Over the years, Wolkowsky hosted numerous artists, writers and celebrities on Ballast Key, including Jimmy Buffett, Tennessee Williams, Truman Capote, Nancy Friday, Judy Blume, John Hersey, John Malcolm Brinnin, Richard Wilbur, Robert Stone, British prime minister Edward Heath, Prince Michael of Greece, Tony Richardson, Timothy Greenfield-Sanders, The Bee Gees, Gloria Estefan, Natica Waterbury, Lucius Beebe, Lady Caroline Blackwood, and an occasional Vanderbilt, Rockefeller, Mellon, and Duke.

Tennessee Williams often painted canvases while visiting David Wolkowsky on Ballast Key in the late 1970s and early 1980s.

Ballast Key features a main house with four bedrooms and a master suite, and a fully equipped three-bedroom guesthouse overlooking a palm tree-lined sand beach. Water is supplied to the homes by desalination.
