= Key West National Wildlife Refuge =

United States National Wildlife Refuge in Florida

- IUCN category IV (habitat/species management area)
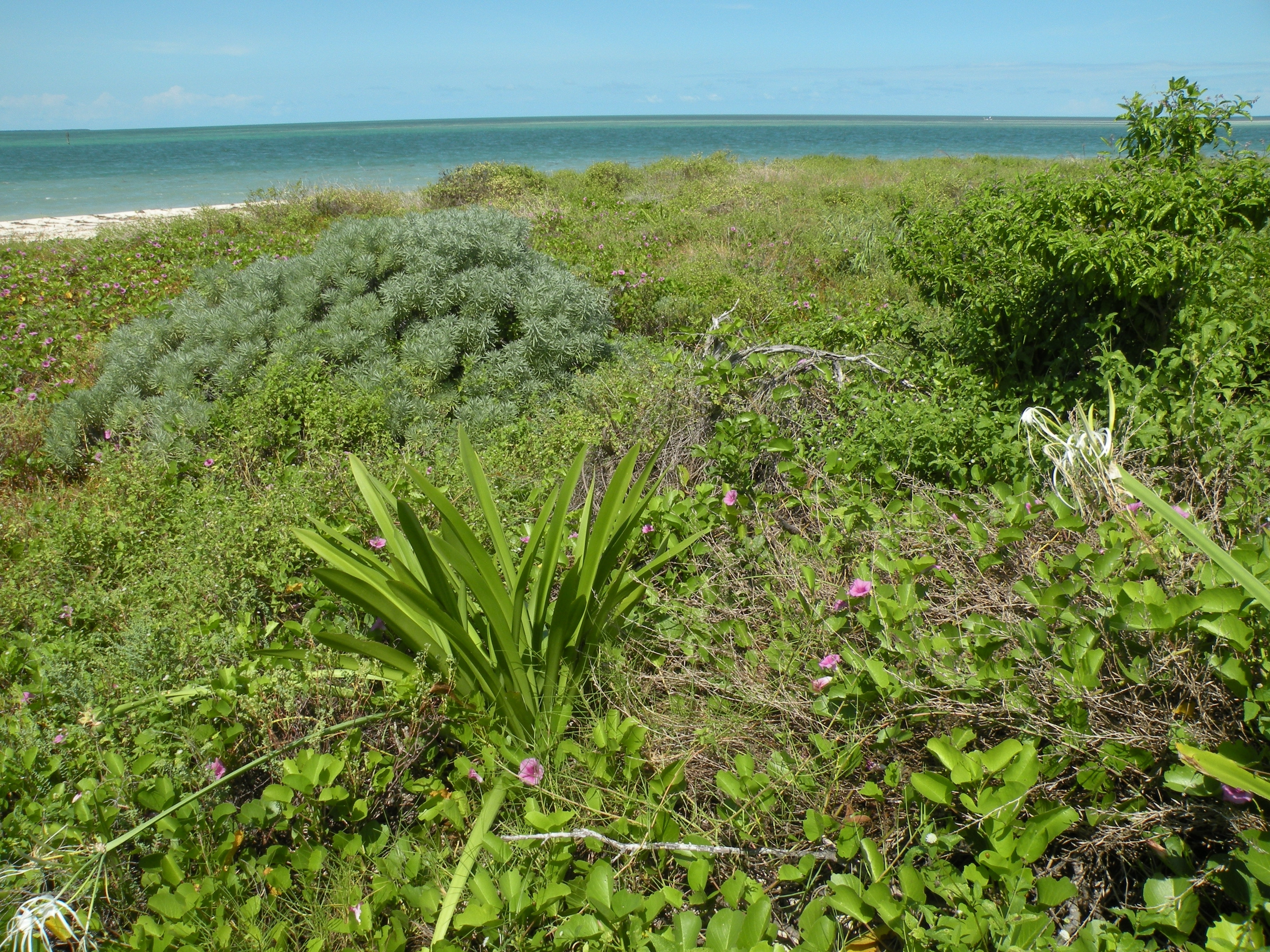
- Coastal vegetation in the refuge

- Location within the United States
- Location: Monroe County, Florida, United States
- Nearest city: Key West, Florida
- Coordinates: 24.569294°N 82.11525°W
- Area: 189,497 acres (76,687 ha)
- Established: 1908
- Visitors: 180,000 (estimated) (in 2004)
- Governing body: U.S. Fish and Wildlife Service
- Website: Key West National Wildlife Refuge

The Key West National Wildlife Refuge is a 189,497 acre (766.867 km^{2}) National Wildlife Refuge located in Monroe County, Florida, between Key West, Florida and the Dry Tortugas . Only 2,019 acres (8.171 km^{2}) of land are above sea level, on several keys within the refuge. These keys are unpopulated and are also designated as Wilderness within the Florida Keys Wilderness. The refuge was established to provide a preserve and breeding ground for native birds and other wildlife as well as to provide habitat and protection for endangered and threatened fish, wildlife, plants and migratory birds.

In addition to the 189,497 acres (767 km^{2}) of land owned by the refuge, the refuge maintains 154 acres (.623 km^{2}) for the United States Coast Guard and 206,289 acres (834.822 km^{2}) of marine waters in conjunction with the state of Florida.

The refuge is one of three refuges administered by the National Key Deer Refuge on Big Pine Key in Florida. Although Key West NWR is unstaffed, the National Key Deer Refuge has a combined staff of 13 with a fiscal year 2005 budget of $1,041,000.

== History ==
Key West NWR was established in 1908 by President Theodore Roosevelt as a preserve and breeding ground for native birds and other wildlife to curtail the slaughter of birds whose feathers were highly valued in the hat industry. Wading birds were threatened with extinction before this refuge began providing a safe haven for them and other threatened plant and animal species. This refuge was the first established in the Florida Keys and one of the earliest refuges in the United States. They have over 250 different bird species there.

=== Facilities ===
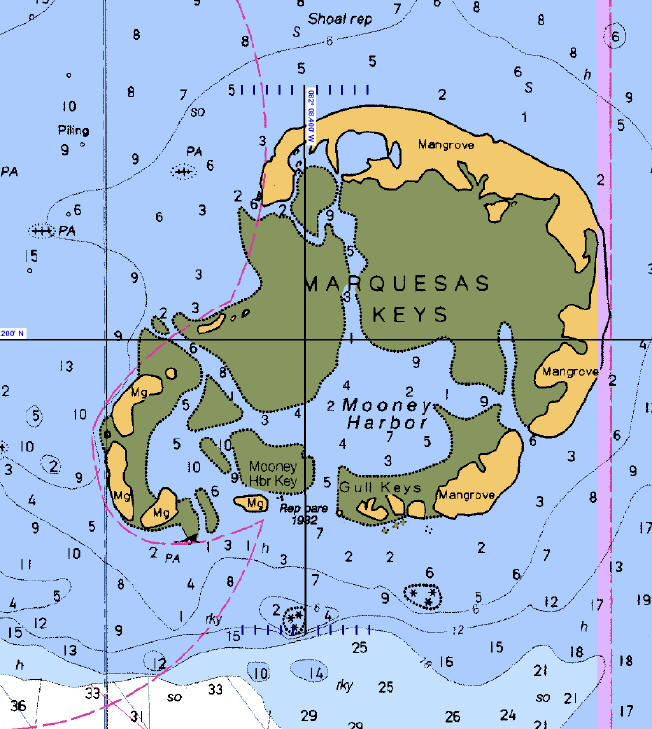
Marquesas Keys

There is no visitor center at the refuge. The refuge is accessible only by boat. Two of the islands have portions of their beaches closed to the public. Portions of Woman Key and Boca Grande Key are posted as closed for the sensitive habitat they contain. The remainder of the beaches, including those at the Marquesas Keys, are open during daylight hours for compatible, wildlife-oriented recreational uses such as wildlife observation, nature photography, and environmental education.

== Topography ==
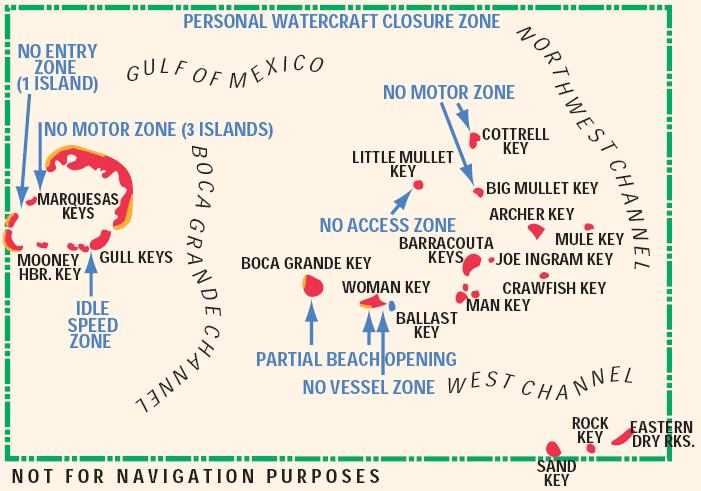
Map of the refuge

The refuge encompasses more than 300 square miles (800 km^{2}) of open water and 2,019 acres (8 km^{2}) of land on the 26 islands of Mule Keys and of Marquesas Keys. The Refuge includes mostly mangrove islands, with a few sandy beaches and dunes that are critical nesting habitat for endangered sea turtles. Other habitat includes salt marsh and coastal berm hammocks, plus sea grass and coral reef communities.

== Wildlife and protected species ==
The refuge, along with the Great White Heron National Wildlife Refuge, represents the last of the offshore (and raccoon-free) islands in the lower Florida Keys available as critical nesting, roosting, wading and loafing habitat to over 250 avian species — particularly wading birds. The area managed is overwhelmingly (99 percent) marine environment including large sand flats surrounding the islands that are used extensively by wading birds when they forage.

The refuge protects habitat for a wide variety of birds, including nesting or wintering populations of terns, magnificent frigatebirds, white-crowned pigeons, ospreys, and great white herons. Several federally listed species are monitored, such as piping plovers and bald eagles. Birds in the refuge are doing well as evidenced by stable or increasing populations and nest numbers.

The sandy beaches are nesting areas for the endangered Atlantic green and loggerhead turtles and is the only breeding site in the U.S. for the endangered hawksbill turtle. Sea turtle nests are surveyed each year to track nesting and reproduction of the turtles. There are few beaches in the refuge suitable for sea turtle nesting; thus there are typically less than 50 nests found each year. Green sea turtles nests are increasing, which is a positive sign since green sea turtle activity had not changed in several years. The low number of nests makes it difficult to determine nesting trends, but activity appears to be stable.

== See also ==
- List of National Wildlife Refuges
