= List of island municipalities in Florida =

This is a list of Florida municipalities that are located entirely on islands. Most of the island municipalities of Florida are located on barrier islands. Barrier islands stretch for 1,200 kilometres (750 miles) along the coast of Florida, with an area of 1,630 square kilometres (630 sq mi). As of 2000, about 700,000 people lived on barrier islands in Florida. All but three of the other island municipalities in Florida are in the Florida Keys, or on artificial islands in Biscayne Bay.

Municipality	County	Island(s)	Type (Note: Florida municipalities may be called "Cities", "Towns", or "Villages". There is no legal distinction in their powers, functions, or size based on those titles.)	Notes
Anna Maria	Manatee	Anna Maria Island (part)	City	
Bal Harbour	Miami-Dade	Miami Beach Island (part)	Village	
Bay Harbour Islands	Miami-Dade	East Island, West Island	Town	
Belleair Beach	Pinellas	Sand Key	City	
Belleair Shore	Pinellas	Sand Key	Town	
Beverly Beach	Flagler	Unnamed barrier island (Note: The barrier island extending from the Matanzas Inlet to the Ponce de Leon Inlet does not have an official or common name.) (part)	Town	
Bradenton Beach	Manatee	Anna Maria Island (part)	City	
Briny Breezes	Palm Beach	Unnamed barrier island (Note: The barrier island extending from the South Lake Worth Inlet to the Boca Raton Inlet has no official or common name. The island was separated from the mainland in the 1890s when the Florida East Coast Canal (now part of the Intracoastal Waterway) was dug from the south end of Lake Worth Lagoon to Lake Boca Raton.) (part)	Town	
Cape Canaveral	Brevard	Canaveral Peninsula (Note: The Canaveral Peninsula is a barrier peninsula extending southwest from Cape Canaveral to Port Canaveral.) (part) and unnamed barrier island (Note: The barrier island extending from Port Canaveral to the Sebastian Inlet does not have an official or common name.) (part)	City	
Cedar Key	Levy	Cedar Key and other islands in the Cedar Keys	City	
Cocoa Beach	Brevard	Unnamed barrier island (part)	City	
Daytona Beach Shores	Volusia	Unnamed barrier island (part)	City	
Destin	Okaloosa	Moreno Point (barrier peninsula) (part)	City	
Fernandina Beach	Nassau	Amelia Island (part)	City	
Fort Myers Beach	Lee	Estero Island	Town	
Golden Beach	Miami-Dade	Unnamed barrier island (Note: The barrier island extending from Port Everglades to the Baker's Haulover Inlet has no official or common name.) (part)	Town	
Gulf Stream	Palm Beach	Unnamed barrier island (part)	Town	
Highland Beach	Palm Beach	Unnamed barrier island (part)	Town	
Hillsboro Beach	Broward	Deerfield Beach Island	Town	
Holmes Beach	Manatee	Anna Maria Island (part)	City	
Hypoluxo	Palm Beach	Palm Beach Island (Note: Palm Beach Island was a bay barrier (a coastal barrier connected at both ends to the mainland) in the middle of the 19th century, completely separating Lake Worth from the Atlantic Ocean. The opening of the Lake Worth Inlet in 1876 converted most of the bay barrier into a barrier spit, or peninsula. The construction of the Florida East Coast Canal from Lake Worth to Lake Boca Raton in the late 19th century converted the Palm Beach peninsula and all of the barrier coast south to the Boca Raton Inlet into a barrier island. The opening of the South Lake Worth Inlet in 1926–1927 separated Palm Beach Island from the unnamed barrier island.) (part)	Town	
Islamorada	Monroe	Five islands (Note: Islands in Islamorada include: Tea Table Key, Lower Matecumbe Key, Upper Matecumbe Key, Windley Key, and Plantation Key)	Village	
Indialantic	Brevard	Unnamed barrier island (part)	Town	
Indian Creek	Miami-Dade	Indian Creek Island	Village	
Indian Harbor Beach	Brevard	Unnamed barrier island (part)	City	
Indian River Shores	Indian River	North Hutchinson Island (part)	Town	
Indian Rocks Beach	Pinellas	Sand Key (part)	City	
Indian Shores	Pinellas	Sand Key (part)	Town	
Juno Beach	Palm Beach	Unnamed barrier island (Note: Most of the barrier island extending from the Jupiter Inlet to the Lake Worth Inlet has no official or common name. The southernmost part of the island is known as Singer Island.) (part)	Town	
Jupiter Inlet Colony	Palm Beach	Jupiter Island (part)	Town	
Jupiter Island	Martin	Jupiter Island (part)	Town	
Key Biscayne	Miami-Dade	Key Biscayne (part)	Village	
Key Colony Beach	Monroe	Shelter Key, Fat Deer Key	Town	
Key West	Monroe	Key West Island and others (Note: Other islands in Key West include: Stock Island, Sigsbee Park, Fleming Key, and Sunset Key)	City	
Layton	Monroe	Long Key (part)	City	
Lauderdale-by-the-Sea	Broward	Unnamed barrier island (Note: The barrier island extending from the Hillsboro Inlet to Port Everglades has no official or common name.) (part)	Town	
Lazy Lake	Broward	Unnamed island (Note: Lazy Lake is an enclave in Wilton Manors, on an island surrounded by the North and South Forks of the Middle River, and canals connecting the upper reaches of those rivers.) (part)	Village	
Longboat Key	Manatee (part); Sarasota (part)	Longboat Key	Town	
Madiera Beach	Pinellas	Sand Key (part)	City	
Manalapan	Palm Beach	Palm Beach Island (part), Hypoluxo Island (part)	Town	
Marathon	Monroe	Seven islands (Note: Islands in Marathon include: Knight's Key, Boot Key, Key Vaca, Fat Deer Key, Long Point Key, Crawl Key, and Grassy Key)	City	
Marco Island	Collier	Marco Island	City	
Marineland	Flagler (part); St. Johns (part)	Unnamed barrier island (part)	Town	
Melbourne Beach	Brevard	Unnamed barrier island (part)	Town	
Miami Beach	Miami-Dade	Miami Beach Island (part) and others (Note: Other islands in Miami Beach include: Allison Island, Belle Isle, Biscayne Point, Di Lido Island, Flagler Monument Island, Hibiscus Island, Isle of Normandy, La Gorce Island, Normandy Shores, Palm Island, Rivo Alto Island, San Marino Island, and Star Island)	City	
North Bay Village	Miami-Dade	North Bay/Harbor Island and Treasure Island (Biscayne Bay)	City	
North Redington Beach	Pinellas	Sand Key (part)	Town	
Ocean Breeze	Martin	South Hutchinson Island (part)	Town	
Ocean Ridge	Palm Beach	Unnamed barrier island (part)	Town	
Orchid	Indian River	North Hutchinson Island (part) and others (Note: Other islands in Orchid include Plug Island, Preacher's Island, and Horseshoe Island)	Town	
Palm Beach	Palm Beach	Palm Beach Island (part)	Town	
Palm Beach Shores	Palm Beach	Singer Island (part)	Town	
Ponce Inlet	Volusia	Unnamed barrier island (part)	Town	
Redington Beach	Pinellas	Sand Key (part)	Town	
Redington Shores	Pinellas	Sand Key (part)	Town	
St. Augustine Beach	St. Johns	Anastasia Island (part)	City	
St. Pete Beach	Pinellas	Long Key	City	
Sanibel	Lee	Sanibel Island	City	
Satellite Beach	Brevard	Unnamed barrier island (part)	City	
Sea Ranch Lakes	Broward	Unnamed barrier island (part)	Village	
South Palm Beach	Palm Beach	Palm Beach Island (part)	Town	
Sunny Isles Beach	Miami-Dade	Unnamed barrier island (part)	City	
Surfside	Miami-Dade	Miami Beach Island (part)	Town	
Treasure Island	Pinellas	Treasure Island	City	
Wilton Manors	Broward	Unnamed island (Note: Most of Wilton Manors is on an island between the North and South Forks of the Middle River, and canals that connect the upper reaches of those rivers. A small part of Wilton Manors is on the north side of the North Fork, on the mainland.) (part)	City	
