= Overseas Highway =

Highway through the Florida Keys to Key West, Florida, USA

U.S. Highway 1
- Overseas Highway
- Overseas Highway highlighted in red

Route information
- Maintained by FDOT
- Length: 106.5 mi (171.4 km)
- Existed: January 5, 1928–present
- Tourist routes: Florida Keys Scenic Highway

Major junctions
- South end: US 1 / SR A1A in Key West, FL
- CR 905 in Key Largo, FL
- North end: US 1 (Dixie Highway) at the Monroe–Miami-Dade county line

Location
- Country: United States
- State: Florida
- Counties: Monroe County

Highway system
- United States Numbered Highway System; List; Special; Divided; Florida State Highway System; Interstate; US; State; Former; Pre‑1945; Toll; Scenic

The Overseas Highway is a 113-mile (181.9 km) highway carrying U.S. Route 1 (US 1) through the Florida Keys to Key West. Large parts of it were built on the former right-of-way of the Overseas Railroad, the Key West Extension of the Florida East Coast Railway. Completed in 1912, the Overseas Railroad was heavily damaged and partially destroyed in the 1935 Labor Day hurricane. The Florida East Coast Railway was financially unable to rebuild the destroyed sections, so the roadbed and remaining bridges were sold to the state of Florida for $640,000.

Since the 1950s, the Overseas Highway has been refurbished into a main coastal highway between the cities of Miami and Key West, offering travelers an exotic roadway through a tropical savanna environment and access to the largest area of coral reefs on the U.S. mainland. Many exotic animals such as the American alligator, American crocodile, and Key deer inhabit the tropical islands of the Florida Keys.

== Route description ==
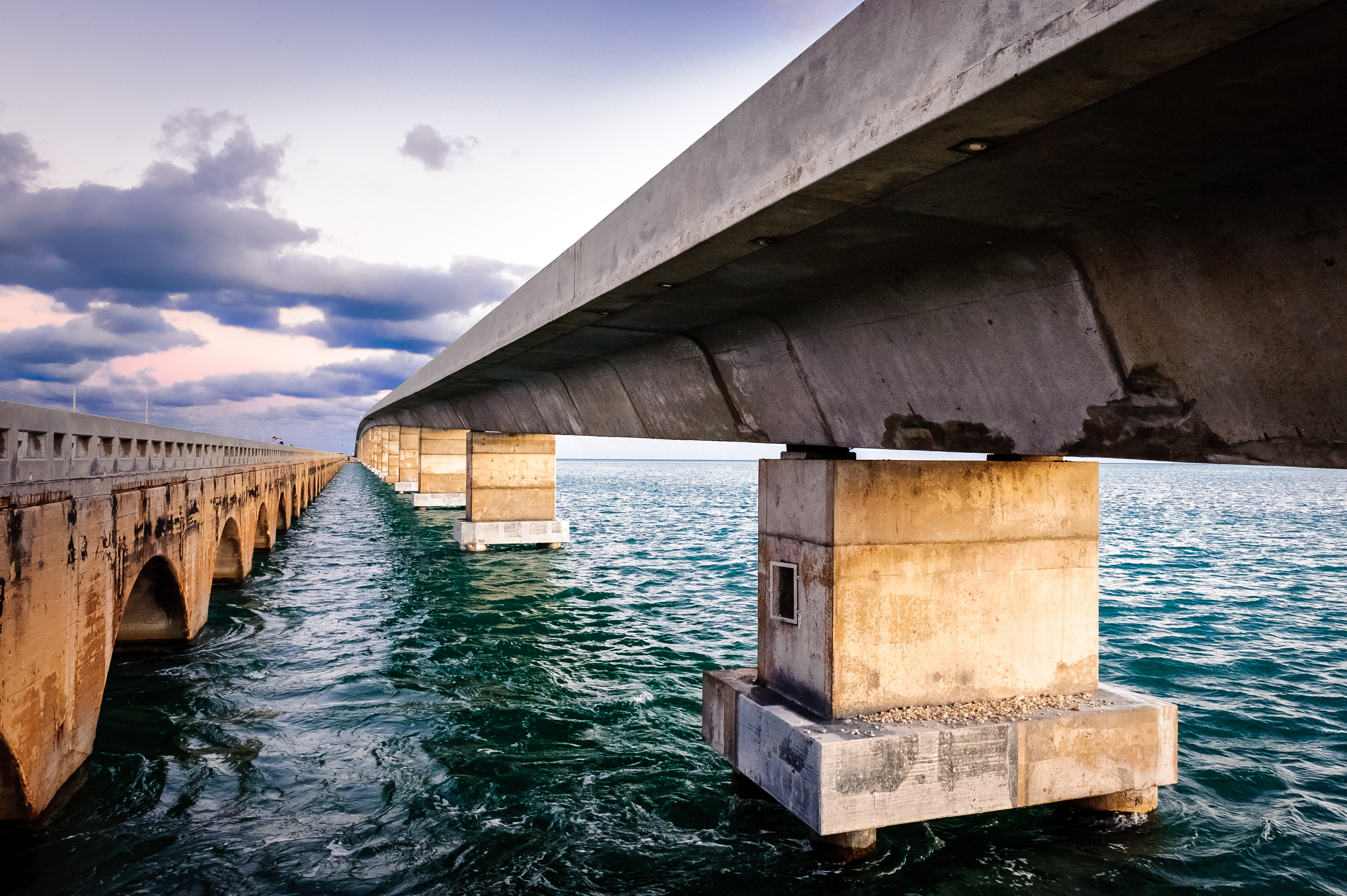
Overseas Highway and Railway bridges, Florida Keys

The Overseas Highway begins at a T intersection between US 1 and SR A1A, from which it heads east. After crossing to Stock Island and forming the boundary between the eponymous district and incorporated Key West, US 1 proceeds through unincorporated Monroe County on Boca Chica Key, past Naval Air Station Key West, and Rockland Key, where the Overseas Highway drops down to a two-lane road. It then crosses East Rockland Key, Big Coppitt Key (and its congruous district), Saddlebunch Keys, Sugarloaf Key, Park Key, Cudjoe Key (and its congruous district), Summerland Key, Ramrod Key, Middle Torch Key, Little Torch Key, Big Pine Key (and its congruous district), Scout Key, and Spanish Harbor Key. The highway expands to four lanes as it crosses the Bahia Honda Bridge, then reduces to two lanes as it traverses Bahia Honda Key, Ohio Key, Missouri Key, and Little Duck Key. After Little Duck Key, US 1 enters Knights Key, Boot Key, Key Vaca, and the town of Marathon via the Seven Mile Bridge, thus leaving the lower Keys.

US 1 runs through Marathon as a four-lane road. After Key Vaca, the road becomes two-lane once more and runs through Fat Deer Key, where it forms the northern boundary of the city of Key Colony Beach. It then continues wholly in Marathon through Long Point Key, Crawl Key, and Grassy Key. The road then crosses to Little Conch Key and then Conch Key, both part of the Duck Key district. US 1 then crosses to and traverses Long Key, which is mostly unincorporated except for the city of Layton, which the highway passes through. The road then reaches Craig Key, and then the village of Islamorada including Lower Matecumbe Key, Tea Table Key, Upper Matecumbe Key, and Windley Key. US 1 crosses a drawbridge onto Plantation Key, where it expands to four lanes and then leaves Islamorada as it crosses to Key Largo. Immediately the Overseas Highway enters Tavernier, where it temporarily splits into a pair of one-way roads through the community. Soon, the road enters the community of Key Largo, which also features another pair of one-way roads. At the northern end of the Key Largo district, about two-thirds of the way along the island, US 1 intersects County Road 905 (CR 905), which offers an alternative route out of the Keys via North Key Largo and the Card Sound Bridge. Signage approaching the intersection directs northbound motorists to take this alternative route if the lights on it are flashing. US 1 swings to the northwest, forms the southern boundary of North Key Largo, and becomes a two-lane divided road after the intersection. After crossing the Jewfish Creek Bridge (where it enters unincorporated Monroe County again) and traveling along Cross Key, US 1 crosses Manatee Creek, along with the Miami-Dade County boundary, and reaches the mainland.

=== Mile markers ===
The Florida Department of Transportation ("FDOT") maintains mile marker signs in the Florida Keys portion of Monroe County along the Overseas Highway (U.S. Highway No. 1). Numbering commences at "0" in Key West, and increases towards the east until Islamorada where the direction changes to the northeast following the Overseas Highway to Key Largo at "106." Outside of the city of Key West and the city of Marathon, street addresses along the Overseas Highway in the Keys correspond to the mile markers. For example, the Tropical Research Laboratory of Mote Marine Laboratory has a physical address of 24244 Overseas Highway. The first two digits indicate that the Laboratory is located at Mile Marker 24 (corresponding to an address on Summerland Key). The next two digits indicate that it is about a quarter of a mile east of the Mile Marker 24 sign (MM 24.24), while the last digit, because it is an even number, indicates that it is located on the gulf side of the Overseas Highway (the term "gulf side" is used in the Middle and Lower Keys as the Overseas Highway runs east-west there; the term "bayside" is used in the Upper Keys where the Overseas Highway runs north-south. All of the Keys use the term "oceanside"):

- The first two-to-three digits denote the Mile Marker, while the next digit denotes the nearest tenth of a mile (e.g., MM 102.5).
- An address ending in an odd number indicates the location is on the Atlantic or oceanside of the Overseas Highway, while an address ending in an even number indicates the location is on the Florida Bay/Gulf of Mexico or bayside of the Overseas Highway.

Exceptions to this rule do exist, however. There are occasional addresses ending in even numbers on the oceanside and vice versa.

== History ==
SR 4A, former designation for the Overseas Highway

While the Overseas Highway today runs along the former Overseas Railroad right of way, portions of the highway came into existence earlier in a different alignment while the railroad was still operating. The concept of an Overseas Highway began with the Miami Motor Club in 1921. The Florida land boom of the 1920s was underway and the club wanted to attract tourists to easily reached fishing areas, which could only be reached by boat or train at the time. The land boom also attracted real estate interests who sought vehicular access to the upper keys where there were thousands of acres of undeveloped land. The completion of the railroad further proved a highway through the keys was feasible.

=== 1920s–1935: Original Overseas Highway ===
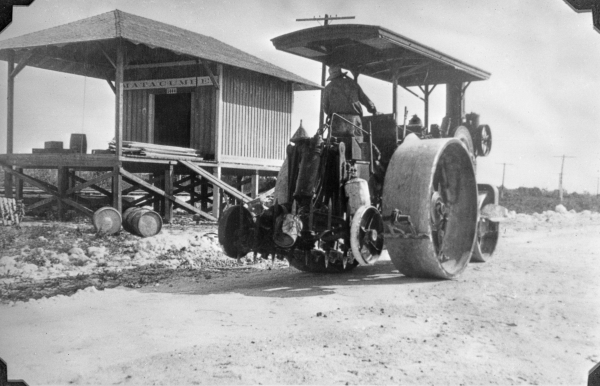
Construction of the original highway next to Matecumbe railroad station

Construction on the original Overseas Highway, designated State Road 4A (an extension of a route running from Miami to Homestead), lasted through most of the mid 1920s. Officially opening for traffic on January 25, 1928, the original highway existed in two segments at its greatest extent. One segment ran from the mainland via Card Sound Road to Key Largo and extended as far as Lower Matecumbe Key, while a segment in the lower keys existed from No Name Key to Key West. An automobile ferry service connected the 41-mile gap between Lower Matecumbe and No Name Keys. State Road 4A mostly ran alongside of the Overseas Railroad in the upper keys but in the lower keys, it followed a much different path than the railroad and current highway. The ferry landing on No Name Key was located at the end of what is now Watson Boulevard, which carried State Road 4A across No Name Key and Big Pine Key before it crossed to Little Torch Key. On Little Torch Key, it turned south and rejoined the railroad. It would continue along the north side of the railroad to Upper Sugarloaf Key, where it turned south and ran along the southern shoreline of Lower Sugarloaf Key, the Saddlebunch Keys, Geiger Key, and Boca Chica Key. On Boca Chica Key, it followed the shoreline south of Naval Air Station Key West's airstrip to Boca Chica Beach before crossing to Stock Island. On Stock Island, it followed Maloney Avenue and MacDonald Avenue where it rejoined the Overseas Railroad heading into Key West. Most of the State Road 4A bridges in the Lower Keys were of wooden construction and had been in use since the early 1920s.

Interactive Map of the Original Highway segments and Key Vaca Road (red) in relation to the Overseas Railroad/Current Highway (blue). Click to Enlarge.

By the early 1930s, it was clear that the ferries were insufficient for the travel needs of the keys, and Monroe County and the State Road Department began making plans to connect the two portions of State Road 4A to make a continuous highway. In 1931, a 12 mile road was built just north of the Overseas Railroad through the community of Marathon. This road was known as Key Vaca Road and ferry terminals were built at each end at Grassy Key and Hog Key. The completion of Key Vaca Road allowed the ferry route to be split into two shorter routes. The drive from Key West to the mainland was reduced by an hour after the addition of Key Vaca Road. In 1933, the state legislature created the Overseas Road and Toll Bridge District to seek federal funding to extend and connect the roadways, though funding was scarce as the country was in the Great Depression. Funding would eventually come through the Federal Emergency Relief Administration, a program established by President Franklin D. Roosevelt's New Deal. Hundreds of disgruntled World War I veterans seeking early payment of wartime pensions were employed for construction on the roadway and bridges as part of a government relief program.

=== 1935–1940s: Labor Day Hurricane and completion of the highway ===
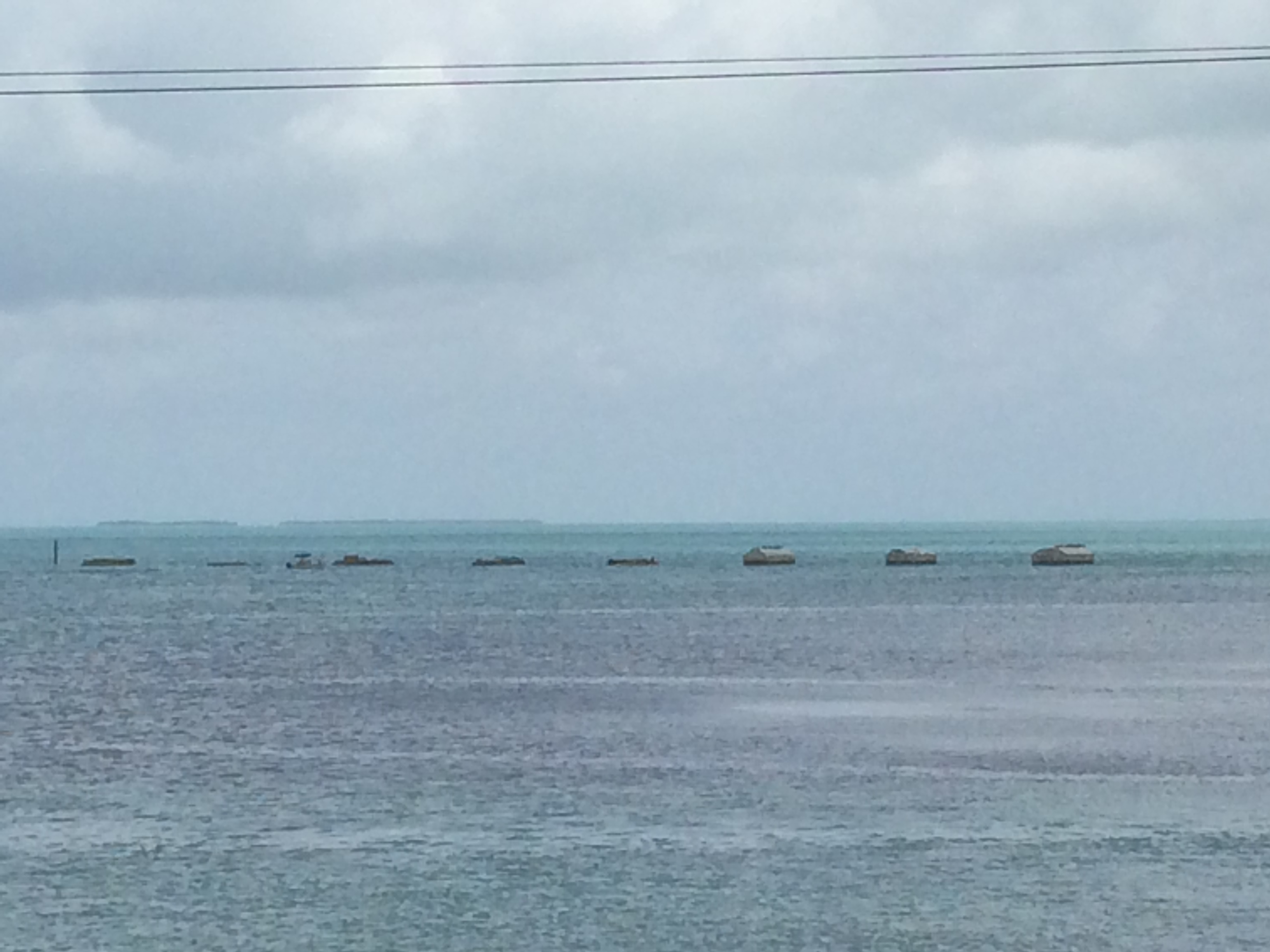
Eight bridge piers that would have carried the original alignment of the Overseas Highway to Long Key can be seen at Mile Marker 73. They serve as a memorial to the veterans who were killed in the Labor Day Hurricane of 1935.

Construction on a bridge connecting Lower Matecumbe Key with Long Key was already underway when the Category 5 Labor Day Hurricane struck Islamorada on September 2, 1935. The hurricane caused widespread damage throughout the area and destroyed much of the Overseas Railroad in the upper keys. Of the over 400 fatalities from the hurricane, more than half were veterans and their families. Their deaths caused anger and charges of mismanagement that led to a Congressional investigation. Just west of Lower Matecumbe Key at Mile Marker 73 on the current highway, eight concrete bridge piers and a small dredged island are all that remains of the veterans' work. The dredged island is now known as Veteran's Key and the piers remain as a tribute to the veterans with a memorial plaque on Craig Key.

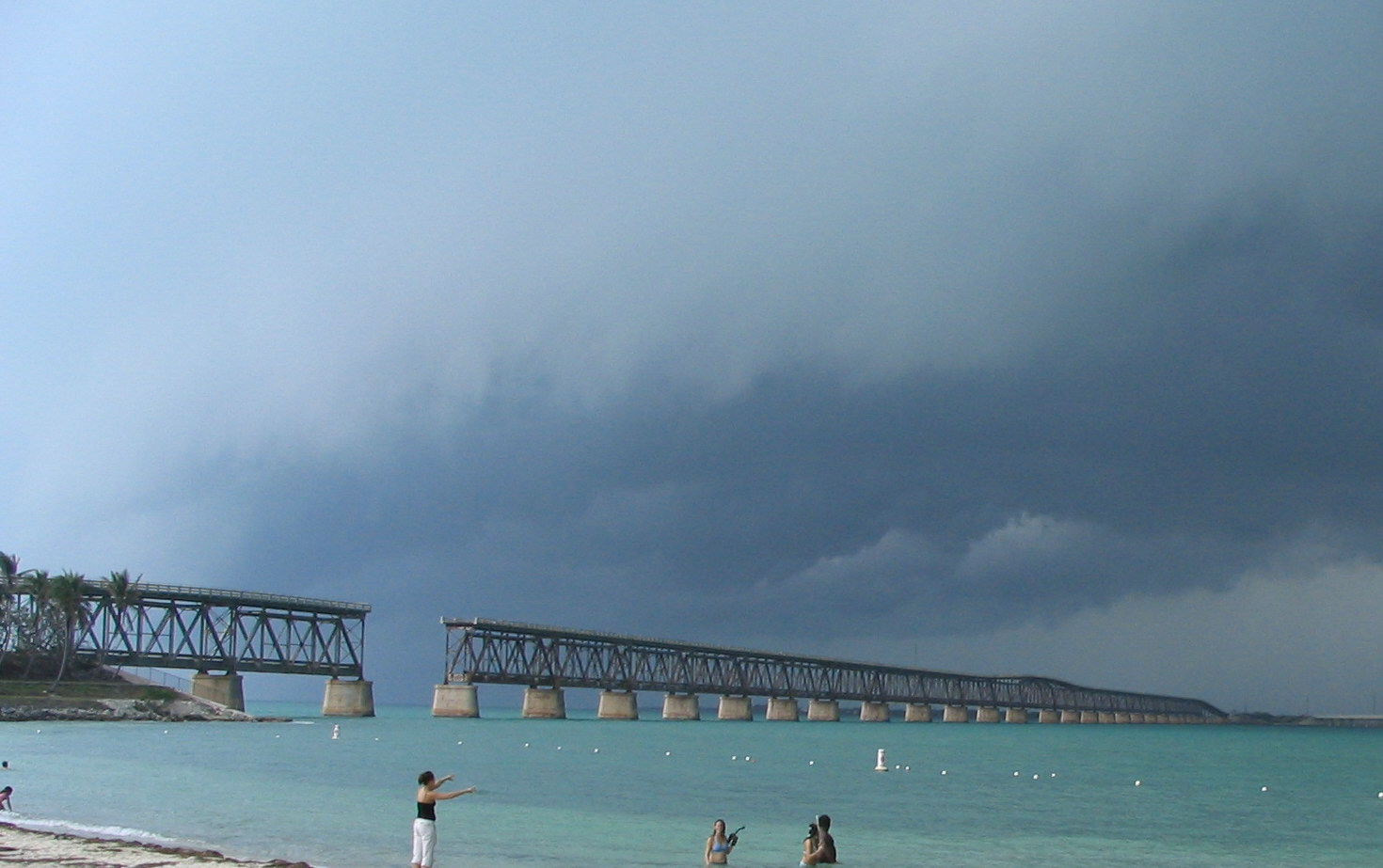
Many of the railroad bridges, such as the Bahia Honda Rail Bridge, were retrofitted to accommodate automobile traffic for the Overseas Highway. These bridges were replaced by more modern bridges in the early 1980s (the bridge pictured here in 2006 had been severed to prevent pedestrian access).

After the hurricane, the Florida East Coast Railway was financially unable to rebuild the damaged sections of the Overseas Railroad. Seizing a rare opportunity, the state abandoned its original plan for highway expansion and instead purchased the railroad's entire right of way south of Florida City and its remaining infrastructure for a price of $640,000. The Overseas Road and Toll Bridge District then made plans to build the highway on the old rail bed from Lower Matecumbe Key to Big Pine Key. The railroad's bridges, which withstood the hurricane and were in good condition, were retrofitted with new two-lane wide concrete surfaces for automobile use. In the case of the Bahia Honda Rail Bridge, which was a truss bridge, the concrete road surface was built on top of the trusses. The conversion of the railroad bridges to automobile use was accomplished by Cleary Brothers Construction Co. of West Palm Beach. This new stretch of highway would effectively connect the two segments of State Road 4A, with present-day Key Deer Boulevard connecting the new highway on Big Pine Key to the original highway on the lower keys.

The fully connected highway from the mainland to Key West was officially opened for traffic on March 29, 1938 and upon completion, the route became the southernmost segment of U.S. Route 1, which previously terminated in Miami (State Road 4A would remain as a hidden designation until the 1945 Florida State Road renumbering, when the hidden designation became State Road 5). President Franklin D. Roosevelt toured the road in 1939.

Portions of the road were tolled until April 15, 1954; toll booths were located on Big Pine Key and Lower Matecumbe Key. Pigeon Key, roughly the midway point of the Seven Mile Bridge, served as the headquarters for the "Overseas Road and Toll District." The toll for automobiles was $1, plus 25 cents per passenger.

=== 1940s–1970s: Further improvements ===
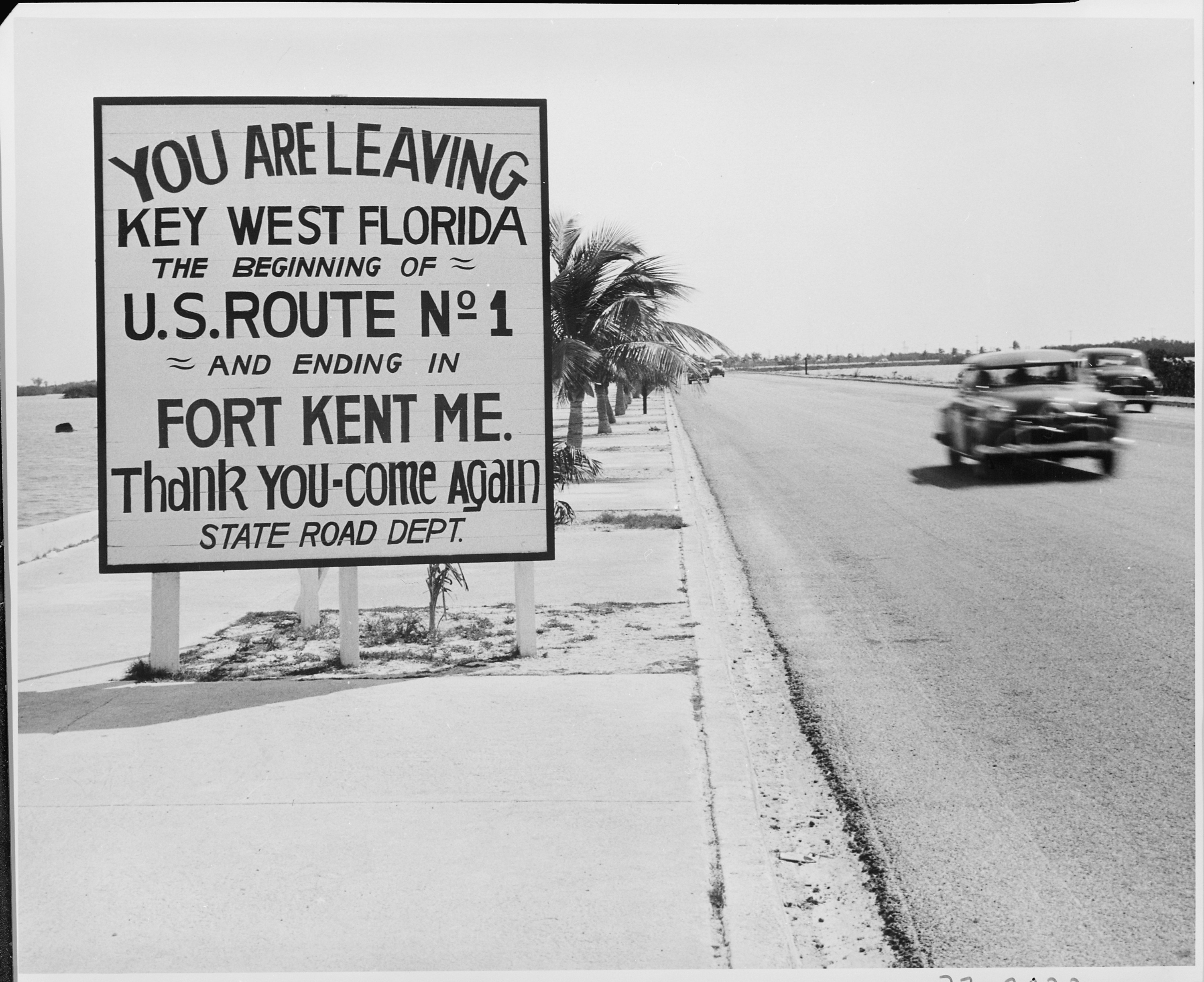
The beginning of U.S. 1 in March 1951; U.S. 1 has since been extended to the Monroe County Courthouse in downtown Key West

When completed in 1938, the original highway segments were still in use in the upper and lower keys. As the United States entered into World War II, the U.S. Navy sought improvements to the highway to improve their access from the Naval Air Station on Boca Chica Key to the mainland for national security purposes. The 1920s-era lower keys segment was less than ideal with its winding road and rickety wooden bridges. This resulted in relocating the rest of the highway on to the former railroad right of way in the upper and lower keys, which the state owned and was a more direct route with smoother curves that would allow for higher speeds. Also included in this project was the construction of the highway from Florida City to Key Largo on the old railroad route via Jewfish Creek. The new alignments would shorten the route from Key West to the mainland by 17 miles. The new alignments were officially completed on May 16, 1944, with Florida Governor Spessard Holland presiding over ribbon-cutting ceremonies.

After the completion of the realignments in 1944, the original Card Sound Bridge was closed to traffic and its remains were subsequently destroyed by a fire (the Card Sound route would be restored as a secondary route in 1969 with the opening of the current bridge). Today, some segments of the original highway remain as frontage roads for the current highway. In 1946, the State Road Department began removing some of the original highway's wooden bridges that paralleled the rebuilt highway. In the lower keys where the original road ran further south, many of the wooden bridges were left in service allowing some segments of the road to become side roads. However, the original bridges that connected Stock Island and Boca Chica Key, and Geiger Key to the Saddlebunch Keys were removed. Portions of the original highway are now Boca Chica Road and Geiger Road on Boca Chica and Geiger Keys. County Road 939A runs along the original road on the Saddlebunch Keys and Sugarloaf Key, though some portions of the road are now hiking trails. Remnants of the wooden bridge at Tarpon Creek on Upper Sugarloaf Key still remain, which was destroyed by a fire in later years.

=== 1970s–present: Modernization ===
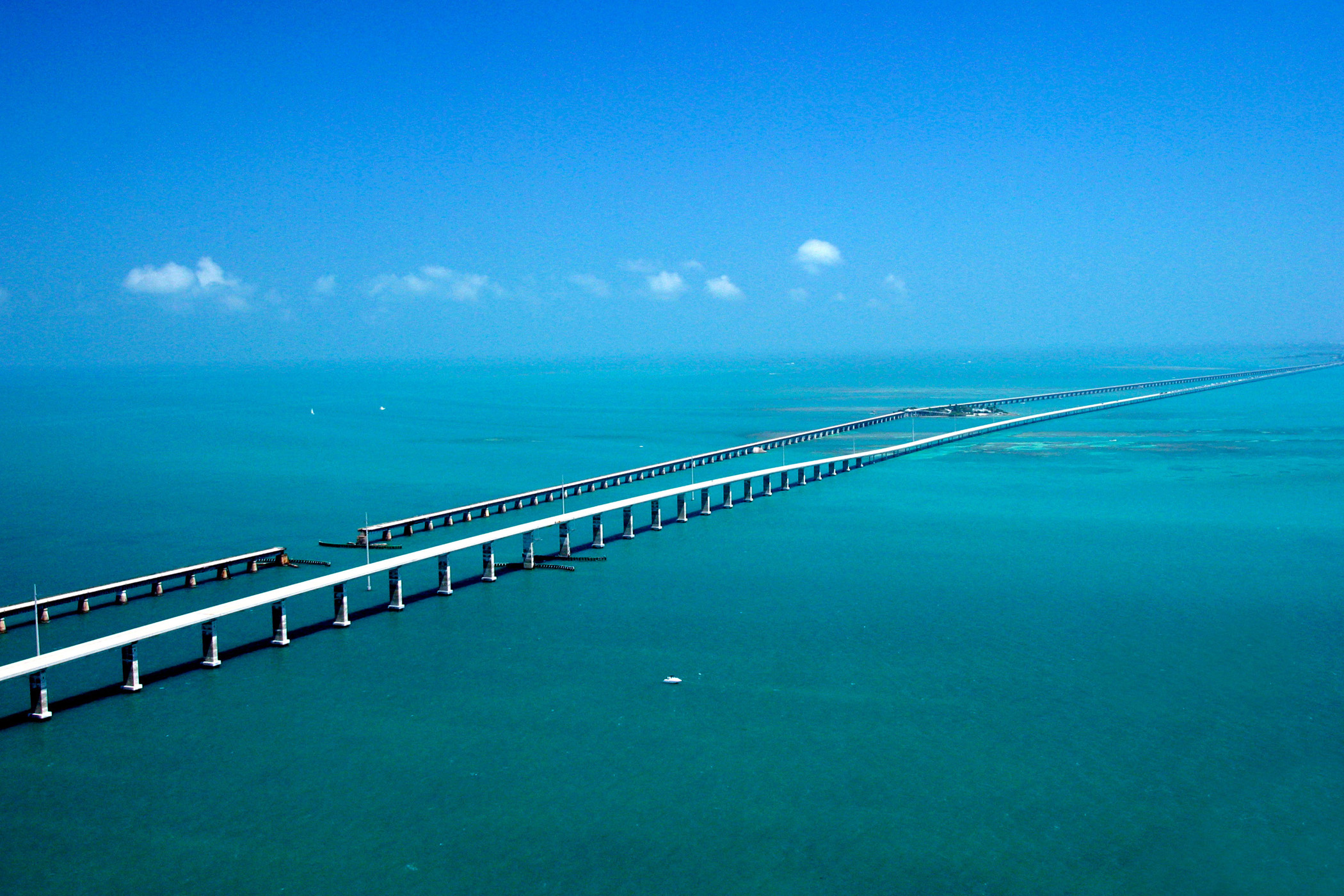
Seven Mile Bridge, the longest bridge on the Overseas Highway. The original span crosses over Pigeon Key.

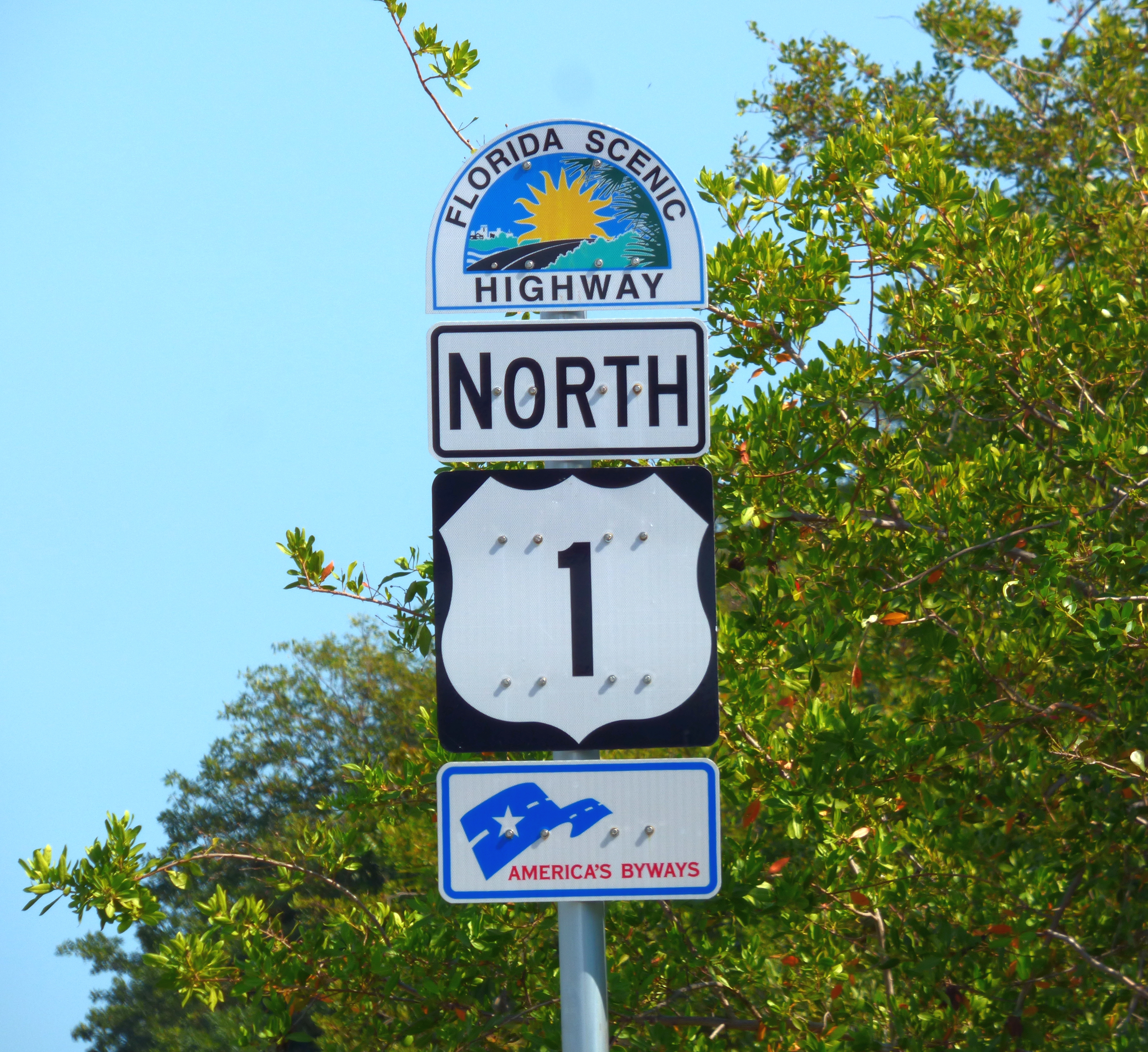
The 106.5-mile (171 km) portion of U.S. 1 in the Keys functions as a National Scenic Byway, named the "Florida Keys Scenic Highway".

The original highway through Key Largo and Tavernier would once again become part of the Overseas Highway in the early 1970s when it was expanded to a four-lane divided highway. Here, the northbound lanes run along the route of the original highway and the southbound lanes along the route of the railroad, which is especially evident in area where the route splits into two one-way streets. The widening was the beginning of a much larger project to rebuild much of the Overseas Highway, which included replacing the aging repurposed railroad bridges with more modern bridges; some of which are able to accommodate more than two lanes of traffic. This included the Seven Mile Bridge, the Bahia Honda Bridge and the Long Key Bridge (although these three original bridges are no longer open to vehicular traffic, they became listed on the National Register of Historic Places in 1979 and are currently used for fishing and pedestrian traffic). The more modern bridges were completed in the early 1980s.

In recent years, Pigeon Key was used by the University of Miami as an oceanography laboratory, but current efforts to restore the buildings on the island have resulted in the establishment of a railroad museum there. The newer Seven Mile Bridge does not have direct access to Pigeon Key; people going there must bike or walk on 2.2 miles (3.5 km) of the Old Seven Mile Bridge from its eastern end on Knight's Key, take a shuttle bus, or take a boat to reach the island.

== Trail ==
In 2001, the Monroe County Commission, the Florida Department of Environmental Protection's Office of Greenways and Trails, and FDOT entered into a Memorandum of understanding to create the Florida Keys Overseas Heritage Trail (FKOHT). The trail will be a multi-use bicycle and pedestrian facility that will traverse the Florida Keys from Key Largo to Key West. Upon completion, the FKOHT will include an integrated system of educational kiosks, roadside picnic areas, scenic overlooks, fishing piers, water access points, and bicycle and jogging paths. The development of the trail will provide a mechanism for the preservation and use of the historic Flagler Railroad Bridges, 23 of which still exist and are mostly intact. Several alternatives exist for trail alignment, including cutting down the 22-foot-wide (6.7 m), 1940s-era roadway to its original 12-foot (3.7 m) spandrel width, or using the 22-foot-wide (6.7 m) roadway as is, particularly in multi-use areas. In all cases, original bridgework will be repaired or rebuilt, and the breaks created during the 1980s and 1990s fishing pier conversion will be reconnected. Where the original roadway no longer exists, the trail will be temporarily cantilevered on the side of the current US 1 highway bridge, until new 12-foot-wide (3.7 m) trail bridge sections can be built. The new sections will be built to match the historical character of the original bridges.

== In popular culture ==
One of animated television's Wacky Races was The Overseas Hi-Way Race, which first aired on December 28, 1968, on CBS, covering the entire actual route from Key Largo to Key West. While Long Key was correctly portrayed, most of the other in-between keys were given fictional names, and Sombrero Key was actually five miles south of the highway in open water, according to the Florida Keys–East map.

The Overseas Highway is depicted in a screenprint by American artist Ralston Crawford.

Superboy features the bridge in the season 1 opening credits. Actor John Haymes Newton is shown flying around the bridge.

An action scene involving a car and fighter jet was filmed on a portion of the old Seven Mile Bridge for the 1994 James Cameron film True Lies. No part of the bridge was destroyed during filming; an 80-foot model of the bridge built off Sugarloaf Key was blown up instead.

== Major intersections ==
Mileposts are taken from US 1, which begins approximately 4 miles (6.4 km) south at an intersection with Whitehead and Fleming streets in Key West. The entire route is in Monroe County.

Location	mi	km	Destinations	Notes
Key West	3.927	6.320	US 1 south (North Roosevelt Boulevard) / SR A1A south (South Roosevelt Boulevard) – Business District, Airport, Beaches	US 1 continues south
Key West	4.100– 4.169	6.598– 6.709	Bridge over Cow Key Channel trail on sidewalk to north	
Stock Island	4.586	7.380	MacDonald Drive	Former SR 4A
	5.291	8.515	Key Haven Boulevard	To Raccoon Key
	5.997– 6.498	9.651– 10.458	Bridge over Boca Chica Channel	
Boca Chica Key	8.08	13.00	Naval Air Station Key West	Interchange
Rockland Key	8.790	14.146	Toppino Industrial Drive	
East Rockland Key	9.183	14.779	Rockland Drive – NAS Truck Entrance	Former US 1 south
	9.508– 9.754	15.302– 15.698	Bridge over Rockland Channel (trail on old bridge to south)	
Big Coppitt Key	10.691	17.205	CR 941 south / Boca Chica Road	Northern terminus of CR 941 (former SR 941)
	11.181	17.994	Shark Key	
	11.309– 11.701	18.200– 18.831	Bridge over Shark Channel (trail on old bridge to the south)	
Saddle Bunch Keys	12.547– 12.712	20.192– 20.458	Bridge over Saddle Bunch No. 5 (trail on old bridge to the south)	
Saddle Bunch Keys	13.018– 13.185	20.950– 21.219	Bridge over Saddle Bunch No. 4 (trail on old bridge to the south)	
Saddle Bunch Keys	14.118– 14.259	22.721– 22.948	Bridge over Saddle Bunch No. 3 (trail on old bridge to the south)	
Saddle Bunch Keys	14.328	23.059	Blue Water Drive	
Saddle Bunch Keys	14.496– 14.616	23.329– 23.522	Bridge over Saddle Bunch No. 2 (trail on old bridge to the south)	
Saddle Bunch Keys	14.968	24.089	East Circle Drive	
Saddle Bunch Keys	15.261– 15.504	24.560– 24.951	Bridge over Lower Sugarloaf Channel (trail on old bridge to the south)	
	16.370– 16.455	26.345– 26.482	Bridge over Harris Channel	
Lower Sugarloaf Key	16.955	27.286	CR 939 south / Sugarloaf Boulevard	Northern terminus of CR 939 (former SR 939)
	17.451– 17.472	28.085– 28.118	Bridge over Harris Gap Channel	
	17.658– 17.741	28.418– 28.551	Bridge over North Harris Channel	
	18.600– 18.755	29.934– 30.183	Bridge over Park Channel (trail on old bridge to the south)	
Sugarloaf Key	19.349	31.139	Crane Boulevard	
Sugarloaf Key	19.970	32.139	CR 939B south	Old SR 4A; northern terminus of CR 939 (former SR 939)
	20.150– 20.433	32.428– 32.884	Bridge over Bow Channel (trail on old bridge to the south)	
Cudjoe Key	21.409	34.454	Blimp Road	
	23.471– 23.682	37.773– 38.112	Bridge over Kemp's Channel (partial old bridge to the south)	
Summerland Key	25.197	40.551	CR 942 south / East Shore Drive	
	25.413– 26.278	40.898– 42.290	Bridge over Nile's Channel (partial old bridge to the south)	
Ramrod Key	27.264	43.877	Indies Road	
	27.504– 27.629	44.263– 44.465	Bridge over Torch Ramrod Channel	
Middle Torch Key	27.836	44.798	Middle Torch Road – Big Torch Key	
	27.895– 28.052	44.893– 45.145	Bridge over Torch Key Channel	
Little Torch Key	28.216	45.409	State Road 4A	Former SR 4A
	28.625– 28.801	46.067– 46.351	Bridge over South Pine Channel (partial old bridge to the south)	
	29.411– 29.552	47.332– 47.559	Bridge over North Pine Channel	
Big Pine Key	30.527	49.128	CR 940 north / Key Deer Boulevard – National Key Deer Visitor Center	Southern terminus of CR 940 (former SR 940)
	33.130– 33.791	53.318– 54.381	Bridge over Spanish Harbor Channel	
	35.272– 36.544	56.765– 58.812	Bahia Honda Bridge over Bahia Honda Channel (partial old bridge to the south)	
Bahia Honda Key	36.794	59.214	Bahia Honda State Park	
	38.361– 38.571	61.736– 62.074	Bridge over Ohio Bahia Honda Channel (trail on old bridge to the north)	
Ohio Key	38.75	62.36	no major intersections	
	38.896– 39.176	62.597– 63.048	Bridge over Missouri Ohio Channel (trail on old bridge to the north)	
	39.448– 39.620	63.485– 63.762	Bridge over Little Duck Missouri Channel (trail on old bridge to the north)	
Little Duck Key	39.823	64.089	Veterans Memorial Park	
	40.011– 46.804	64.391– 75.324	Seven Mile Bridge over Moser Channel (partial old bridge via Pigeon Key to the north)	
Marathon	47.186	75.939	Knights Key	
Marathon (Vaca Key)	48.059	77.343	CR 931 north (20th Street)	Southern terminus of CR 931 (former SR 931)
Marathon (Vaca Key)	49.965	80.411	CR 931 south / Sombrero Beach Road – Sombrero Beach	Northern terminus of CR 931 (former SR 931)
Marathon	53.001– 53.081	85.297– 85.426	Bridge over Vaca Cut trail on sidewalk to north	
Marathon (Fat Deer Key)	53.610	86.277	Sadowski Causeway – Key Colony Beach	
Marathon (Long Point Key)	56.191	90.431	Curry Hammock State Park	
Marathon (Crawl Key)	56.459	90.862	Banana Boulevard	
Marathon (Grassy Key)	57.594	92.689	Kyle Avenue	
	60.498– 60.786	97.362– 97.826	Bridge over Tom's Harbor No. 4 (trail on old bridge to the south)	
Duck Key	61.051	98.252	Hawks Cay	
	61.418– 61.680	98.843– 99.264	Bridge over Tom's Harbor Cut (trail on old bridge to the south)	
Conch Key	62.846	101.141	North Conch Avenue	
	63.140– 65.446	101.614– 105.325	Long Key Bridge over Long Key Channel (trail on old bridge to the south)	
Long Key	67.404	108.476	Long Key State Park	
	70.735– 71.670	113.837– 115.342	Bridge over Channel No. 5 (partial old bridge to the north)	
Craig Key	72	116	no major intersections	
Islamorada	72.642– 73.000	116.906– 117.482	Bridge over Channel No. 2 (trail on old bridge to the north)	
Islamorada (Lower Matecumbe Key)	74.403	119.740	Gulfview Drive	
Islamorada	77.531– 77.703	124.774– 125.051	Bridge over Lignumvitae Channel	
Islamorada	77.966– 78.353	125.474– 126.097	Bridge over Indian Key Channel	
Islamorada	79.177– 79.318	127.423– 127.650	Bridge over Tea Table Channel	
Islamorada	79.708– 79.761	128.278– 128.363	Bridge over Tea Table Relief	
Islamorada (Upper Matecumbe Key)	80.425	129.431	Frontage Road	Former SR 4A
Islamorada (Upper Matecumbe Key)	83.509	134.395	Frontage Road	Former SR 4A
Islamorada	83.879– 84.001	134.990– 135.187	Bridge over Whale Harbor Channel	
Islamorada	85.578– 85.739	137.724– 137.984	Snake Creek Bridge over Snake Creek	
Islamorada (Plantation Key)	90.513	145.667	Plantation Avenue / Sunshine Boulevard / Bessie Road	
	90.895– 90.955	146.281– 146.378	Bridge over Tavernier Creek Waterway	
Tavernier	91.485	147.231	Ocean Boulevard	
Key Largo	103.430– 103.454	166.454– 166.493	Bridge over Marvin D. Adams Waterway	
Key Largo	106.312	171.093	CR 905 north – Dagny Johnson Key Largo Hammock Botanical State Park	Old SR 4A; Southern terminus of CR 905 (former SR 905)
	112.865	181.639	US 1 north (Dixie Highway)	Monroe–Miami-Dade county line; US 1 continues north to mainland Florida
1.000 mi = 1.609 km; 1.000 km = 0.621 mi
