= Summerland Key =

- Unincorporated community
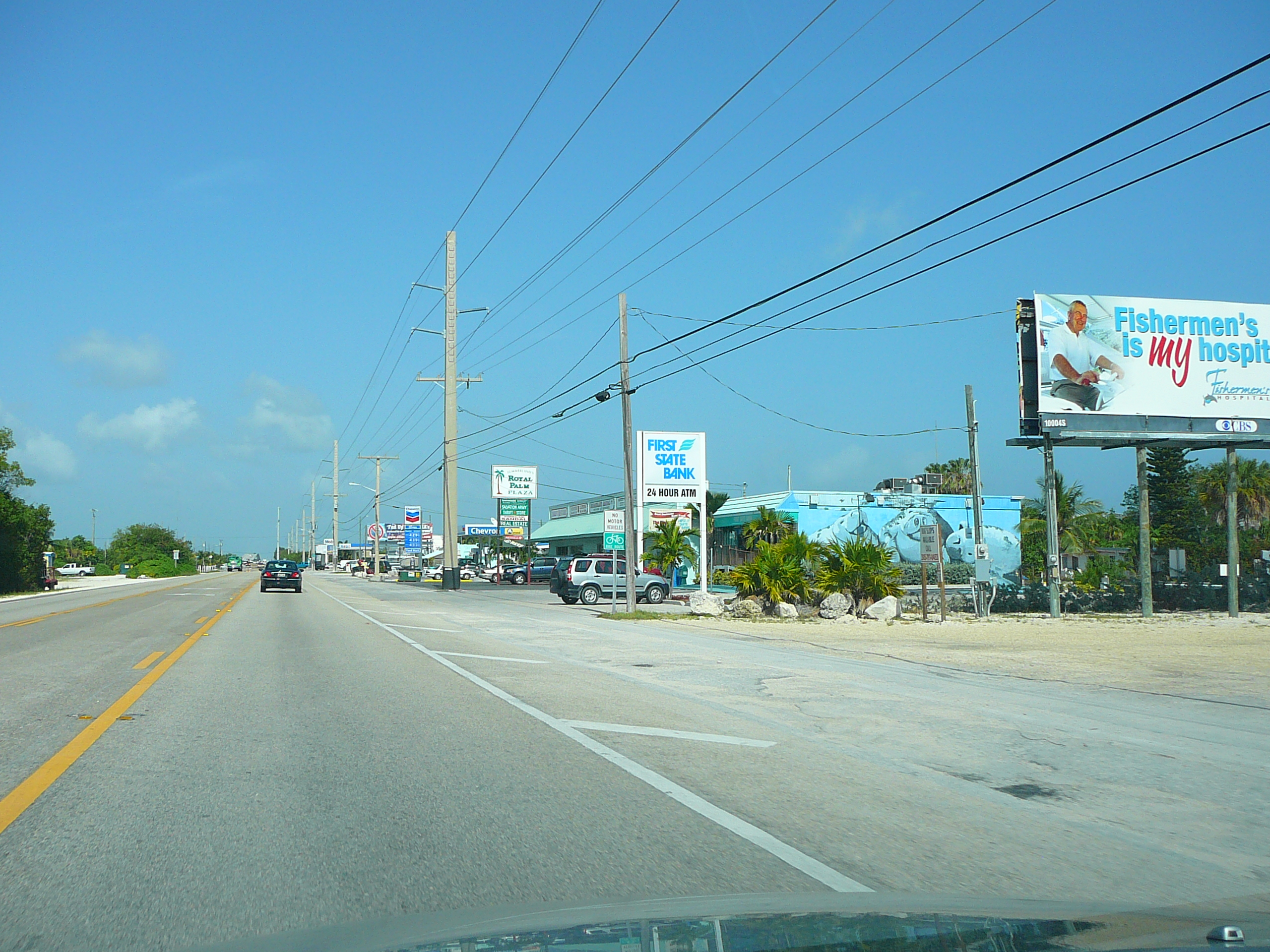
- The Overseas Highway as it goes through Summerland Key

- Location within Florida Location within the United States
- Coordinates: 24.657°N 81.441°W
- Country: United States
- State: Florida
- County: Monroe
- Elevation: 0 ft (0 m)
- Time zone: UTC-5 (Eastern (EST))
  - Summer (DST): UTC-4 (EDT)
- ZIP code: 33042
- Area codes: 305 and 786

Summerland Key is an island in the lower Florida Keys about 20 miles (32 km) east of Key West; it contains an unincorporated community of Monroe County of the same name.

U.S. 1 (or the Overseas Highway) crosses the island at approximately mile markers 24–25.5, between Ramrod Key and Cudjoe Key. The name appears on United States Coast Survey chart #169 in 1878.

== Community ==
Summerland Key is a bedroom community located almost midway between the larger communities of Marathon and Key West.

It is home to the Brinton Environmental Center of the Florida National High Adventure Sea Base and is a field station for Mote Marine Laboratory. A private, 2550-foot community airstrip (FD51) is located just south of the Overseas Highway on West Shore Drive at mile marker 25.

Some commercial fishing has occurred on Summerland Key.

== History ==
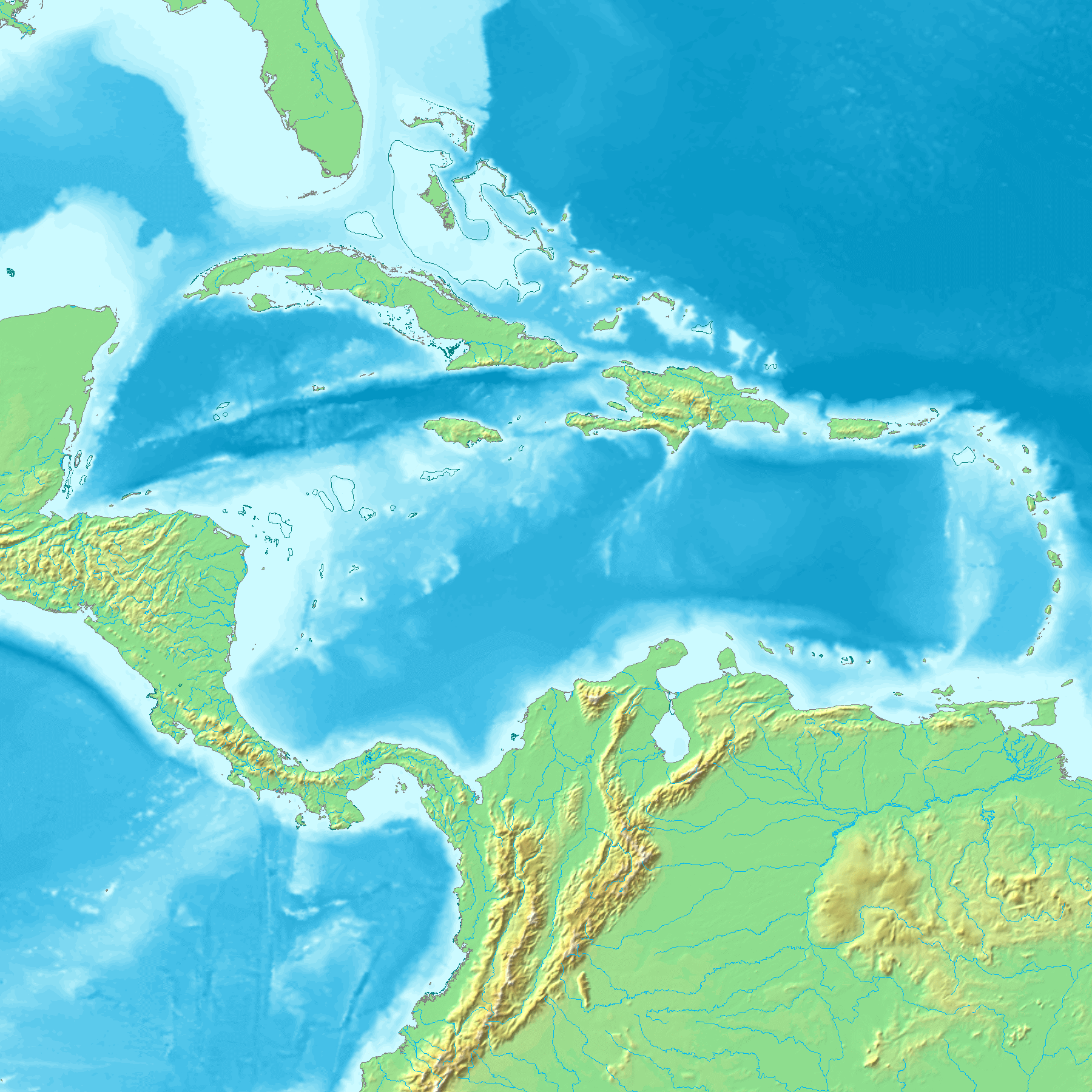

Beginning in 1948, Henry Hudgins, the father of modern Summerland Key, started developing Summerland from an uninhabited tropical wilderness to an upscale residential neighborhood.

While Hudgins was the chief structural engineer for the City of Miami, he met Waren Niles, whose family owned a large part of Summerland since the 1900s. In 1941, the Niles family notified Hudgins they were considering selling their Summerland property. By 1947, Hudgins had made an offer of $100,000 for the purchase of the Niles property and the family sold their Summerland real estate to Hudgins.

In the fall of 1948 two hurricanes hit the Lower Keys with tidal surges that rose six feet and caused much flood damage to the area. After Hudgins saw the high water mark on Summerland he decided that homes built in his development would have to be elevated. He purchased two surplus military buildings and had his construction crews secure them atop utility poles at the foot of what is Dobie Street today. This was not only the Hudgins family's first home on Summerland, but also one of the first homes in the Keys on stilts — if not the first in all the Keys. Building code today requires all homes be built elevated to be above the floodplain.

Hudgins drew up plans for streets and canals for the development and began dredging operations to form the canals. Unhappy with the results of the dredge, Hudgins developed a new technique that was later adopted for digging all the man made canal of the Keys.

During the development of Summerland Key, the nearest post office was on Ramrod Key and had been there since 1919. After years of serious effort to get a post office on Summerland, Hudgins got his chance. After the postmaster of the Ramrod post office retired, she suggested that it be moved to Summerland and Hudgins was named postmaster.

Hudgins' wife Mary learned to fly and kept a plane in Marathon. After Hudgins met Philip Toppino of Toppino Brothers construction on Rockland Key, who also liked flying, Toppino suggested that Hudgins build an air strip on Summerland. Around 1956, Hudgins and Toppino formed a partnership and developed a section of Summerland, named Summerland Cove, with a landing strip flanked by homes on both sides and canals behind the homes.

As property began to sell in his development, Hudgins moved his family to a small wooden home on Center Street to be closer to the post office. The home still stands there today.

In the late 1950s, Hudgins purchased the property to build his dream home, Hermitage, on property facing Niles Channel once owned by the Garibaldi Niles homestead. Designed by Hudgins, the home sat on concrete pillars with a porch facing the channel. The home was designed to withstand 150 mph winds and Hermitage still stands today. Hudgins was only able to enjoy his creation for a few years; he died in 1962.

Lasting legacies to Hudgins include his airstrip off West Shore Drive, Henry Street (named for him), Dobie Street (named for his second wife), and Hermitage — Hudgins's dream home on Niles channel.

Summerland Key was also home to singer-songwriter Fred Neil, composer of "The Dolphins" and "Everybody's Talkin'." Neil died here in July 2001.
