= Marathon Shores =

Neighborhood in Marathon, Florida

Marathon Shores is a neighborhood within the city of Marathon in Monroe County, Florida, United States. It is located in the middle Florida Keys on the island of Key Vaca.

== Geography ==
It is located at 24.726°N 81.048°W, its elevation 3 feet (1 m).
