= Boca Chica Key =

Island in the lower Florida Keys

- Boca Chica Key Boca Chica Key (the Caribbean)

Geography
- Location: Gulf of Mexico
- Coordinates: 24.5774°N 81.6933°W
- Archipelago: Florida Keys
- Adjacent to: Florida Straits

Administration
- United States
- State: Florida
- County: Monroe

Boca Chica Key is an island in the lower Florida Keys, about a mile (1.6 km) east of the island of Key West at its closest point. Its name is Spanish for "small mouth". It is mostly covered by salt marshes and mangrove trees, and is the home of the largest Naval Air Station (NAS Key West) in south Florida. U.S. 1, the Overseas Highway, crosses the key at approximately mile markers 6.5—8, east of Key West., near the NAS and Boca Chica Beach (a.k.a. Geiger Beach) on Boca Chica Road.

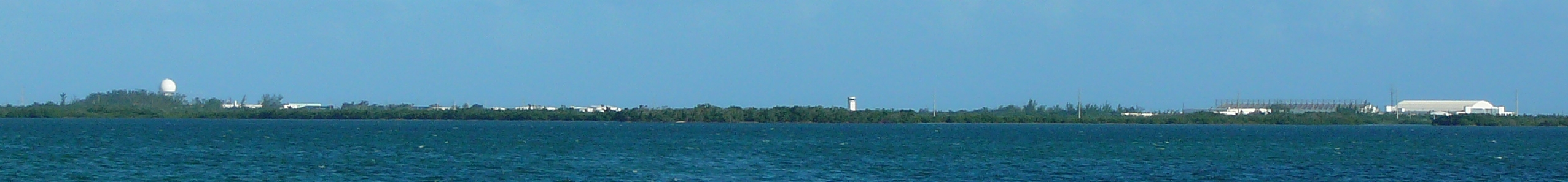
Boca Chica Key as seen from the northwest. Several structures of NAS Key West can be seen.

== Gallery ==
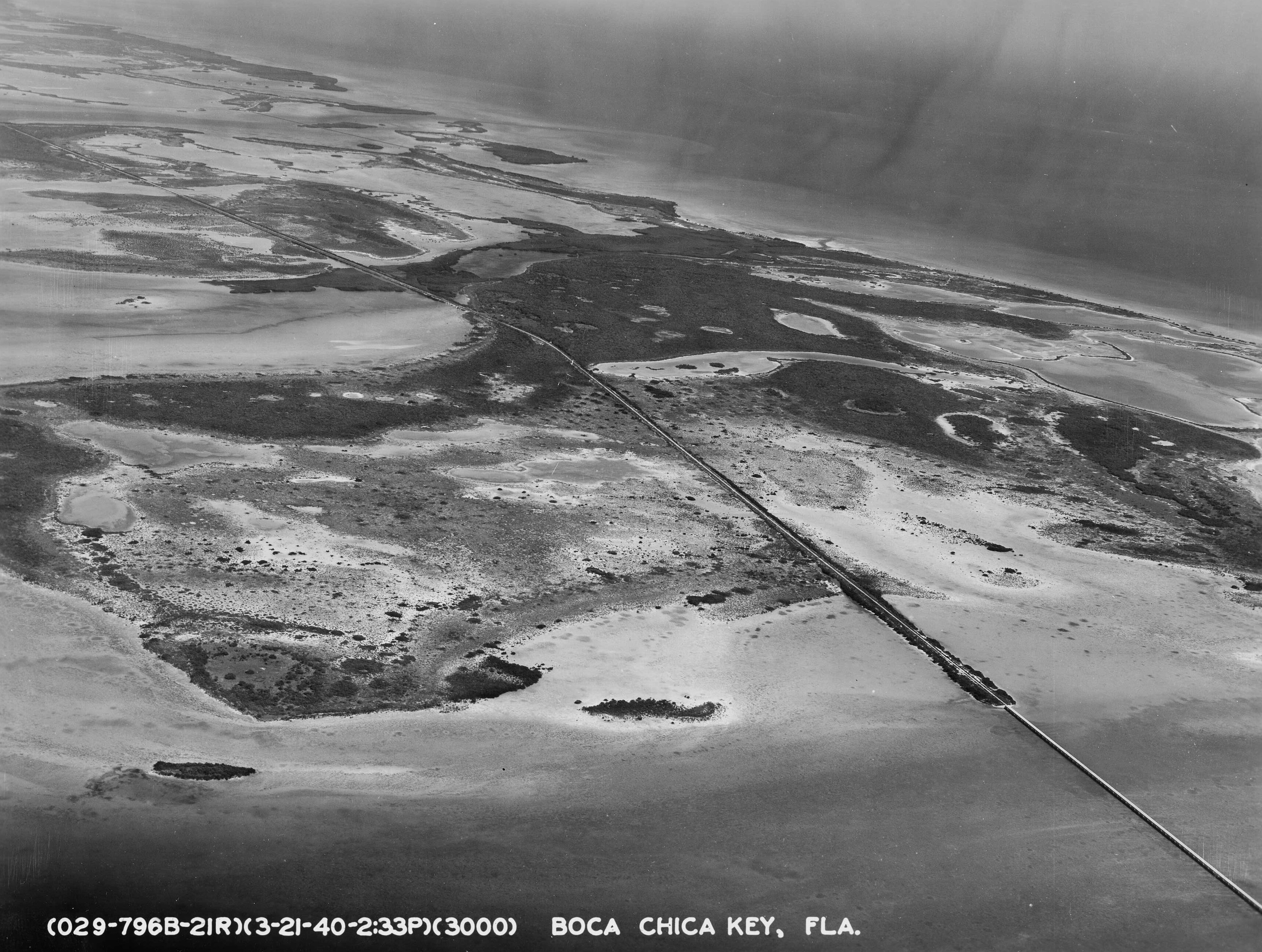
Boca Chica Key, April 1940

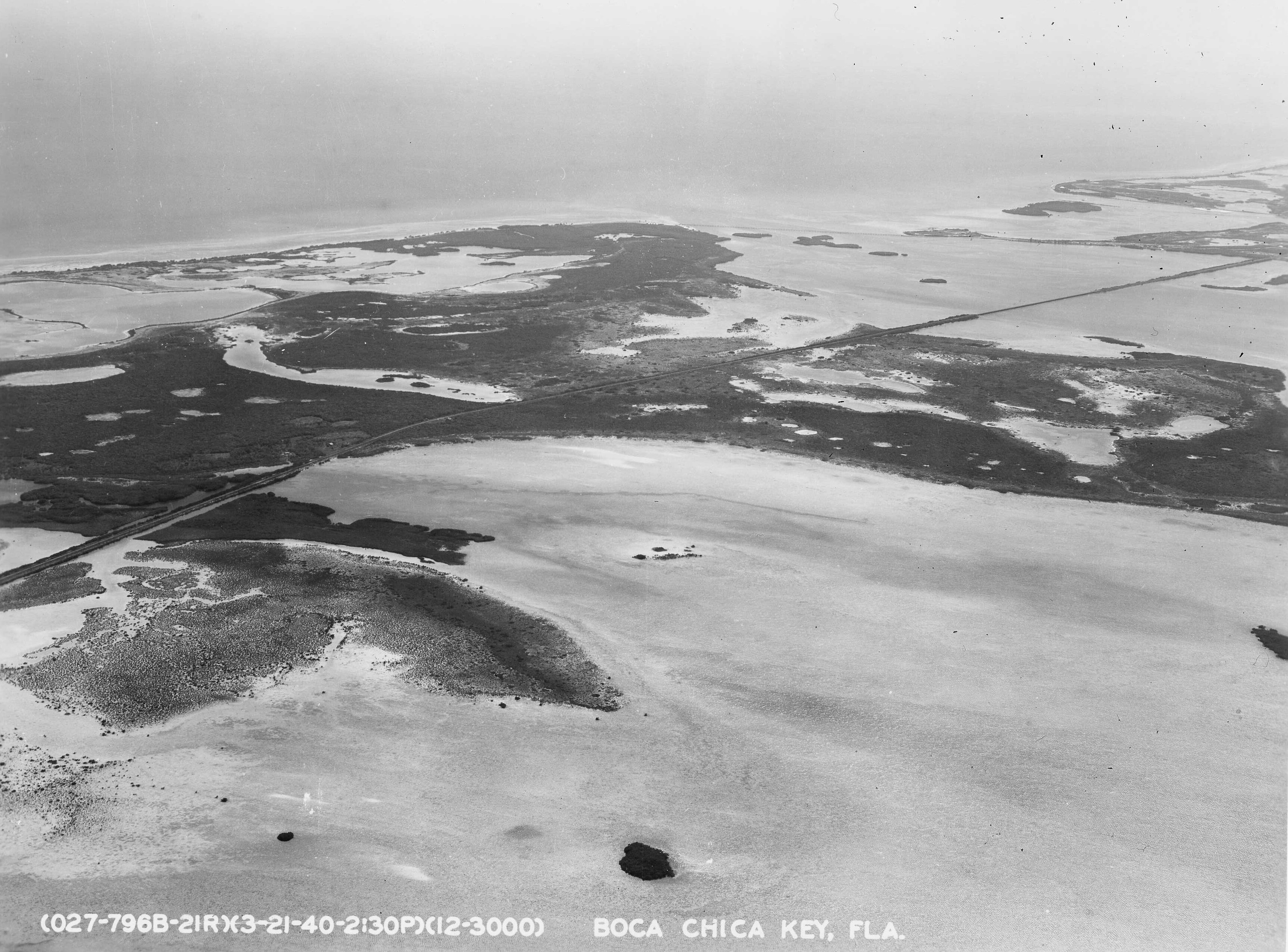
Boca Chica Key, April 1940
