= Boot Key Harbor =

Natural body of water located in the middle of the Florida Keys, Florida, US

Coordinates: 24°42′23.58″N 81°5′33.05″W

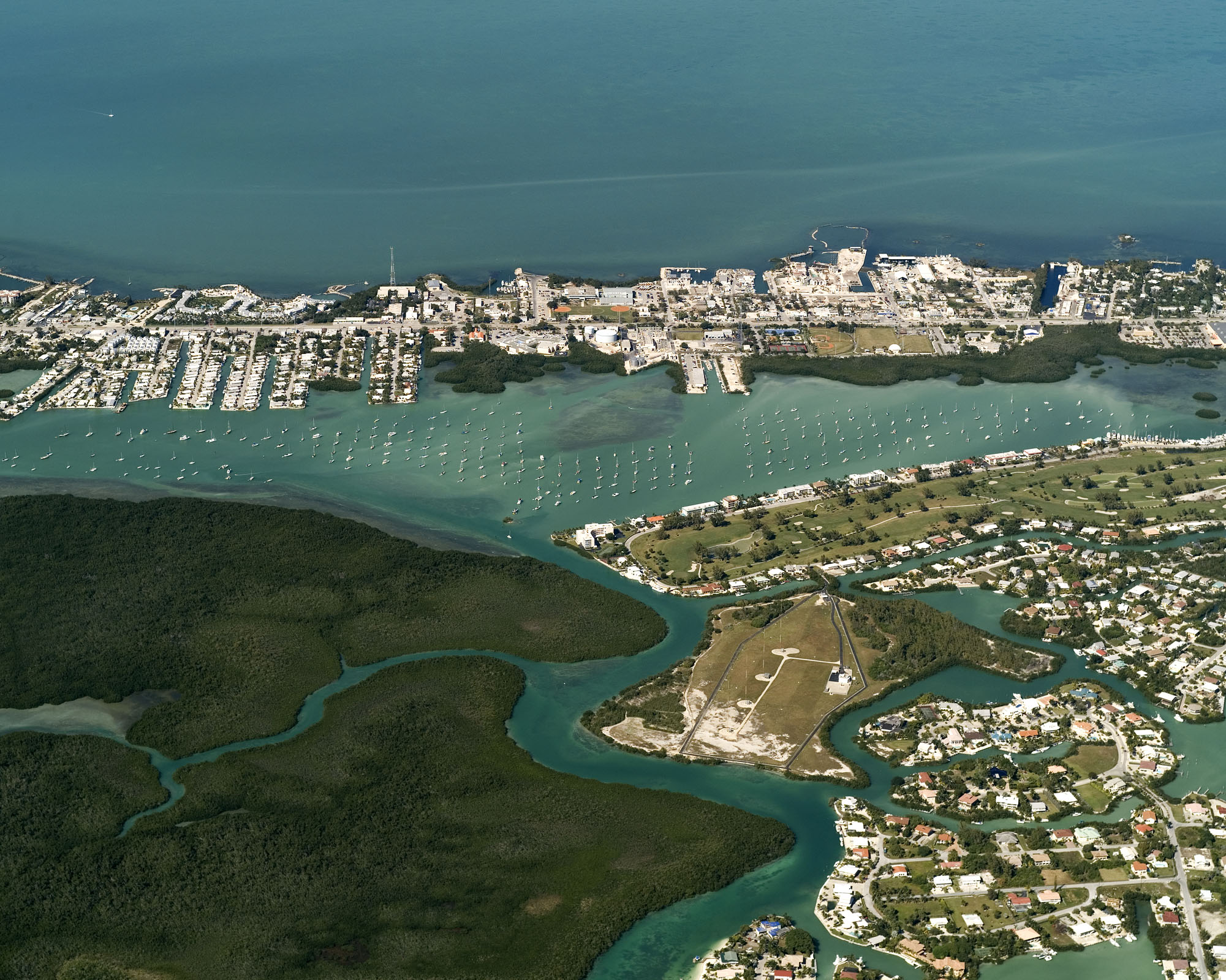
Looking north over Boot Key Harbor

Boot Key Harbor is a natural body of water located in the middle of the Florida Keys, entirely within the city limits of Marathon, Florida, United States.

Boot Key Harbor can be accessed by boat via two inlets from the Atlantic Ocean. The western inlet has a controlling depth of 6 feet (1.8 m) at mean low-tide, as does the rest of the main channel within the harbor. Sister Creek provides access from the south and has a low-point of 4.2 feet (1.3 m) at mean-low tide. Boot Key Bridge spans the west end of Boot Key Harbor connecting Key Vaca with Boot Key to the South. The bridge is currently closed to pedestrian and vehicular traffic, and the bascule section was removed on October 26, 2010.

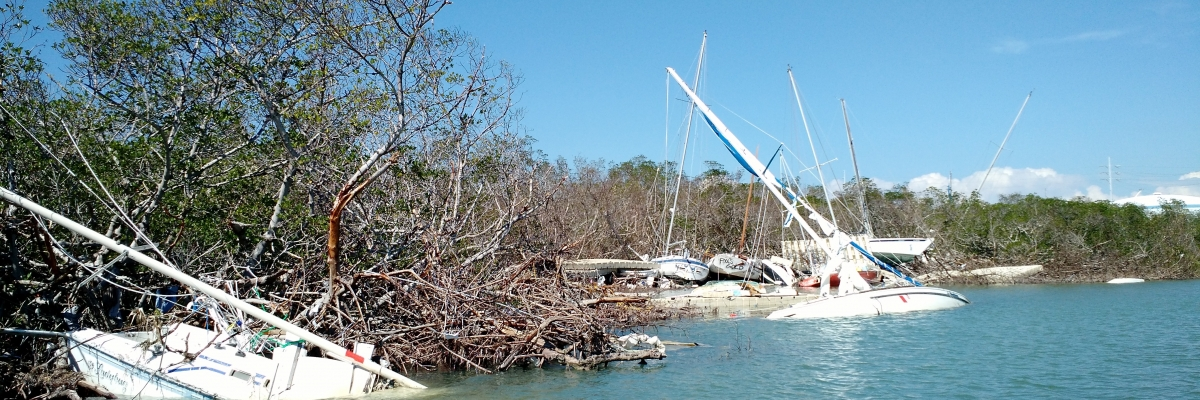
Derelict boats in Boot Key Harbor, after Hurricane Irma

Boot Key Harbor is well protected from severe sea conditions and is popular with recreational boaters seeking refuge from storms. One reviewer labels it as "perhaps the best managed municipal mooring field in Florida." However, in 2017, Hurricane Irma caused considerable damage. Over 200 boats were scattered or sunk, and one man, who tried to ride out the storm on his boat, was missing and presumed lost.

A large portion of Boot Key Harbor is occupied by a 226-buoy municipal mooring field administered by the City of Marathon, Florida. Prior to 2004 the harbor was "something like an elephant graveyard, where old boats went to die," and potential cleanup was mired in bureaucracy. Bruce Popham, a local boatyard owner, convinced Marathon to undertake the cleanup, and "authorities pulled out something like 200 wrecks from Boot Key Harbor." Following the cleanup Marathon installed the mooring field and began charging a fee for support services.

Since 1997 Boot Key Harbor has hosted an annual Christmas Boat Parade in December.
