= Stanley Switlik =

- Born: December 4, 1890; Galicia
- Died: March 4, 1981 (aged 90); Marathon, Florida, U.S.
- Occupation: Parachute pioneer

Stanley Switlik (December 4, 1890 – March 4, 1981) was a parachute pioneer.

== Biography ==
Switlik was born in Galicia, which is now part of Poland. In 1907, he immigrated to the United States as a 16 year old “steerage” passenger. He has worked at many jobs, including, but not limited to, home painting, insurance, and real estate. He founded a small canvas and leather making company and in 1920, agreed to buy it. He then made his friends and relatives the stockholders. The first products his company made were collapsible hampers, golf bags, coal bags, pork roll casings, and contracting-leather mail bags that would eventually be manufactured for the United States Post Office Department. As pilots of the time fascinated the public's imagination, the company started to make pilot and gunner belts, design flight clothing, and experiment with parachutes.

In 1934, With his partner George P. Putnam, Amelia Earhart's husband, he built the first parachute training tower in the United States. It was on Switlik's farm in Ocean County, New Jersey. It was originally made to train airmen. The first jump from this tower was on June 2, 1935 by Amelia Earhart. She described the experience as "Loads of fun!".

When World War II broke out, parachute makers were called to a meeting where they were ordered by the government to increase the rate of parachute manufacturing. Additional space was acquired and a large work force trained. The War Department was so impressed that they gave the company the first of five Army-Navy “E” Awards in 1942. After World War II, the company's equipment would not be used again until the Korean and Vietnam Wars.

Switlik then went on to create the Switlik Foundation in 1952.

In 1973, Switlik initially agreed to sell 800 acres (320 ha) of property he owned to the original company that eventually became Six Flags Great Adventure in Jackson, New Jersey. The controversy was how the property was to be utilized. It was his position that it would be used for a drive through animal park, but the plan of the buyers was also to include an amusement park. As a conservationist, Switlik believed the amusement park should not be built. In a long protracted legal battle which eventually went to the US Supreme Court, Mr. Switlik lost his case. A judgment of $4.8 million had been originally awarded, but the long battle increased the payment substantially due to interest on the original judgment. This resulted in the bankruptcy to him and his family. Great Adventure was built and now includes both amusement rides and a drive through animal park.

Switlik would retire and he died of a heart attack in Marathon, Florida on March 4, 1981.

== Legacy ==
The Stanley Switlik Elementary school in Marathon, Florida is named for him, as is the Switlik Elementary School in Jackson, New Jersey. Switlik Residents Hall at Rider University in Lawrenceville, New Jersey is also named after Stanley Switlik. He served on the Board of Trustees of Rider for 16 years and received an honorary degree in 1954.
