= Long Key Bridge =

Bridge in Florida, United States of America

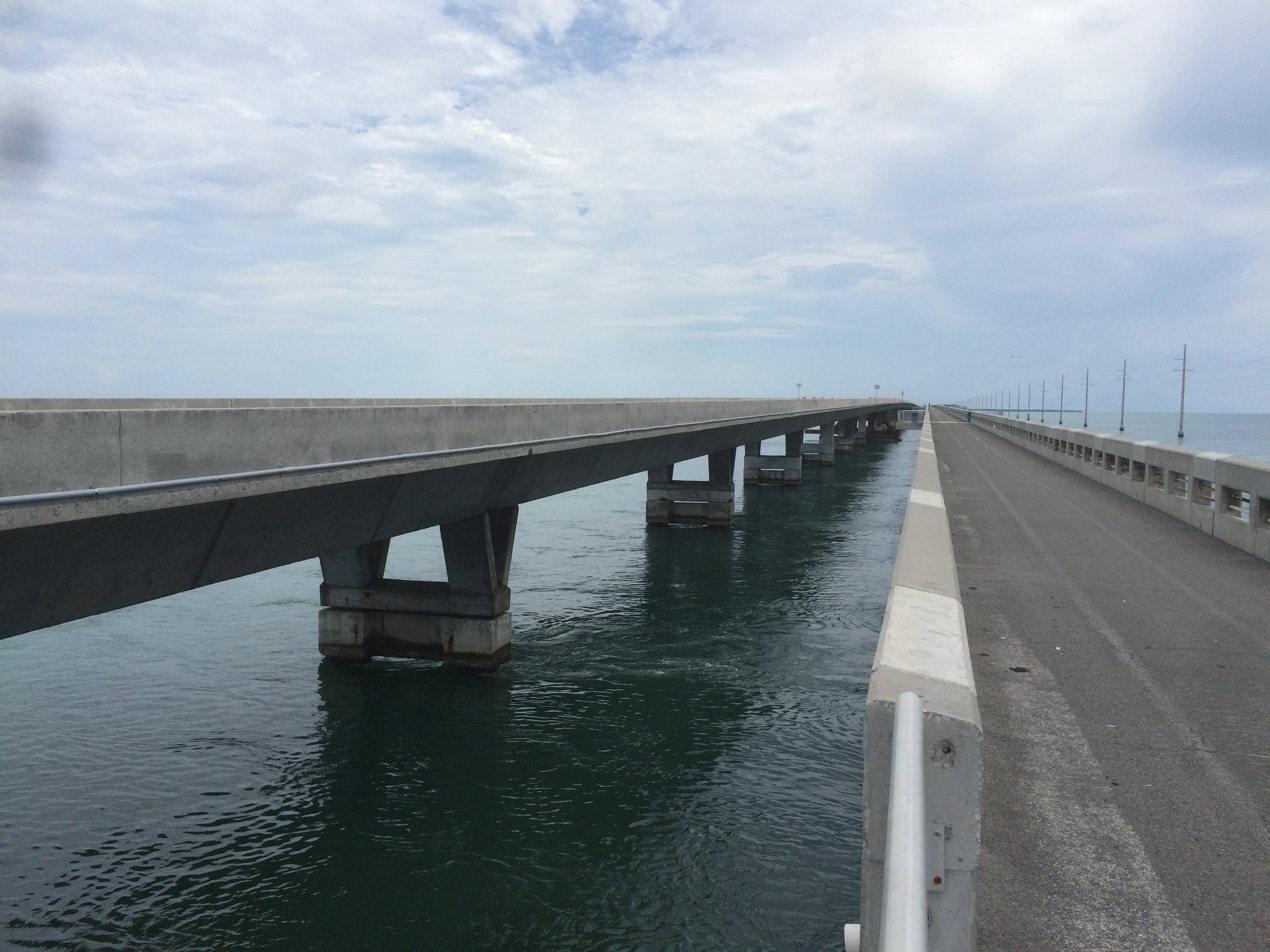
- Current structure with the original viaduct running parallel
- Coordinates: 24.797°N 80.868°W
- Carries: US 1 (Overseas Highway)
- Crosses: Long Key Channel
- Locale: Layton, Florida
- Official name: Dante B. Fascell Bridge
- Maintained by: Florida Department of Transportation
- ID number: 900092

Characteristics
- Design: precast segmented box girder bridge
- Total length: 2.3 miles
- Clearance above: 25 feet

History
- Opened: 1982

Location
- Interactive map of Long Key Bridge

The Long Key Bridge, officially known as the Dante B. Fascell Bridge, is a bridge in the Florida Keys connecting Long Key and Conch Key, roughly halfway between Miami and Key West. At a length of nearly two and a half miles, it is the second longest bridge on the Overseas Highway after the Seven Mile Bridge. The current bridge opened in 1982, replacing the parallel Long Key Viaduct, which carried the Overseas Railroad from 1907 to 1935 and was repurposed for highway use shortly after.

== Current Structure ==
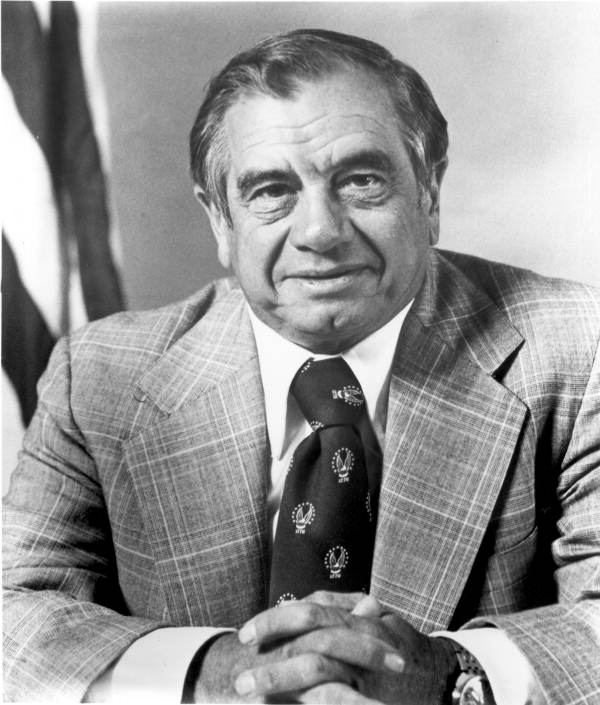
Long Key Bridge is officially named for former U.S. Representative Dante B. Fascell

Opening in 1982, the current bridge was built as part of a modernization effort for the entire Overseas Highway to replace the aging historic bridges originally built for the Overseas Railroad.

The current bridge is a box-girder structure built from precast, prestressed concrete sections. The bridge consists of 103 spans total, two of which are 117 feet long with the remaining spans at a length of 118 feet. The spans are supported by a series of V-shaped piers. This method allowed the superstructure to be pieced together in less than 12 months. Bridges built in the keys at this time were some of the first in North America to be built using this method.

The current bridge is officially named after U.S. Representative Dante Fascell, who served from 1955 to 1993. He is best known for championing legislation to create Biscayne National Park.

== Long Key Viaduct ==
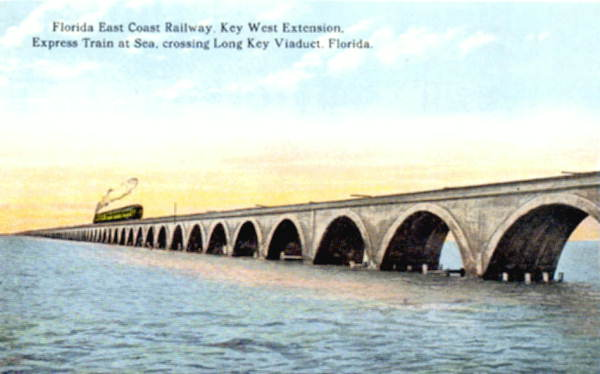
Postcard of a train crossing Long Key Viaduct

The current structure was built to replace the Long Key Viaduct, which still stands parallel to the bridge. The Long Key Viaduct was completed in 1907 by Henry Flagler as part of his Overseas Railroad, the Key West Extension of the Florida East Coast Railway (though the railroad would not fully reach Key West until 1912). The viaduct was built with a series of 186 concrete arches, a design used by most of the railroad bridges in the keys. The Florida East Coast Railway often used the Long Key Viaduct in promotional material for the Overseas Railroad.

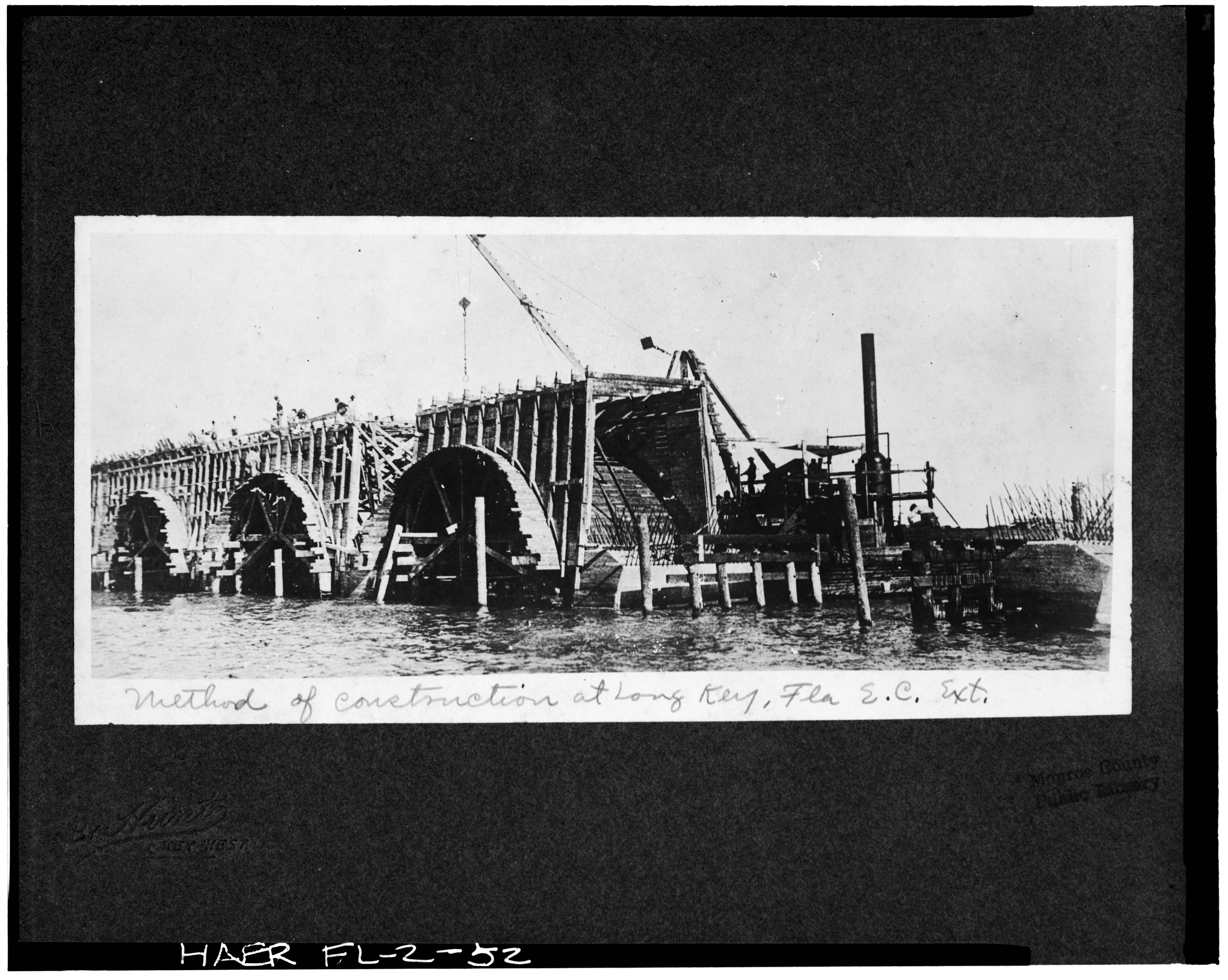
Long Key Viaduct under construction

Rail service was discontinued after the Labor Day Hurricane of 1935 struck the area, which irreparably destroyed the railroad in the upper keys. The viaduct itself though was not heavily damaged. The Florida East Coast Railway then sold the remaining right of way and infrastructure to the state, who then built the Overseas Highway along the route. To accommodate the highway, the tracks on the bridge were replaced by a new two-lane wide reinforced concrete surface for automobile traffic.

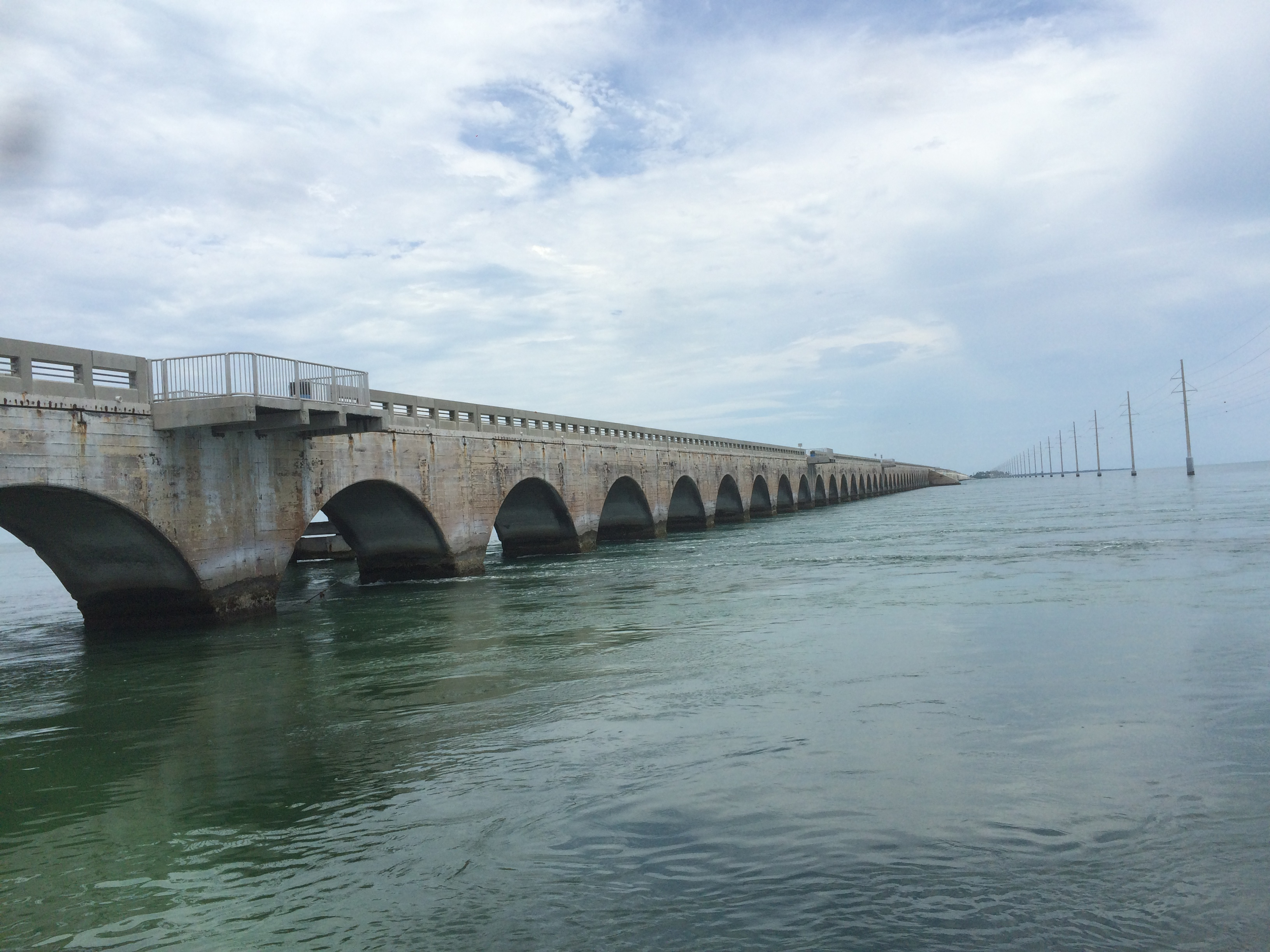
Long Key Viaduct as of 2015

The Long Key Viaduct was listed on the National Register of Historic Places on August 13, 1979, along with the original Seven Mile Bridge and the Bahia Honda Rail Bridge. The viaduct was replaced by the current highway bridge shortly after in 1982.

After discontinuation of automobile traffic, the viaduct was repurposed again as a bike path and fishing pier. For the most part, the deck of the viaduct was reduced to its original width from the railroad era. There are several fishing platform on both sides of the bridge. The viaduct is now part of the Florida Keys Overseas Heritage Trail, a multi-use bicycle and pedestrian path that will eventually run the entire length of the Overseas Highway.
