= Long Point Key =

Island in the middle Florida Keys, United States

- Long Point Key Long Point Key (the Caribbean)

Geography
- Location: Gulf of Mexico
- Coordinates: 24°45′10″N 80°59′06″W
- Archipelago: Florida Keys
- Adjacent to: Florida Straits

Administration
- United States
- State: Florida
- County: Monroe

Long Point Key is an island in the middle Florida Keys.

U.S. 1 (or the Overseas Highway) traverses the key between Crawl Key and Fat Deer Key, which is part of a long stretch of road known as the Grassy Key Causeway.

It is entirely within the city of Marathon, Florida.
