= Key Colony Beach, Florida =

- City
- City of Key Colony Beach
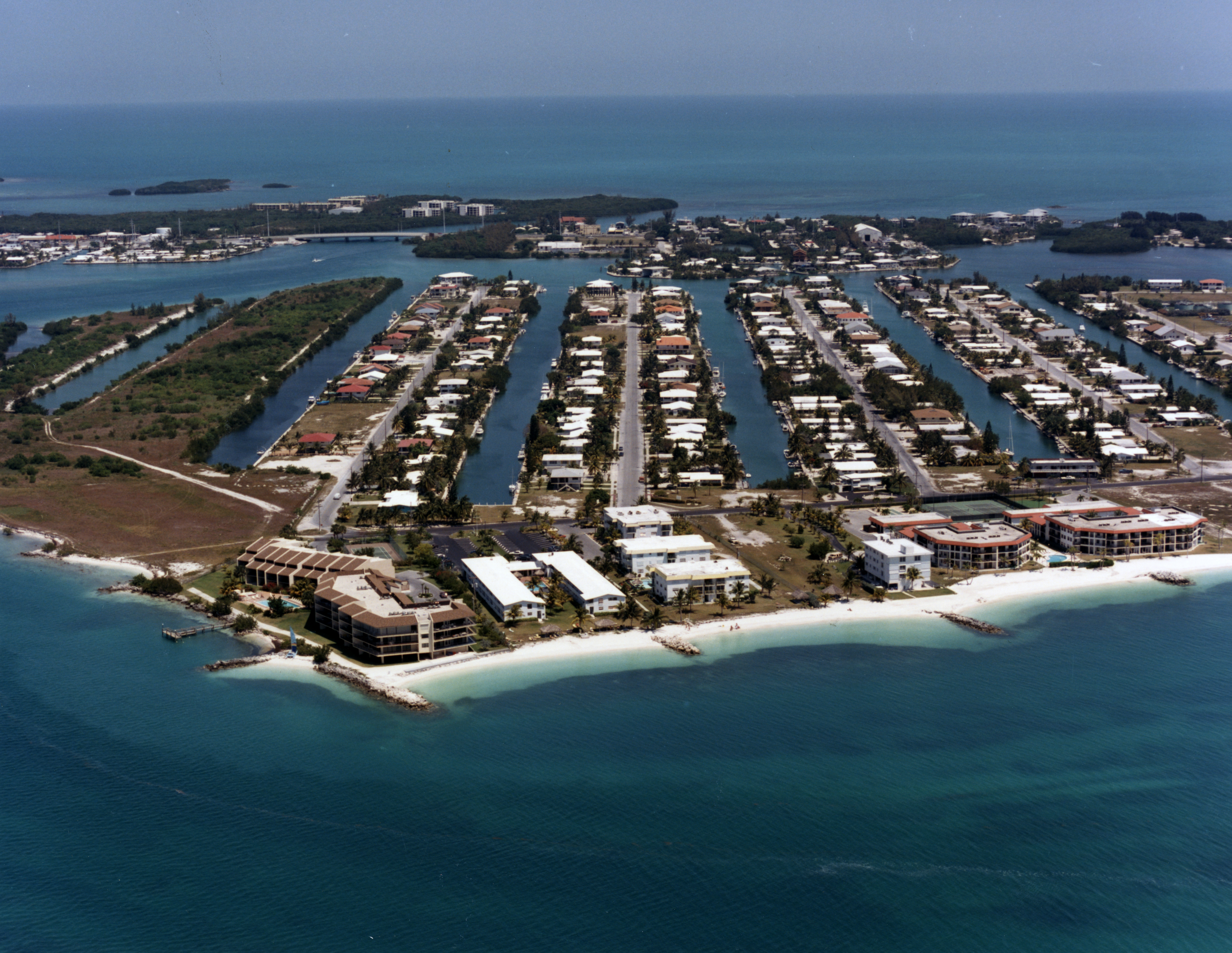
- Aerial view of Key Colony Beach, October 1987

- Seal
- Motto: "Gem of the Florida Keys"
- Location in Monroe County and the state of Florida

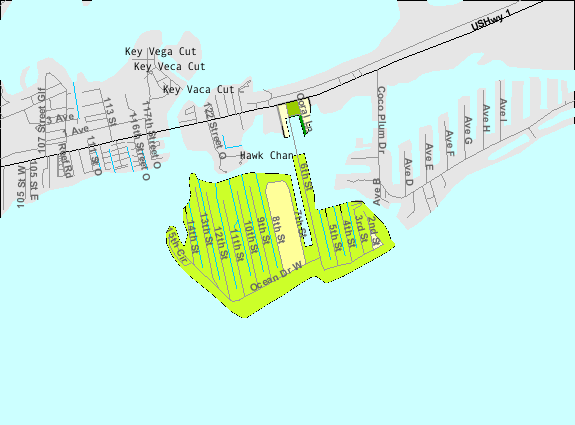
- U.S. Census Bureau map showing city limits
- Coordinates: 24°43′22″N 81°01′17″W
- Country: United States
- State: Florida
- County: Monroe
- Founded (Shelter Key): c. Early 1950s
- Incorporated (City of Key Colony Beach): September 24, 1957

Government
  - Type: Mayor-Commission
  - Mayor: Freddie Foster
  - Vice Mayor: Doug Colonell
  - Commissioners: Tom Harding; Kirk Diehl; Tom DiFransico
  - City Administrator: John Bartus
  - City Clerk: Silvia Roussin

Area
  - Total: 0.65 sq mi (1.68 km^{2})
  - Land: 0.44 sq mi (1.14 km^{2})
  - Water: 0.21 sq mi (0.54 km^{2})
- Elevation: 3 ft (0.91 m)

Population (2020)
  - Total: 790
  - Density: 1,795.4/sq mi (693.21/km^{2})
- Time zone: UTC-5 (Eastern (EST))
  - Summer (DST): UTC-4 (EDT)
- ZIP Code: 33051
- Area codes: 305, 786, 645
- FIPS code: 12-36325
- GNIS feature ID: 2404825
- Website: www.keycolonybeach.net

Key Colony Beach is a municipality in the middle of the Florida Keys, Monroe County, Florida, United States. The population was 790 at the 2020 census.

== History ==
Before the early 1950s, Shelter Key, on which most of the City of Key Colony Beach is located, (with a tiny part of the city being on Fat Deer Key), was a 97-acre (39-hectare) low-lying island. During the early 1950s, Phil Sadowski began dredging around the island, adding to its size and increasing its height to 6 feet (1.8 m) above mean sea level, and later built developments on the island via land reclamation.

Around 1956–1957, residents of nearby Marathon began discussing incorporating the entire area. Sadowski was not keen on having his development swallowed up into Marathon, so he began the process of incorporating the island into its own city. The Florida Legislature passed legislation in June 1957 allowing incorporation, which local residents passed unanimously on September 24, 1957, thus creating today's Key Colony Beach.

Incorporation became a blessing in 1960, when much of the city was destroyed by Hurricane Donna. As a separately incorporated city, Key Colony Beach received its own federal grant to rebuild; nearby Marathon (not yet incorporated) had to settle for a portion of the grant given to Monroe County. However, the storm (along with the Cuban Revolution) depressed real estate prices, and it took several years to for prices to stabilize.

== Geography ==
Most of the city is located on an island formerly known as Shelter Key; a small part of the city is on Fat Deer Key, where the Sadowski Causeway, the only road entering the city, connects to U.S. 1 (the Overseas Highway) and the city of Marathon, on the east side of the city. Marathon lies to the northwest, north, and northeast of Key Colony Beach, while the Atlantic Ocean is to the south.

Along the Sadowski Causeway are some charter fishing boats and a dockside restaurant called Sparky's Landing. At the south end of the causeway, West Ocean Drive branches off first to the right and East Ocean Drive soon after branches to the left. On West Ocean Drive is the police station, along with the post office and city hall. In the same vicinity is a small park with a fountain and a gazebo. The entire ocean-facing side of West Ocean Drive is lined by various condominium complexes, while the side facing Marathon houses the Key Colony Inn and a par-3 golf course. Starting at the far end of East Ocean Drive, streets are numbered one to fifteen east to west, and run from south to north toward Shelter Bay. The most notable buildings along East Ocean Drive are the Key Colony Beach Motel and the Key Colony Beach Club. At the tip of West Ocean Drive is Sunset Park, the place closest to where a woman was fatally struck by a spotted eagle ray. Many news reports were recorded from this park overlooking the shallows where the Vaca Cut meets the Atlantic Ocean.

According to the United States Census Bureau, the city has a total area of 0.65 square miles (1.7 km^{2}), of which 0.44 square miles (1.1 km^{2}) are land and 0.21 square miles (0.54 km^{2}), or 32.20%, are water.

=== Climate ===
The City of Key Colony Beach has a tropical climate, similar to the climate found in much of the Caribbean. It is part of the only region in the 48 contiguous states that falls under that category. More specifically, it generally has a tropical savanna climate (Köppen climate classification: Aw), bordering a tropical monsoon climate (Köppen climate classification: Am).

== Demographics ==
Historical population
| Census | Pop. | Note | %± |
|---|---|---|---|
| 1960 | 66 | | — |
| 1970 | 371 | | 462.1% |
| 1980 | 977 | | 163.3% |
| 1990 | 977 | | 0.0% |
| 2000 | 788 | | −19.3% |
| 2010 | 797 | | 1.1% |
| 2020 | 790 | | −0.9% |
U.S. Decennial Census

=== 2010 and 2020 census ===
Key Colony Beach racial composition (Hispanics excluded from racial categories) (NH = Non-Hispanic)
| Race | Pop 2010 | Pop 2020 | % 2010 | % 2020 |
|---|---|---|---|---|
| White (NH) | 755 | 645 | 94.73% | 81.65% |
| Black or African American (NH) | 4 | 19 | 0.50% | 2.41% |
| Native American or Alaska Native (NH) | 2 | 0 | 0.25% | 0.00% |
| Asian (NH) | 1 | 7 | 0.13% | 0.89% |
| Pacific Islander or Native Hawaiian (NH) | 0 | 1 | 0.00% | 0.13% |
| Some other race (NH) | 0 | 5 | 0.00% | 0.63% |
| Two or more races/Multiracial (NH) | 3 | 11 | 0.38% | 1.39% |
| Hispanic or Latino (any race) | 32 | 102 | 4.02% | 12.91% |
| Total | 797 | 790 | | |

As of the 2020 United States census, there were 790 people, 321 households, and 180 families residing in the city.

As of the 2010 United States census, there were 797 people, 336 households, and 202 families residing in the city.

=== 2000 census ===
As of the census of 2000, there were 788 people, 422 households, and 253 families residing in the city. The population density was 1,549.8 inhabitants per square mile (598.4/km^{2}). There were 1,293 housing units at an average density of 2,543.0 per square mile (981.9/km^{2}). The racial makeup of the city was 99.11% White, 0.51% African American, and 0.38% from two or more races. Hispanic or Latino of any race were 4.44% of the population.

In 2000, there were 422 households, out of which 8.3% had children under the age of 18 living with them, 55.9% were married couples living together, 3.1% had a female householder with no husband present, and 40.0% were non-families. 31.3% of all households were made up of individuals, and 16.4% had someone living alone who was 65 years of age or older. The average household size was 1.87 and the average family size was 2.25.

In 2000, in the city, the population was spread out, with 7.6% under the age of 18, 3.6% from 18 to 24, 14.3% from 25 to 44, 36.8% from 45 to 64, and 37.7% who were 65 years of age or older. The median age was 58 years. For every 100 females, there were 99.5 males. For every 100 females age 18 and over, there were 96.8 males.

In 2000, the median income for a household in the city was $45,577, and the median income for a family was $53,750. Males had a median income of $28,654 versus $27,143 for females. The per capita income for the city was $40,631. About 3.9% of families and 7.4% of the population were below the poverty line, including 10.2% of those under age 18 and 3.9% of those age 65 or over.

== Education ==
It is in the Monroe County School District. It is zoned to Stanley Switik Elementary School (K-5) as well as Marathon High School (6–12) in Marathon.

== Notable person ==
- Charley Lau, baseball player and coach
