= Fat Deer Key =

Island in the middle Florida Keys, United States

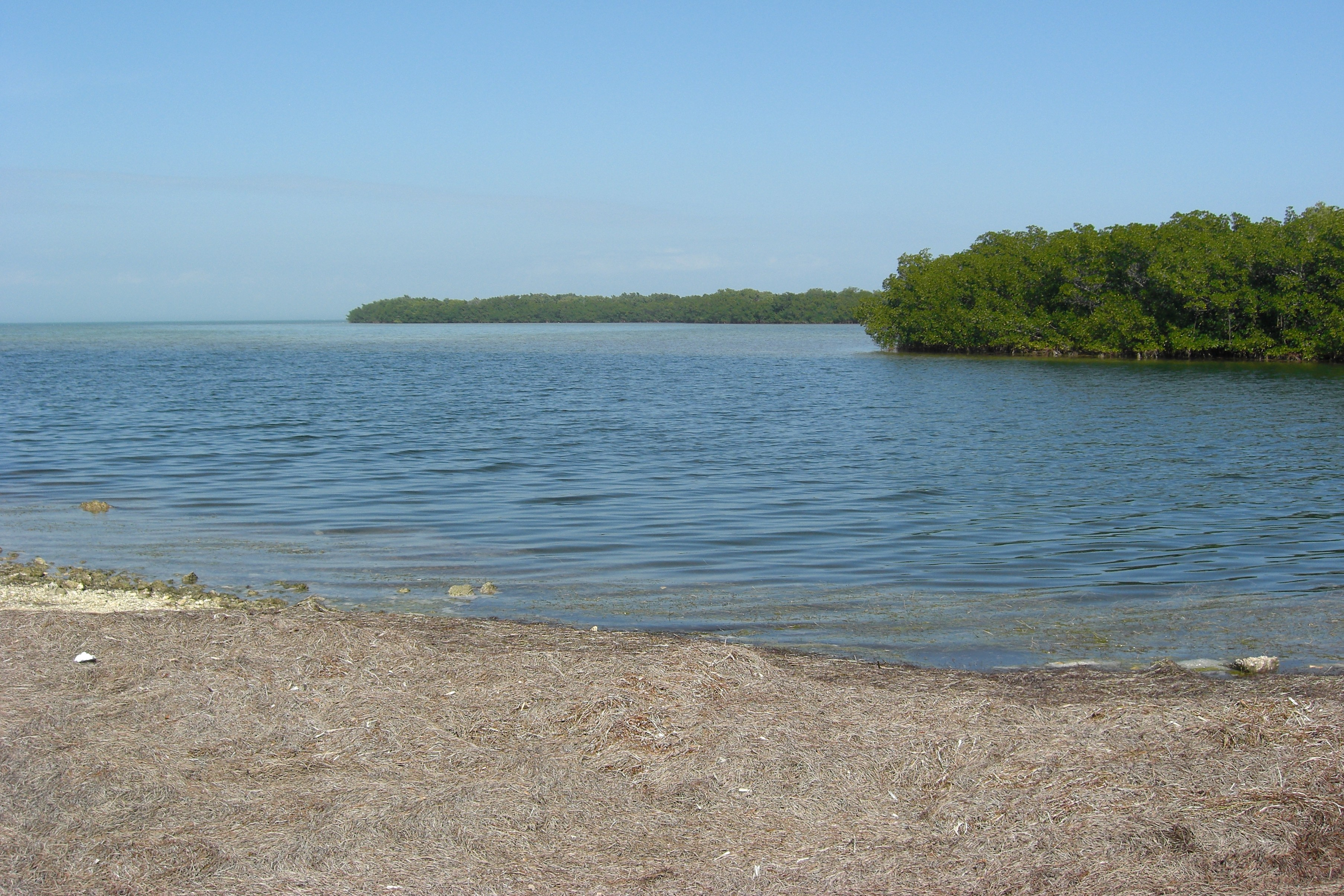
- Mangrove Beach in Fat Deer Key

- Fat Deer Key Fat Deer Key (the Caribbean)

Geography
- Location: Gulf of Mexico
- Coordinates: 24°44′20″N 81°00′07″W
- Archipelago: Florida Keys
- Adjacent to: Florida Straits

Administration
- United States
- State: Florida
- County: Monroe

Fat Deer Key is an island in the middle Florida Keys.

U.S. 1 (or the Overseas Highway) crosses the key near mile markers 53.5-56, between Long Point Key and Key Vaca.

It is entirely within the cities of Marathon, Florida and Key Colony Beach, Florida.

It has the only road leading to the city of Key Colony Beach, known as Sadowski Causeway.
