= Tea Table Key =

Island in the upper Florida Keys, United States

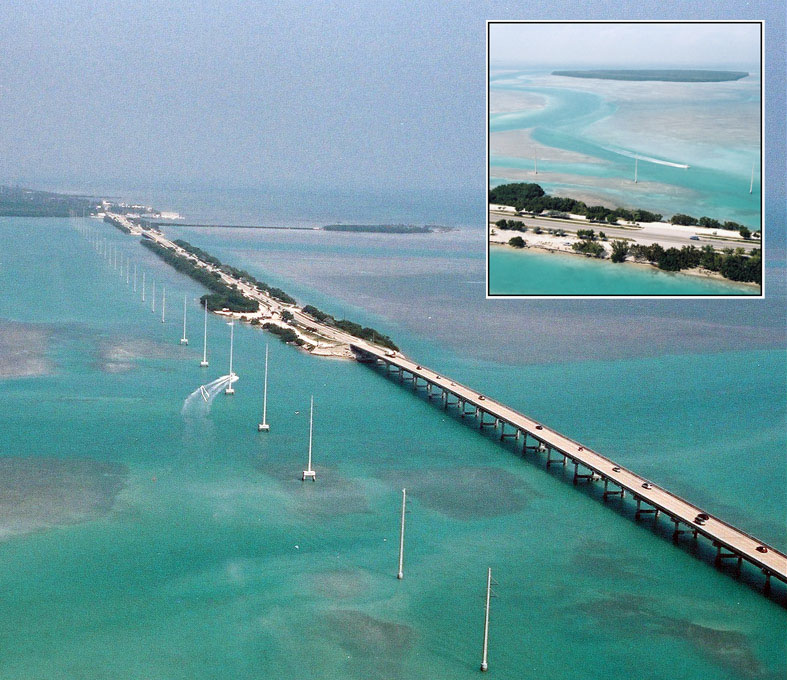
- Aerial view of the causeway and bridge just southwest of Lower Matecumbe Key. Teatable Key is in the upper left. A short road from US-1 leads to a private area.

- Tea Table Key Tea Table Key (the Caribbean)

Geography
- Location: Atlantic Ocean
- Coordinates: 24.896373°N 80.66219°W

Administration
- United States
- State: Florida
- County: Monroe

Tea Table Key also known as "Terra's Key" is an island in the upper Florida Keys. It is located on U.S. 1 at mile marker 79, and is incorporated within the villages of Islamorada.

The island lies to the southwest of Upper Matecumbe Key, and to the northeast of Lower Matecumbe Key. There is a small private beach on the island, as well as a private residence, pool and tennis court. The island hosted U.S. naval operations during the Seminole Wars and was taken over in an attack by indigenous tribes.
