= Key Vaca =

Island in the middle Florida Keys, United States

- Key Vaca Key Vaca (the Caribbean)

Geography
- Location: Gulf of Mexico
- Coordinates: 24°43′09″N 81°04′08″W
- Archipelago: Florida Keys
- Adjacent to: Florida Straits
- Highest elevation: 7 ft (2.1 m)

Administration
- United States
- State: Florida
- County: Monroe

Key Vaca is an island in the middle Florida Keys, located entirely within the borders of the city of Marathon, Florida.

== Geography ==
Key Vaca is located in between Fat Deer Key and Knight's Key. Vaca Key was also connected via bridge to Boot Key until the city of Marathon neglected the bridge so long it had to be torn down causing hardships to the business on Boot Key. Key Vaca comprises most of the north shore of Boot Key Harbor.

== Nomenclature ==
Various theories as to the origin of the name exist. The most likely example is that the island was named after Álvar Núñez Cabeza de Vaca, who wrote a detailed account of the 16th-century exploration of Florida. Other theories revolve around the word vaca, meaning "cattle" in Spanish. The 1957 book The Florida Keys indicates that the island's name comes from wild cattle that used to live on the island. Evidence of these cattle has never been found. The name may also refer to manatees, "sea cows" that thrived in the area prior to the 1950s.

Because it lies completely within the borders of Marathon, the island is often incorrectly referred to as "Marathon Key".

== Climate ==
Key Vaca is located geographically in the subtropics, but with a completely tropical climate. Because of the proximity of the Gulf Stream to the southeast, and the tempering effects of the Gulf of Mexico to the west and north, Key Vaca has a notably mild, tropical-maritime climate, (Köppen climate classification Aw, similar to the Caribbean islands). Cold fronts are strongly modified by the warm water as they move in from the north in winter. The average low and high temperatures in January are 64.2 °F (17.9 °C) and 75.8 °F (24.3 °C).

In the summer, temperatures are somewhat higher than in Key West, due to the island's proximity to the shallower waters of Florida Bay, which are heated more easily than the deeper waters of the Florida Strait, south of Key West. The season is characterized by hot, humid conditions and sharp, sudden thunderstorms that often drop substantial amounts of rain on the island. Hurricanes are a common threat during the summer, and sometimes affect the island directly, as was the case with the Labor Day Hurricane of 1935, Hurricane Donna in 1960, Hurricane Wilma in 2005 and most recently, Hurricane Irma in 2017. The average low and high temperatures in August are 79.7 °F (26.5 °C) and 91.6 °F (33.1 °C), with temperatures sometimes approaching the 100 °F (38 °C) mark.

== Transportation ==
U.S. 1, also known as the Overseas Highway, crosses the key near mile markers 47.5–53.5. Prior to the Labor Day Hurricane of 1935, Key Vaca was a major rail stop along the Key West Extension of the Florida East Coast Railway. It was home to a turnaround wye and several machine and repair shops. During the Great Depression and the construction of the Overseas Highway, Key Vaca was home to Camp No. 10, a home for several hundred World War I veterans working on the project.

Key Vaca is accessible by water, primarily through Boot Key Harbor, which lies on the south side of the island. Due to the shallow waters of the harbor, deep-draft ships cannot be unloaded there. Between 1906 and 1912, Key Vaca functioned as a temporary deep-water port with the addition of the Knight's Key Trestle 3 miles (4.8 km) to the west of the island. Built in order to provide a supply line for the growing Overseas Railroad, the trestle was dismantled and burnt when the railroad was completed.

During World War II, Key Vaca gained an airport. Originally intended to be a training field for pilots flying between Homestead and Miami, the airport was turned over to the county after the conclusion of the war.
