= Marathon, Florida =

City in the United States

- City
- City of Marathon
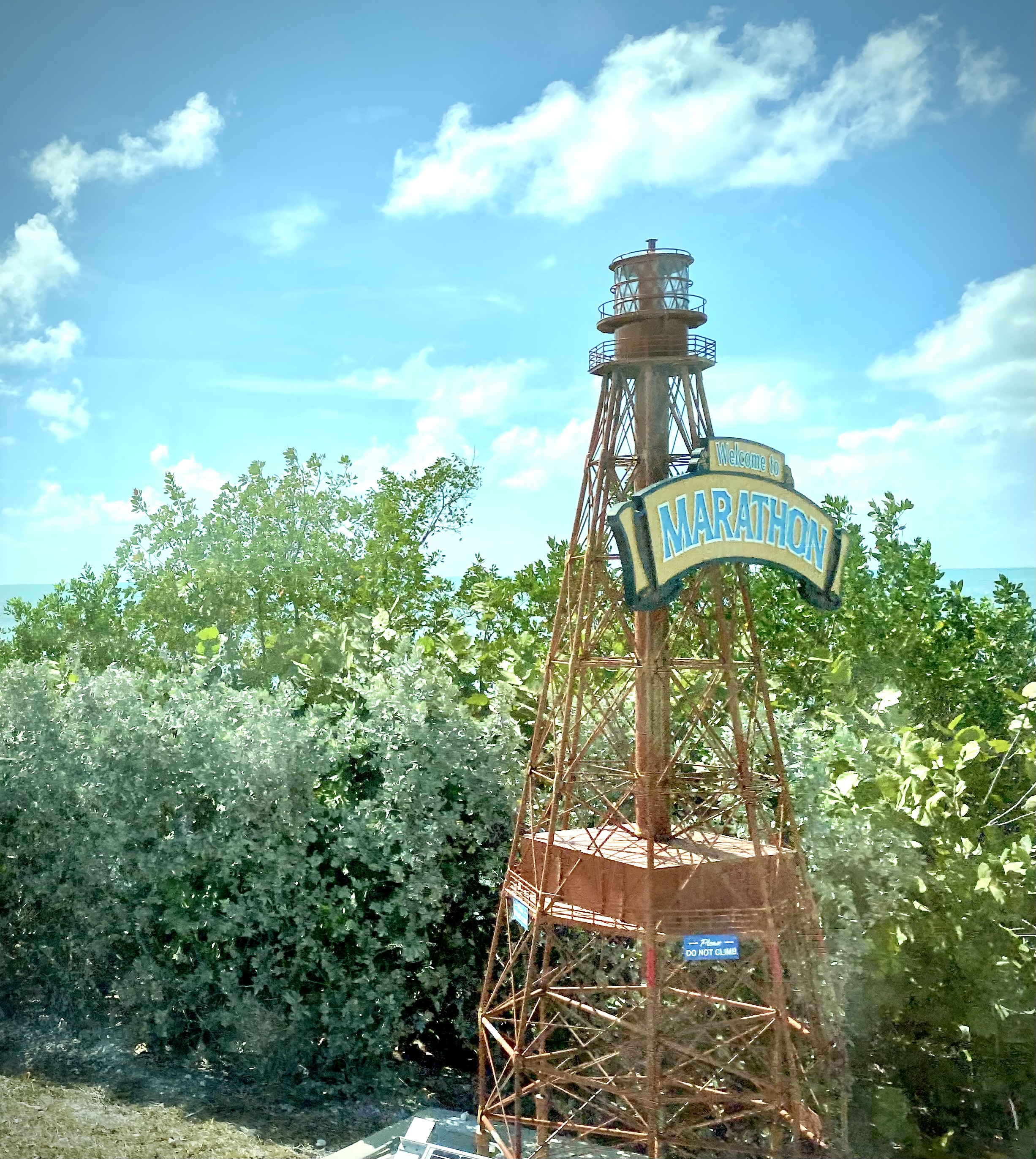
- Welcome to Marathon

- Seal

- Location in Monroe County and the U.S. state of Florida

- Location in the United States
- Coordinates: 24°44′20″N 81°00′12″W
- Country: United States
- State: Florida
- County: Monroe
- Incorporated: 1999

Government
  - Type: Council-Manager

Area
  - Total: 9.28 sq mi (24.03 km^{2})
  - Land: 8.45 sq mi (21.88 km^{2})
  - Water: 0.83 sq mi (2.15 km^{2})
- Elevation: 0 ft (0 m)

Population (2020)
  - Total: 9,689
  - Density: 1,147.1/sq mi (442.91/km^{2})
- Time zone: UTC−05:00 (EST)
  - Summer (DST): UTC−04:00 (EDT)
- ZIP Codes: 33050−33052
- Area code: 305
- FIPS code: 12-43000
- GNIS feature ID: 2405014
- Website: www.ci.marathon.fl.us

Marathon is a city in the middle of the Florida Keys, in Monroe County, Florida, United States. As of 2024, the city had a population of 9,914, up from 8,297 in 2010.

== History ==
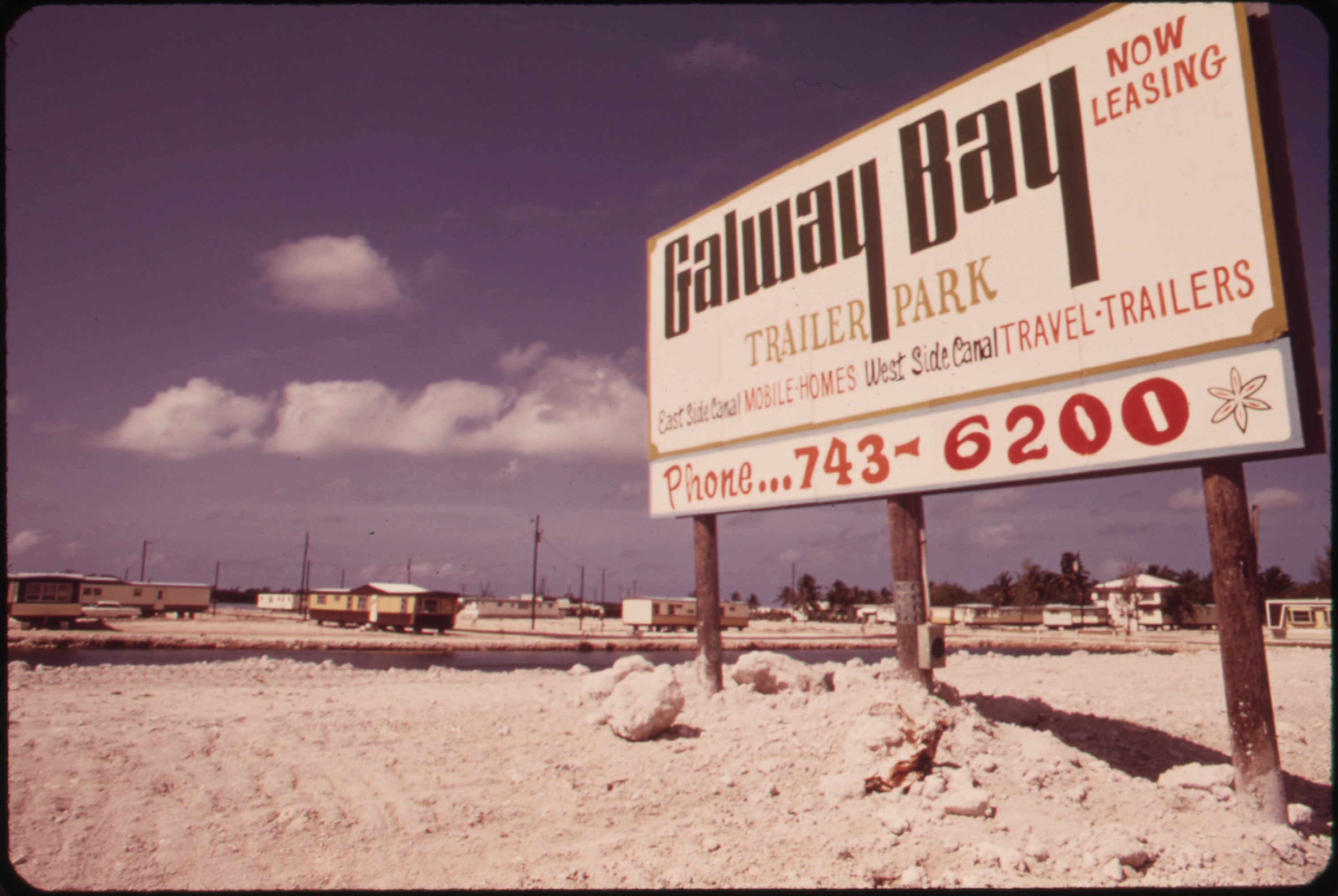
A trailer park under construction in Marathon, 1973

Though the area has been settled for some time, Marathon is a relatively new city, incorporated in 1999.

The name Marathon dates back to the origin of the Florida East Coast Railroad. The name came from the railroad workers who were working night and day to complete the railway; due to the unrelenting pace and struggle to complete the project, workers complained that "this is getting to be a real marathon", and the word was later used to name the local railroad station.

The Keys historian Dan Gallager in his book Florida's Great Ocean Railway credits New York playwright Witter Bynner for naming Marathon. According to Gallager, J.R. Parrott, then Florida East Coast Railway's president and General Manager, invited Brynner to the Keys to "plot stations for the railroad". When asked to generate a name for the station at Key Vaca, Brynner proposed "Marathon", inspired by the following passage from Byron: "The mountains look on Marathon—and Marathon looks on the sea."

=== Hurricane Irma ===
Marathon experienced significant damage from the September 10, 2017, U.S. landfall of Hurricane Irma. One of the earliest casualties of the storm was a man who died in a school shelter. Marathon was one of the earliest spots in the Keys to receive transport of needed supplies to deal with the aftermath of Irma. The Air National Guard landed two C-130 transport planes every two hours beginning on the morning of September 11.

== Geography ==
Marathon occupies a series of keys (islands) near the middle of the Florida Keys. Via U.S. Route 1, it is 50 miles (80 km) northeast of Key West and 54 miles (87 km) southwest of Key Largo. To the south or southeast lies Hawk Channel, a popular passage for vessels traveling along the Keys.

The city boundaries extend from the east end of the Seven Mile Bridge (Mile Marker 47) to the west end of Tom's Harbor Bridge (Mile Marker 61), excluding that portion of the area within the city limits of Key Colony Beach. Among the islands within the city limits are Boot Key, Knight's Key, Hog Key, Vaca Key, Stirrup Key, Crawl Key, Little Crawl Key, East and West Sister's Island, Deer Key, Fat Deer Key (excluding the portion in Key Colony Beach), Long Point Key, and Grassy Key. The Marathon Publix and the United States Post Office for Marathon (zipcode 33050) are near the stop light on the Overseas Highway (US 1) for Sombrero Beach Road at Mile Marker (MM) 50 which is the major business district for Marathon and is about halfway between Key Largo and Key West.

According to the United States Census Bureau, the city has a total area of 9.28 square miles (24.0 km^{2}), of which 8.45 square miles (21.9 km^{2}) are land and 0.83 square miles (2.15 km^{2}), or 8.97%, are water. Its city limits extend 1,200 feet (370 m) from land into the adjacent waters.

Boot Key Harbor is a natural body of water between Boot Key and Key Vaca, entirely within the Marathon city limits.

=== Climate ===
Marathon has a tropical savanna climate (Aw in the Köppen and Trewartha climate classifications). There is no record of snow/frost/freeze in Marathon. Like much of Florida and the Florida Keys, Marathon has two seasons; a hot and wet season from May through October, and a warm and dry season from November through April.

Climate data for Marathon, Florida (Florida Keys Marathon Airport), 1991–2020 normals, extremes 1950–present
Month	Jan	Feb	Mar	Apr	May	Jun	Jul	Aug	Sep	Oct	Nov	Dec	Year
Record high °F (°C)	88 (31)	89 (32)	90 (32)	94 (34)	96 (36)	99 (37)	99 (37)	98 (37)	97 (36)	96 (36)	91 (33)	88 (31)	99 (37)
Mean maximum °F (°C)	83.7 (28.7)	84.6 (29.2)	86.4 (30.2)	88.7 (31.5)	91.2 (32.9)	93.1 (33.9)	94.3 (34.6)	94.2 (34.6)	92.9 (33.8)	90.2 (32.3)	86.6 (30.3)	84.5 (29.2)	95.0 (35.0)
Mean daily maximum °F (°C)	75.8 (24.3)	78.1 (25.6)	80.7 (27.1)	84.1 (28.9)	87.5 (30.8)	90.3 (32.4)	90.9 (32.7)	91.6 (33.1)	89.9 (32.2)	86.2 (30.1)	81.2 (27.3)	77.9 (25.5)	84.5 (29.2)
Daily mean °F (°C)	70.0 (21.1)	72.3 (22.4)	74.6 (23.7)	78.3 (25.7)	81.7 (27.6)	84.4 (29.1)	85.2 (29.6)	85.6 (29.8)	84.2 (29.0)	81.0 (27.2)	76.0 (24.4)	72.7 (22.6)	78.8 (26.0)
Mean daily minimum °F (°C)	64.2 (17.9)	66.4 (19.1)	68.5 (20.3)	72.5 (22.5)	75.8 (24.3)	78.5 (25.8)	79.4 (26.3)	79.7 (26.5)	78.4 (25.8)	75.8 (24.3)	70.8 (21.6)	67.5 (19.7)	73.1 (22.8)
Mean minimum °F (°C)	50.4 (10.2)	53.3 (11.8)	57.1 (13.9)	63.8 (17.7)	69.8 (21.0)	72.6 (22.6)	73.8 (23.2)	73.2 (22.9)	73.1 (22.8)	68.8 (20.4)	60.6 (15.9)	55.1 (12.8)	47.7 (8.7)
Record low °F (°C)	39 (4)	40 (4)	48 (9)	52 (11)	61 (16)	65 (18)	65 (18)	67 (19)	66 (19)	56 (13)	44 (7)	37 (3)	37 (3)
Average precipitation inches (mm)	1.64 (42)	1.70 (43)	1.33 (34)	2.11 (54)	3.36 (85)	4.23 (107)	3.77 (96)	5.32 (135)	6.37 (162)	5.90 (150)	1.79 (45)	2.20 (56)	39.72 (1,009)
Average precipitation days (≥ 0.01 in)	7.9	6.0	5.8	5.0	7.9	10.4	12.5	14.3	15.1	11.7	7.1	8.3	112.0
Source: NOAA

== Demographics ==
Historical population
Census	Pop.	Note	%±
1970	4,397		—
1980	7,568		72.1%
1990	8,857		17.0%
2000	10,255		15.8%
2010	8,297		−19.1%
2020	9,689		16.8%
U.S. Decennial Census

=== Racial and ethnic composition ===
Marathon racial composition (Hispanics excluded from racial categories) (NH = Non-Hispanic)
Race	Pop 2010	Pop 2020	% 2010	% 2020
White (NH)	5,508	6,058	66.39%	62.52%
Black or African American (NH)	357	365	4.30%	3.77%
Native American or Alaska Native (NH)	25	16	0.30%	0.17%
Asian (NH)	90	84	1.08%	0.87%
Pacific Islander or Native Hawaiian (NH)	2	6	0.02%	0.06%
Some other race (NH)	2	26	0.02%	0.27%
Two or more races/Multiracial (NH)	89	230	1.07%	2.37%
Hispanic or Latino (any race)	2,224	2,904	26.80%	29.97%
Total	8,297	9,689		

=== 2020 census ===
As of the 2020 census, Marathon had a population of 9,689. The median age was 49.8 years. 15.3% of residents were under the age of 18 and 23.3% of residents were 65 years of age or older. For every 100 females, there were 105.1 males, and for every 100 females age 18 and over, there were 103.8 males age 18 and over.

91.8% of residents lived in urban areas, while 8.2% lived in rural areas.

There were 4,285 households in Marathon, of which 22.4% had children under the age of 18 living in them. Of all households, 44.3% were married-couple households, 22.8% were households with a male householder and no spouse or partner present, and 22.5% were households with a female householder and no spouse or partner present. About 28.6% of all households were made up of individuals and 12.0% had someone living alone who was 65 years of age or older. There were 6,427 housing units, of which 33.3% were vacant. The homeowner vacancy rate was 3.9% and the rental vacancy rate was 12.1%.

According to the 2020 ACS 5-year estimates, there were 2,151 families residing in the city.

=== 2010 census ===
As of the 2010 United States census, there were 8,297 people, 3,755 households, and 2,247 families residing in the city.

=== 2000 census ===
As of the census of 2000, there were 10,255 people, 4,597 households, and 2,735 families residing in the city. The population density was 1,186.1 inhabitants per square mile (458.0/km^{2}). There were 6,791 housing units at an average density of 785.4 per square mile (303.2/km^{2}). The racial makeup of the city was 91.09% White, 4.65% African American, 0.36% Native American, 0.48% Asian, 0.04% Pacific Islander, 2.00% from other races, and 1.38% from two or more races. Hispanic or Latino of any race were 20.43% of the population.

In 2000, there were 4,597 households, out of which 34.8% had children under the age of 18 living with them, 48.0% were married couples living together, 7.5% had a female householder with no husband present, and 20.5% were non-families. 29.2% of all households were made up of individuals, and 8.6% had someone living alone who was 65 years of age or older. The average household size was 2.19 and the average family size was 2.68.

In 2000, in the city, the population was spread out, with 17.3% under the age of 18, 6.1% from 18 to 24, 28.6% from 25 to 44, 32.0% from 45 to 64, and 16.0% who were 65 years of age or older. The median age was 44 years. For every 100 females, there were 110.6 males. For every 100 females age 18 and over, there were 111.7 males.

In 2000, the median income for a household in the city was $36,010, and the median income for a family was $46,361. Males had a median income of $27,057 versus $24,592 for females. The per capita income for the city was $22,894. About 9.4% of families and 14.2% of the population were below the poverty line, including 10.9% of those under age 18 and 13.5% of those age 65 or over.

As of 2000, English as a first language accounted for 78.10%, while Spanish as a mother tongue made up 20.95% of the population.

== Religion ==
=== Churches ===
- Calvary Baptist Church
- Church of Christ
- First Baptist Church
- Jehovah's Witnesses Kingdom Hall
- Kirk of the Keys (Covenant Order Evangelical Presbyterian-ECO)
- Marathon Baptist Church
- Marathon Church of God
- Marathon Community United Methodist Church
- Marathon Seventh Day Adventist
- Martin Luther Chapel
- New Life Assembly of God
- Saint Paul A.M.E Church
- San Pablo Catholic Church
- St Columba Episcopal Church
- The Church of Jesus Christ of Latter-day Saints

== Economy ==
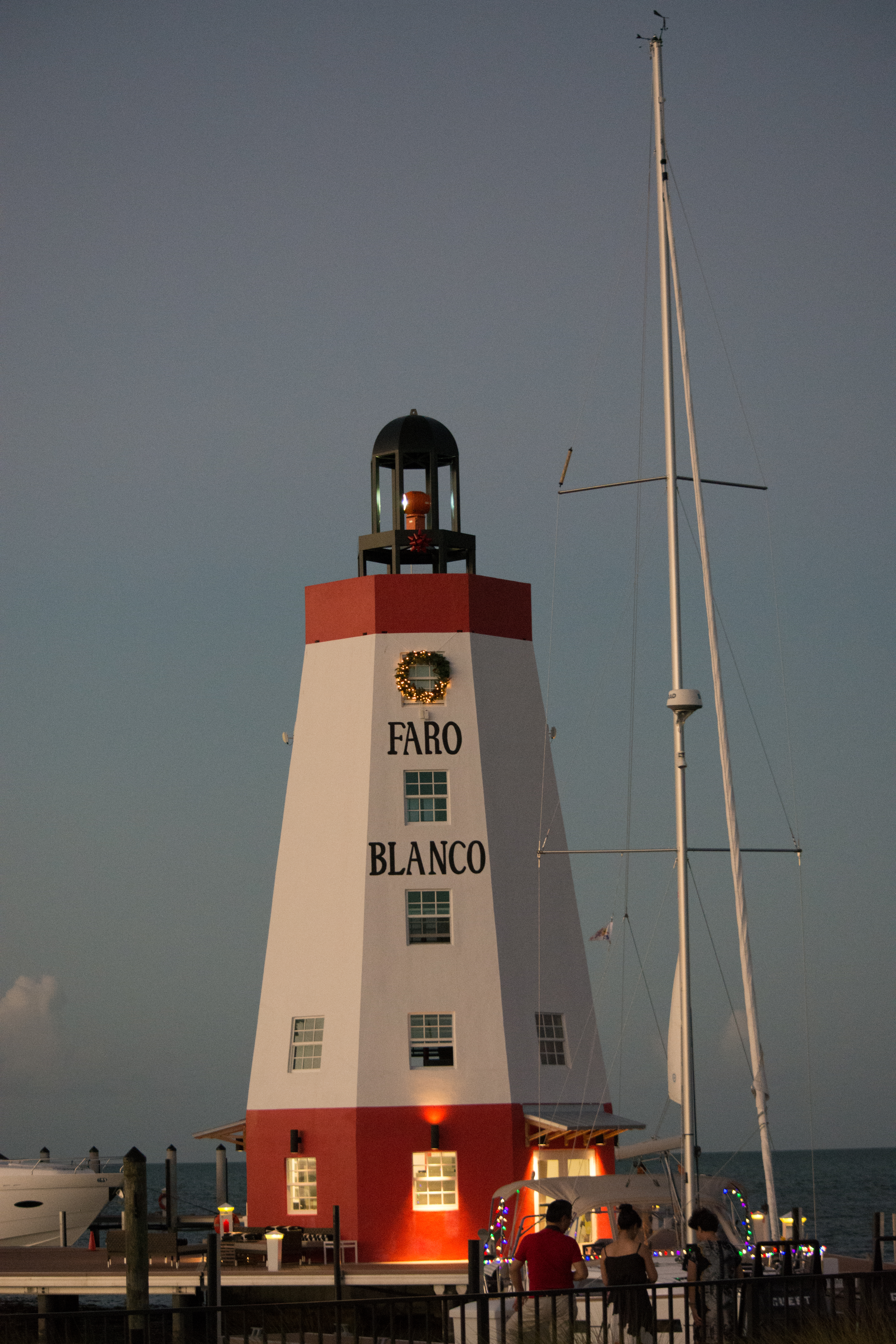
Faro Blanco Lighthouse

Marathon is a major sport fishing destination, with several charter fishing boats departing from local marinas every morning to both the Gulf of Mexico and the Atlantic Ocean. Bountiful reefs around Marathon make it a popular diving, snorkeling, spearfishing, and lobster tickling area. One of the last untouched tropical hardwood hammocks in the Keys is found at Crane Point Museum, just a few miles west of Florida Keys Marathon Airport. The vicinity of the airport is one of the most reliable sites in the United States to see the hard-to-find Antillean nighthawk. As in the rest of the Keys in summer, gray kingbirds are often seen on telephone wires along US 1 and black-whiskered vireos incessantly sing in the hammocks. Marathon also hosts burrowing owls.

The Fisherman's Hospital is in the west end of the city. It is one of just three hospitals in the Florida Keys. Marathon is home to another "hospital", The Turtle Hospital, one of a handful of facilities in the United States that rescue, rehabilitate, and release injured sea turtles.

Marathon derives much of its livelihood from the ocean and seafood is a staple at most restaurants.

Marathon has the tallest building in the Keys, Bonefish Tower at 143 feet (44 m) on Coco Plum, as well as Sombrero Country Club, the Keys' only country club. It was damaged by several recent hurricanes.

== Arts and culture ==
=== Library ===
A branch of the Monroe County Public Library System is located in Marathon. The current library was completed in 2021 and has several state of the art features relative to the previous library on the island.

== Education ==
Residents are zoned to schools in the Monroe County School District.

=== Schools ===
- Stanley Switlik Elementary (K–5 center)
- Marathon Middle/High School
- Martin Luther Children's Day School
- Kreative Kids Christian Academy

== Transportation ==
=== Highways ===
Marathon is served by U.S. Highway 1, known locally as the Overseas Highway. The Overseas Highway extends westward, connecting Marathon with Key West. To the northeast, the Overseas Highway connects Marathon to Homestead and Miami.

=== Airport ===
Marathon is served by the Florida Keys Marathon Airport (IATA: MTH, ICAO: KMTH).

=== Mass transit ===
Metrobus Route 301 (Dade-Monroe Express) carries riders back-and-forth from Marathon with a stop near MM 50 and the Publix store to a stop near Walmart in Florida City, with additional stops at Islamorada, Tavernier, and Key Largo.

Key West Transit connects Marathon with Key West.

Greyhound Lines buses run east and west from Marathon twice a day, stopping at the Marathon Airport.

== Notable people ==
- Tony Bryant, former NFL player
- Gary Burghoff, Radar from the TV series M*A*S*H
- Nick Carter, Backstreet Boys member
- Clarence Clemons, E Street Band saxophonist
- Stanley Switlik, parachuting pioneer
- Max Yasgur, Woodstock's farmer legend

== See also ==
- Florida Keys Keynoter
- George Adderley House
- Pigeon Key
- Hurricane Donna
- Marathon Shores
