= Pigeon Key Historic District =

Historic district in Florida, United States

- U.S. National Register of Historic Places
- U.S. Historic district
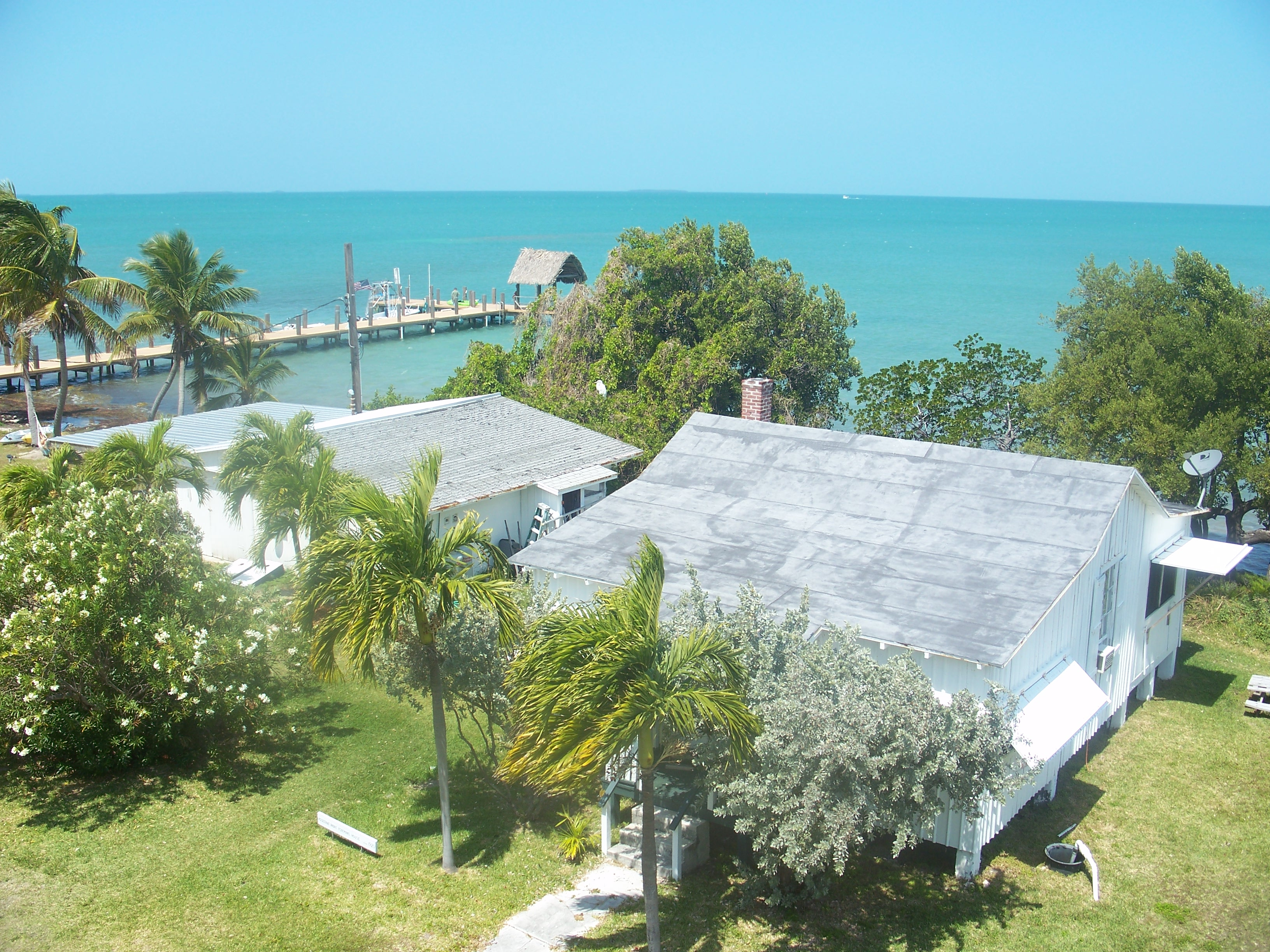
- Southern part of Pigeon Key, viewed from the old Seven Mile Bridge

- Location within Florida Location within the United States
- Location: Monroe County, Florida
- Nearest city: Islamorada
- Coordinates: 24°42′14″N 81°9′19″W
- Area: 50 acres (20 ha)
- NRHP reference No.: 90000443
- Added to NRHP: March 16, 1990

The Pigeon Key Historic District is a U.S. historic district (designated as such on March 16, 1990) located on Pigeon Key in Florida. The district is off U.S. 1 at mile marker 45. It contains 11 historic buildings and 3 structures. Although the old Seven Mile Bridge crosses over the island, at approximately mile marker 45, west of Knight's Key, (city of Marathon in the middle Florida Keys) and just east of Moser Channel, which is the deepest section of the seven-mile span, it and its exit ramp to the island were closed in 2008 and not reopened until 2022. While the bridge was closed, access was by ferry or private watercraft only, but in 2014 FDOT approved a $77 million plan to restore it. The old bridge was restored and reopened in 2022.

The island is named "Cayo Paloma" on many old Spanish charts.

The island is said to be named for large flocks of white-crowned pigeons (Columba leucocephala Linnaeus) which once roosted there. During the building of Henry Flagler's Overseas Railroad Key West Extension, a major construction depot was located there, the jumping off point for construction of the Seven Mile Bridge. A number of buildings from the Flagler era remain on the island. They are now part of the Pigeon Key Historic District.

A rare three-way bridge, now partially abandoned, is located there.

== Popular culture ==
This place was featured during the 18th-season finale as the Finish Line of the hit reality series, The Amazing Race: Unfinished Business.

== Gallery ==
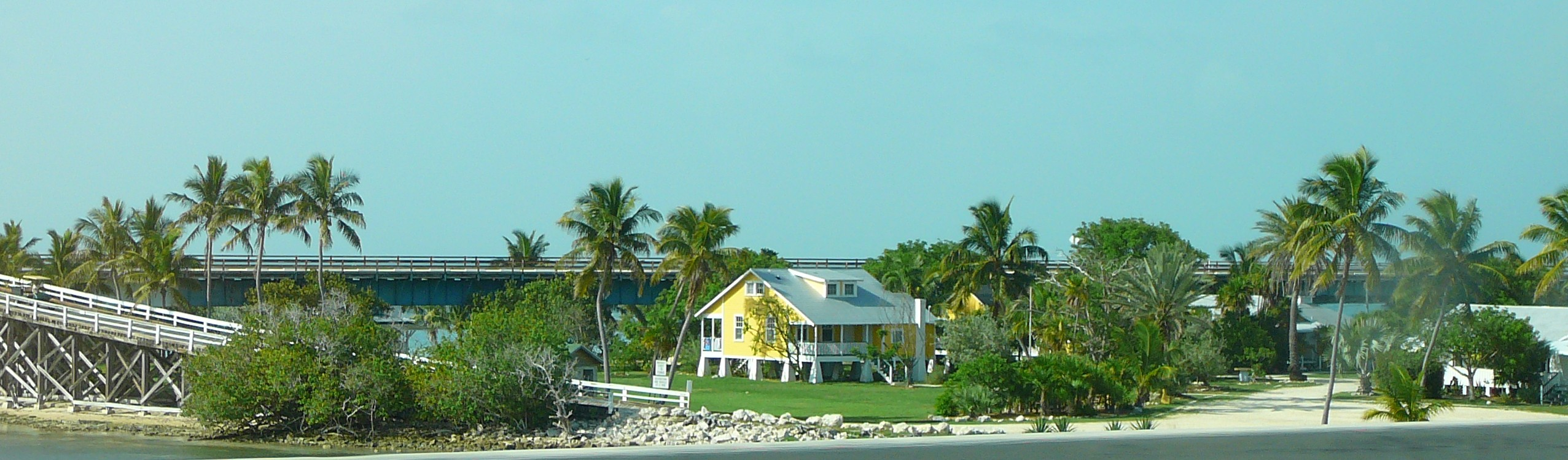
Partial view of Pigeon Key. The old Seven Mile Bridge is shown crossing the island in the background. The exit ramp is shown to the left.

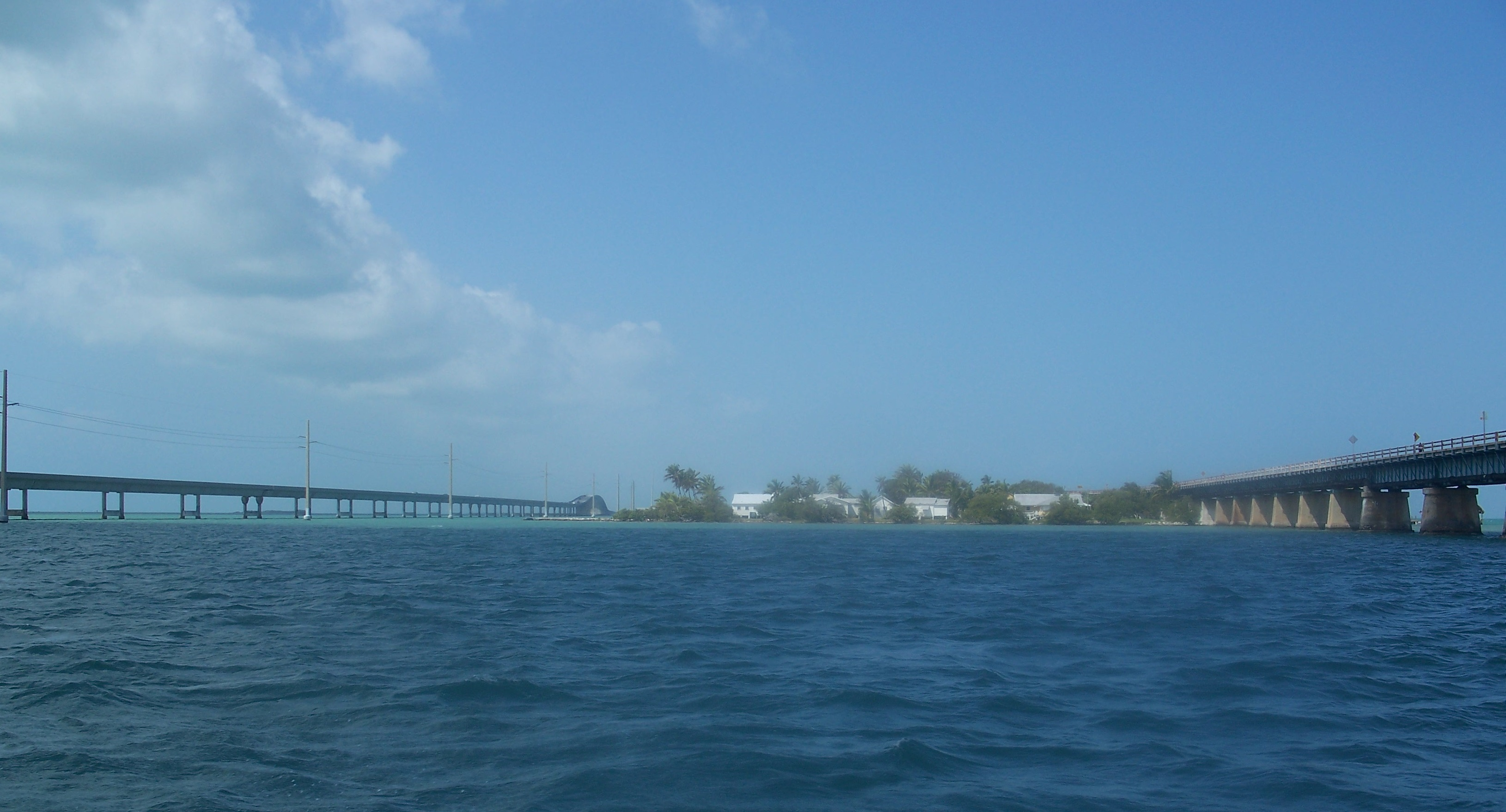
Pigeon Key, from the east. Old Seven Mile Bridge on right, new one on left

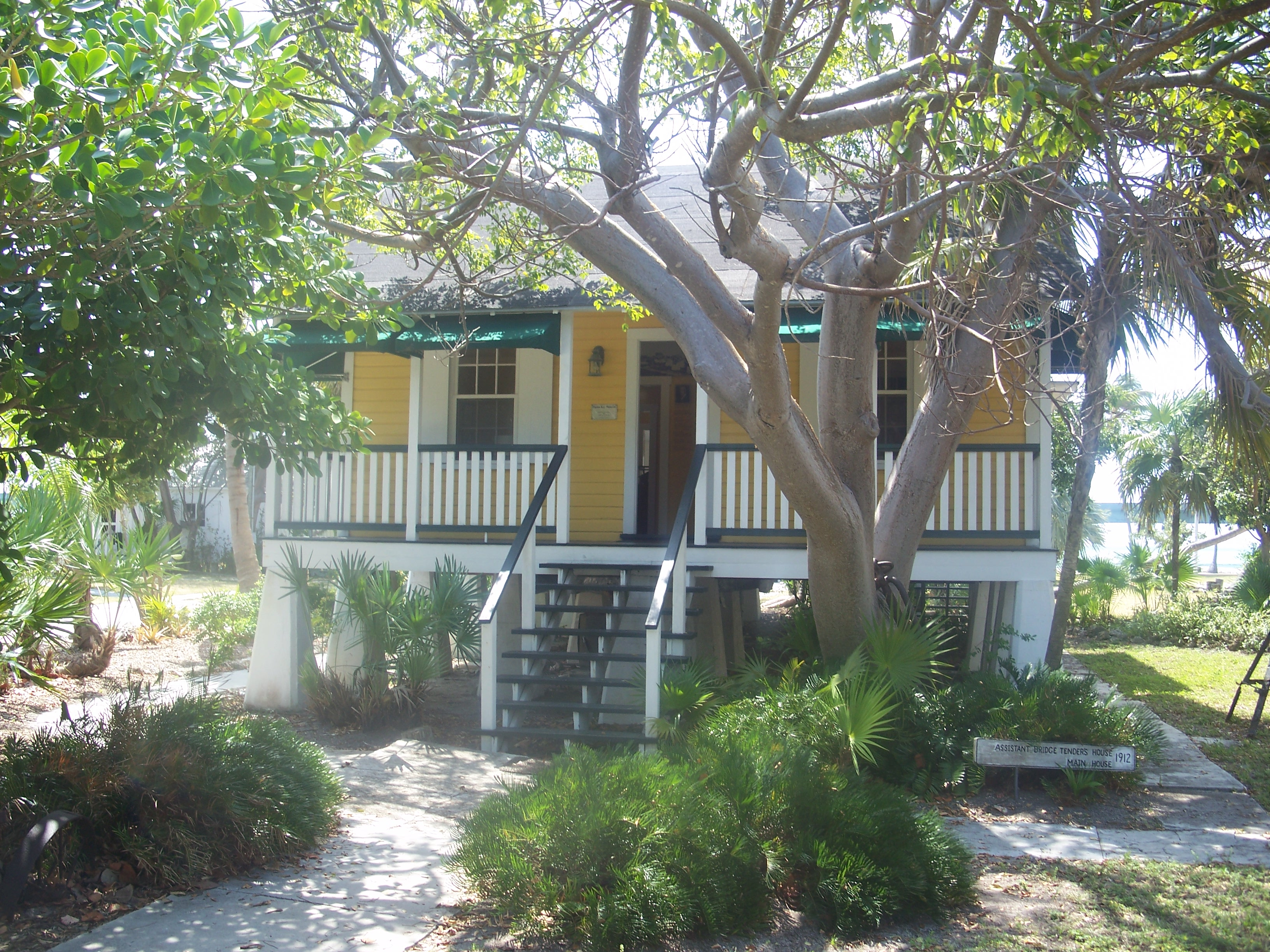
Assistant bridge tender's house

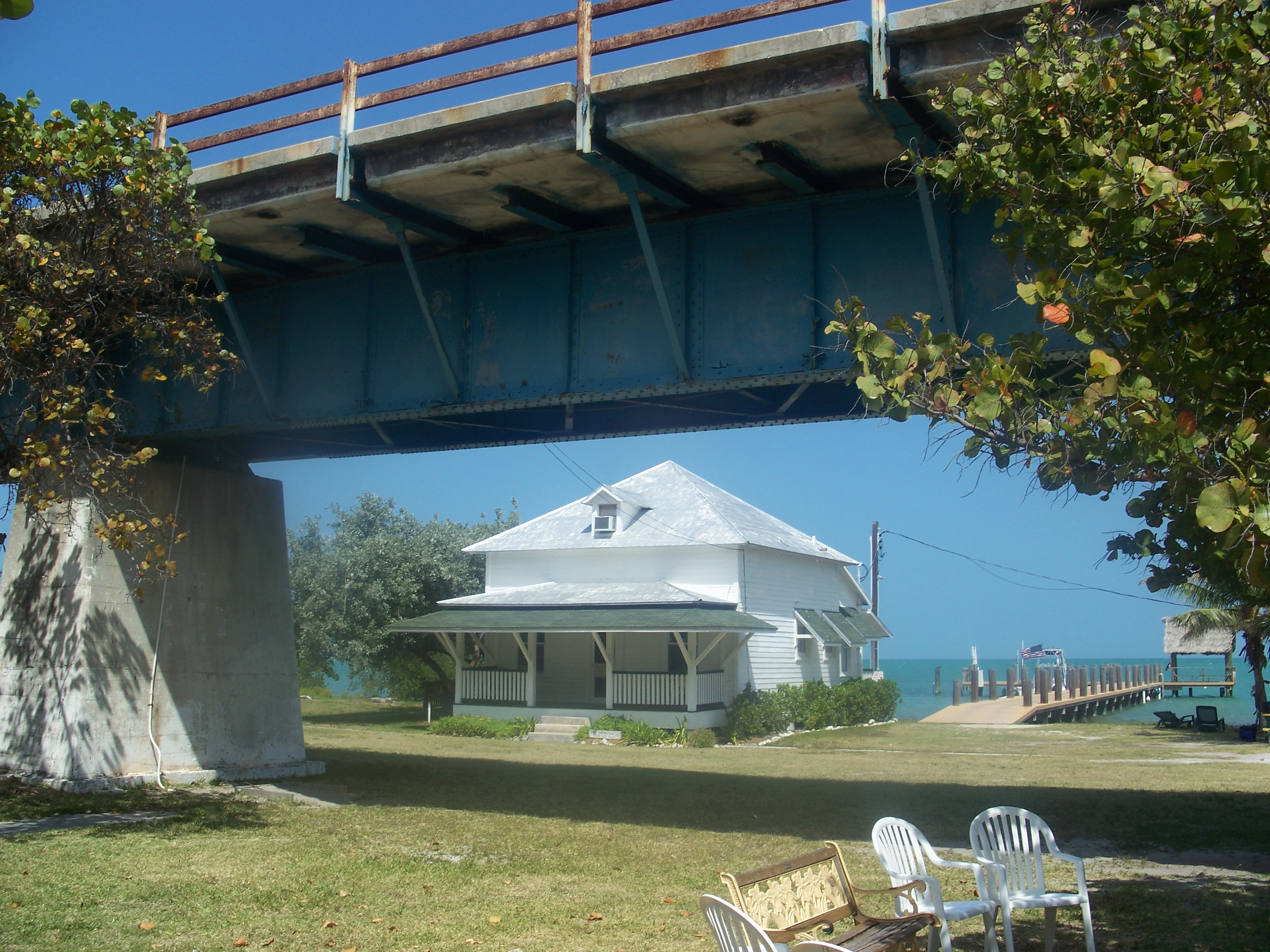
Old bridge and foreman's house

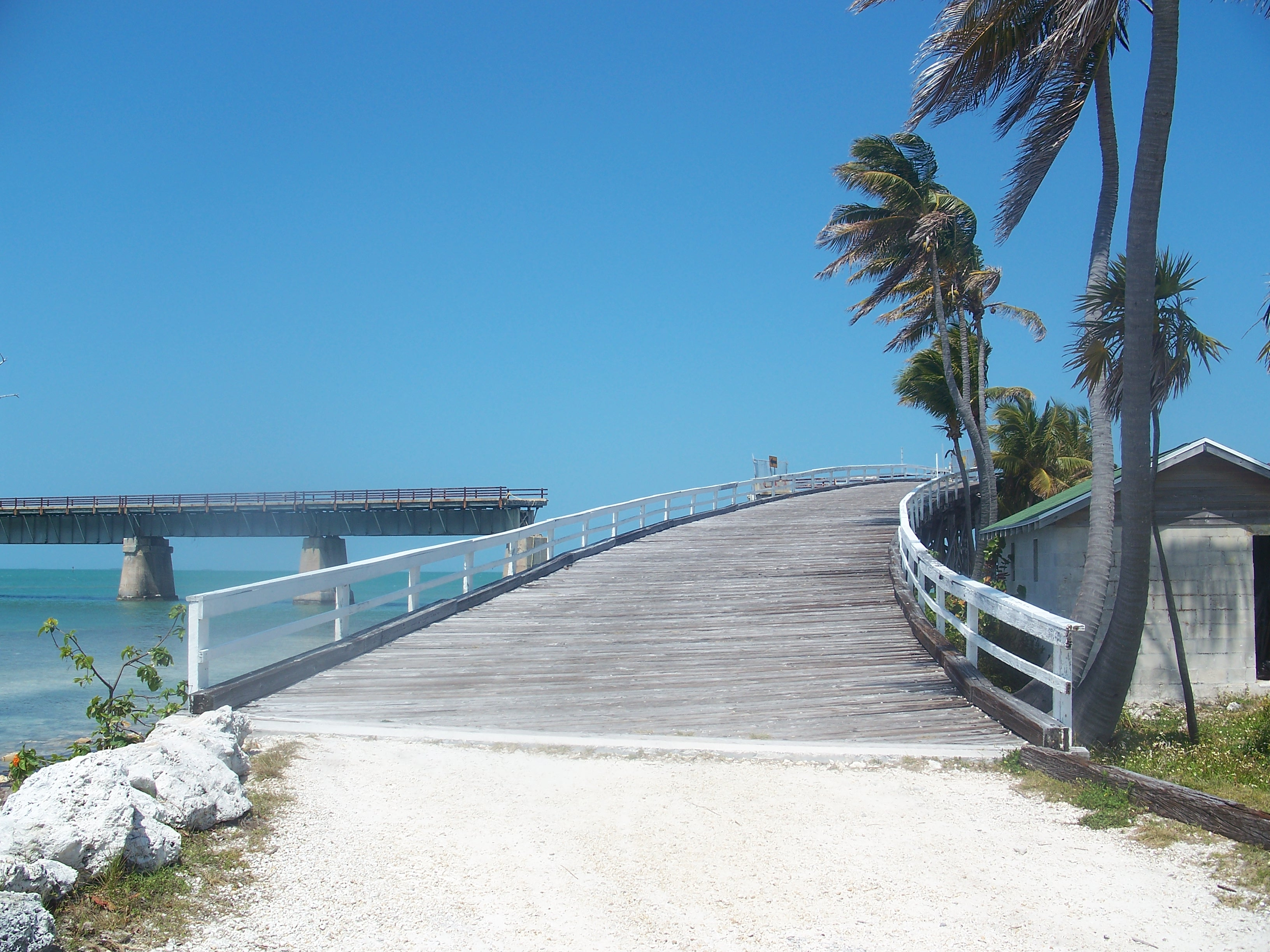
Ramp that comes off old bridge

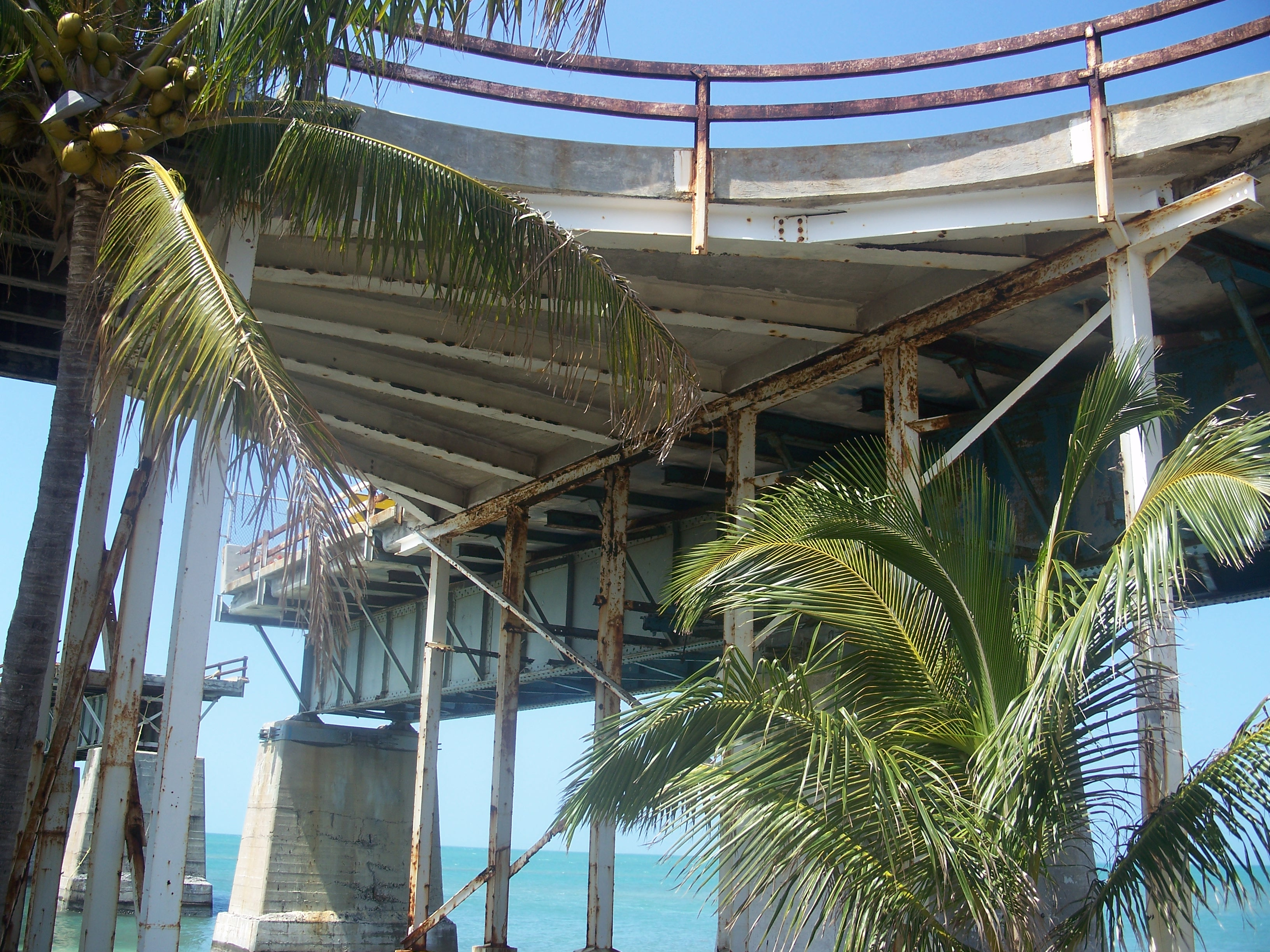
Under ramp that comes off old bridge

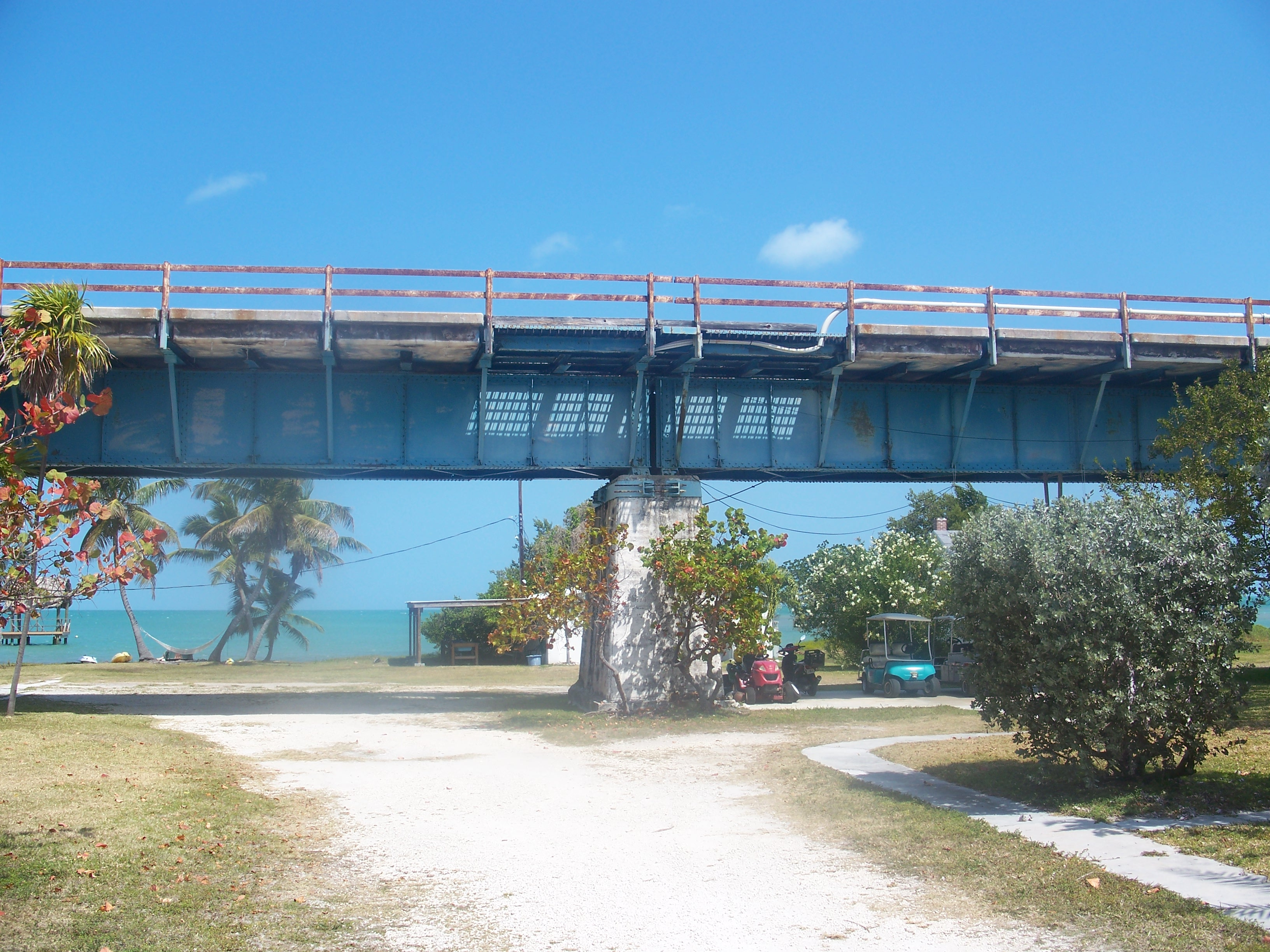
Old bridge

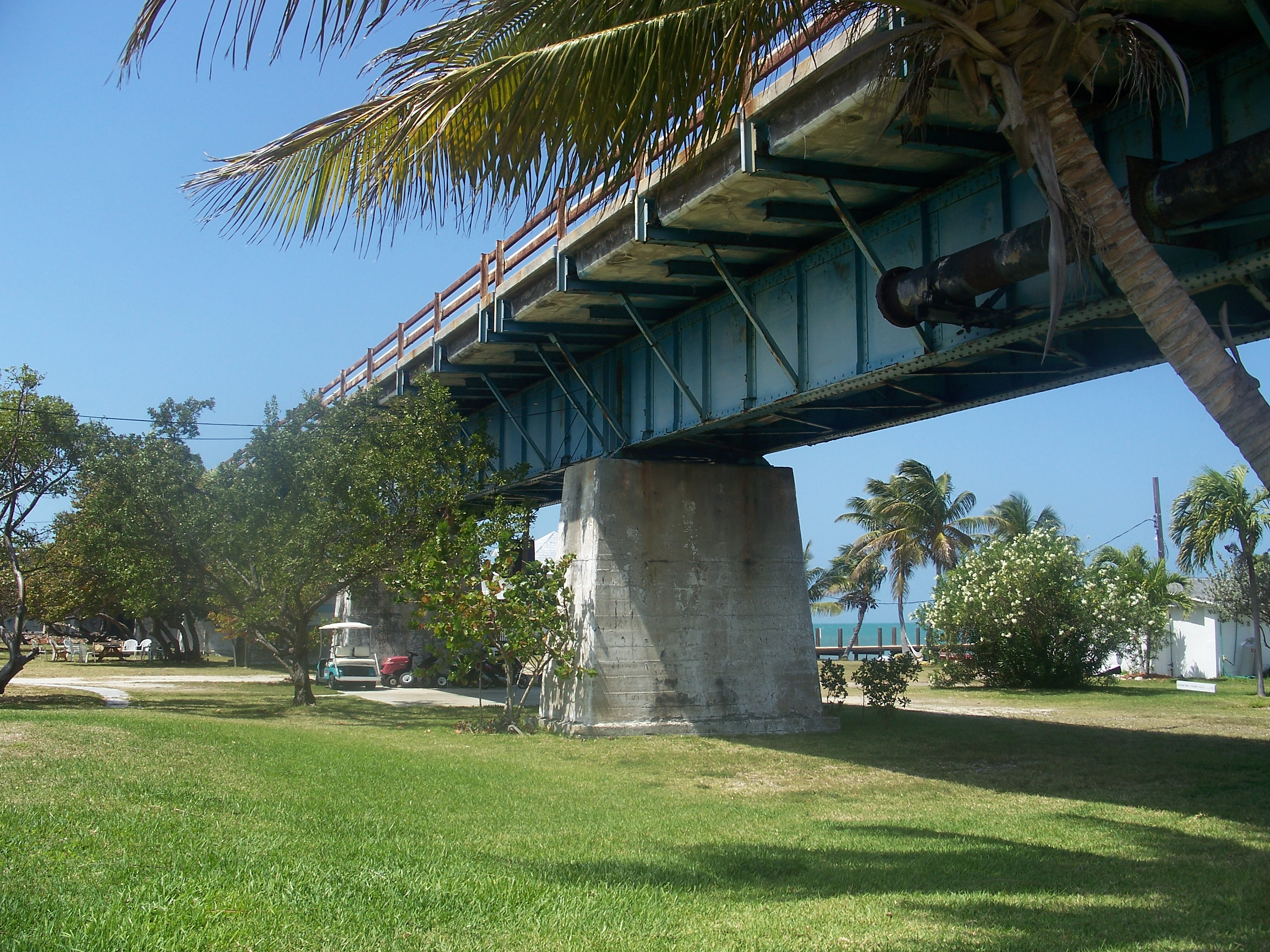
Old bridge
