= Seven Mile Bridge Run =

The Seven Mile Bridge run is an annual race held in the Florida Keys by the Marathon Runners Club. The race is run as a benefit for youth activities in Marathon, Florida. The event was first held in 1982 to commemorate the completion of the Florida Keys bridge rebuilding program. The bridge, one of the longest segmental bridges in the world, spans the channel between Knight's Key and Little Duck Key.

It is one of the few races that takes place entirely over water, and actually covers a distance of 6.8 miles (10.9 km) - a little shorter than the name suggests. The local Sheriff's Department close the bridge between 6:45am and 9am, with the race kicking off at 7:30am. Runners therefore have up to 1 hour 30 minutes to traverse the bridge, and 'beat the bus' - if they can't keep up with the pace they are picked up by one of a small fleet of yellow school buses. A post-race party follows after the finishing runners are returned to the starting area by bus.

Until 2012, entry to the race was via a postal lottery, with demand for places far outstripping the 1,500 spots available, restricted due to safety reasons. Applicants sent a self-addressed stamped envelope to the Marathon Runners Club before a specified deadline, at which date the Club sends all the applications to the prospective participants in the same delivery. The first 1,500 applications they then receive back are the 1,500 runners who gain entry. As a result, most participants were from the South of Florida and the Keys. Since 2012, registration has taken place online, typically with places filling up within an hour of opening.

April 21, 2012 was the first that the race was not run as planned. There were severe thunderstorms over Knight's Key during the early hours of the morning and just before the starting pistol was due to fire, the decision was taken to abandon the race rather than allow the runners on the bridge to be at risk of lightning strike. The 39th annual race, scheduled for March 28, 2020, was canceled due to the COVID-19 coronavirus pandemic.
