= Beach Town Posters =

- Artist: Aurelio Grisanty
- Year: 2005-
- Medium: Poster
- Movement: Art Deco
- Subject: A resort town or city in the United States
- Dimensions: (18" in × 24" in)

Beach Town Posters is an ongoing series of original Art Deco-style fine art posters designed and rendered by painter, muralist and graphic designer Aurelio Grisanty. The posters are created in the style of vintage travel posters, travel ads or postcards from the 1920s and 1930s. Each poster is dedicated to a resort town or city in the United States.

The Beach Town Posters series currently includes 84 art posters from 64 cities or towns, with the artist adding between 5-10 new posters per year. Grisanty began designing Beach Town Posters in 2005 after being inspired by the vintage French beach posters that decorated his childhood vacation home in Santo Domingo, Dominican Republic.

== History ==
Grisanty began the line in 2005 with designs depicting his home town of Rehoboth Beach, Delaware and other nearby Mid-Atlantic beach towns. He later expanded the series to include beaches in northern and southern states on the East Coast. His first West Coast beach designs were released in 2009 for three cities in California.

The inaugural poster in the series is titled "Rehoboth - Silver Lake Original." All Beach Town Posters depict seaside towns or cities with the exception of four posters portraying Washington, D.C. landmarks.

In January 2013, Beach Town Posters partnered with Friends of The Old Seven, a not-for-profit organization dedicated to the salvation of the Old Seven Mile Bridge at Pigeon Key, Florida, to create a commemorative poster. Proceeds from the group's sales of the Pigeon Key poster went to restoration efforts.

Grisanty and his business partner, Clare Conley, continue expanding the series to include more beaches in the United States. Poster designs are chosen based on fan feedback and requests.

== Poster designs ==
Other Beach Town Poster designs include:

California: Laguna Beach; Point Reyes; San Diego; Santa Barbara, CA; Hermosa Beach, CA
Delaware: Bethany Beach (3 poster designs) Dewey Beach (2 poster designs); Fenwick Island (2 poster designs); Rehoboth Beach (7 poster designs); Lewes (2 poster designs); Milton, Delaware;Georgetown, Delaware
Florida: Captiva Island; Clearwater, FL; Daytona Beach; Key West (2 poster designs); Cocoa Beach; Ormond Beach; Pigeon Key; Sanibel Island; St. Augustine, FL; Venice, FL; Bahia Honda Key
Georgia: Savannah; Tybee Island
Maryland: Annapolis; Assateague Island; Ocean City, MD (3 poster designs)
Massachusetts: Cape Cod
New Jersey: Cape May (2 poster designs); Ocean City, New Jersey; Wildwood, New Jersey; Long Beach Island; Avalon, New Jersey; Stone Harbor, New Jersey; Atlantic City; Asbury Park
New York: Fishers Island; Fire Island (2 poster designs)
North Carolina: Cape Hatteras; Cape Lookout; Corolla, North Carolina; Duck, North Carolina; Holden Beach; Kitty Hawk; Nags Head; Ocracoke Island; Outer Banks; Wrightsville Beach; Bald Head Island; Emerald Isle; Ocean Isle; Oak Island Lighthouse; Topsail Island; Sunset Beach, North Carolina
South Carolina: Charleston;Folly Beach, South Carolina; Hilton Head; Myrtle Beach; Pawleys Island
Virginia: Chincoteague Island; Virginia Beach (2 poster designs)
Washington, D.C.: Washington Monument; Jefferson Memorial; Lincoln Memorial; The White House

== Poster specifics ==
All of the images in the Beach Town Posters series are original, conceived of and rendered by Grisanty and signed by the artist. The posters are printed on heavy gloss paper measuring 18 x 24" using CMYK four-color offset printing technology.

== Media ==
- Beach Town Posters featured in Wilmington University art show, April 2011
- Beach Town Posters featured in Yachting Magazine, May 2011
- Beach Town Posters featured in Delmarva Almanac, May 2015
