= Missouri Key =

Island in the lower Florida Keys, United States

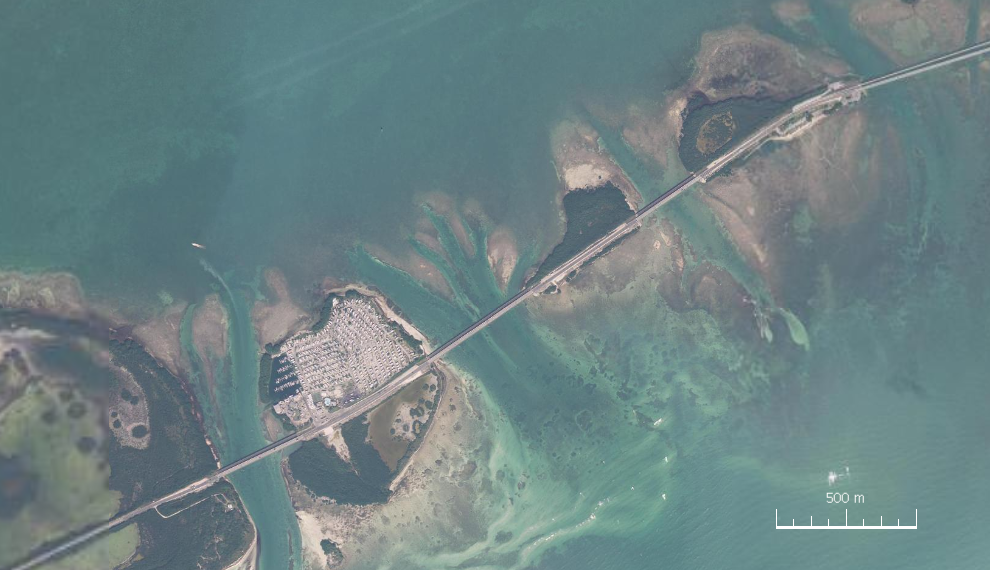
- Satellite image of Ohio Key, Missouri Key, Little Duck Key of Lower Florida Keys

- Missouri Key Missouri Key (the Caribbean)

Geography
- Location: Gulf of Mexico
- Coordinates: 24.678°N 81.238°W
- Archipelago: Florida Keys
- Adjacent to: Florida Straits

Administration
- United States
- State: Florida
- County: Monroe

Missouri Key is a small island in the lower Florida Keys.

U.S. 1 (or the Overseas Highway) crosses the key at approximately mile marker 39.5, between Ohio Key and Little Duck Key.

The island was named during Henry Flagler's Overseas Railroad construction years by workers from that state.

It is sometimes known locally as Little Grassy Key or Grassy Island.
