= Fred the Tree =

Celebrity Australian pine tree

Coordinates: 24.6896°N 81.2048°W

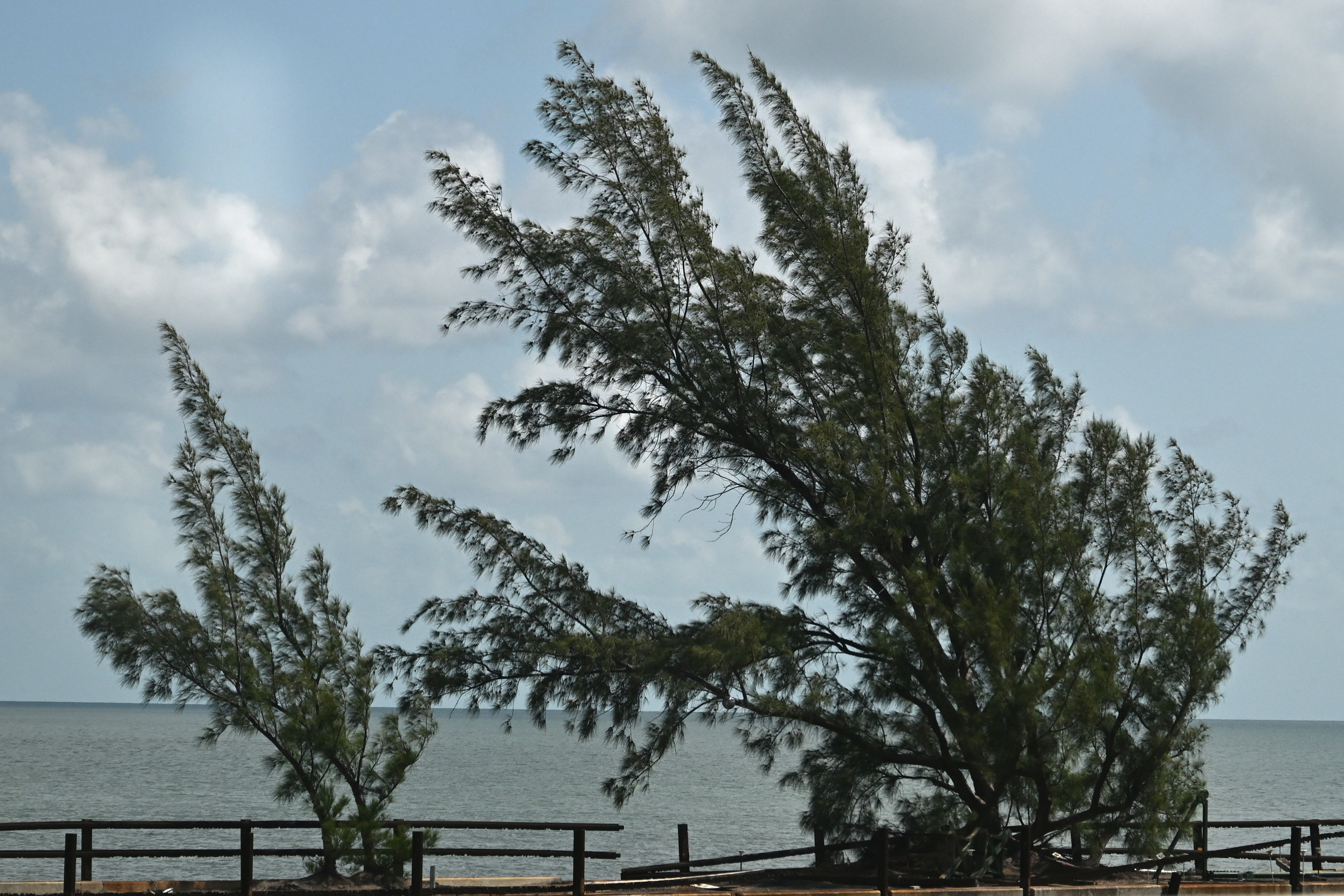
Fred the Tree and the younger tree on Seven Mile Bridge in Florida.

Fred the Tree is a wild-growing celebrity Casuarina tree (also known as an Australian pine, though it is not a true pine). It is located on the defunct Seven Mile Bridge, the part of Overseas Highway that connects the Florida Keys with mainland Florida. The tree is located on the old part of the highway, originally constructed as a railroad line, which can be seen from the new Overseas Highway.

The portion of the Old Seven Mile Bridge where Fred the Tree is located is not accessible through any means except boat or helicopter. It can be viewed from the Overseas Highway between Mile Marker 41 and 42. The trusses of the bridges were originally built with sand, so the Australian pine tree, which is capable of surviving in salty conditions with extreme heat, likely sprouted out of bird droppings, with its roots growing deep into the sand inside the concrete structure.

Fred the Tree is often referred to as a sign of hope and the resilience of the people in the Florida Keys due to its ability to thrive in such harsh conditions on a concrete bridge, while surviving a number of hurricanes and extreme weather events.

Fred the Tree has made appearances in books and media, it was featured most recently in the 2024 remake Road House. Fred the Tree has also been memorialized as a children's book by author Leigh Guest.

For over a decade a group of volunteers named Fred's Elves decorates the tree each year with lights and holiday decorations including a solar powered menorah. Even the smaller tree that has sprouted next to Fred is decorated.

Fred the Tree was heavily featured in the 2024 film Road House starring Jake Gyllenhaal.

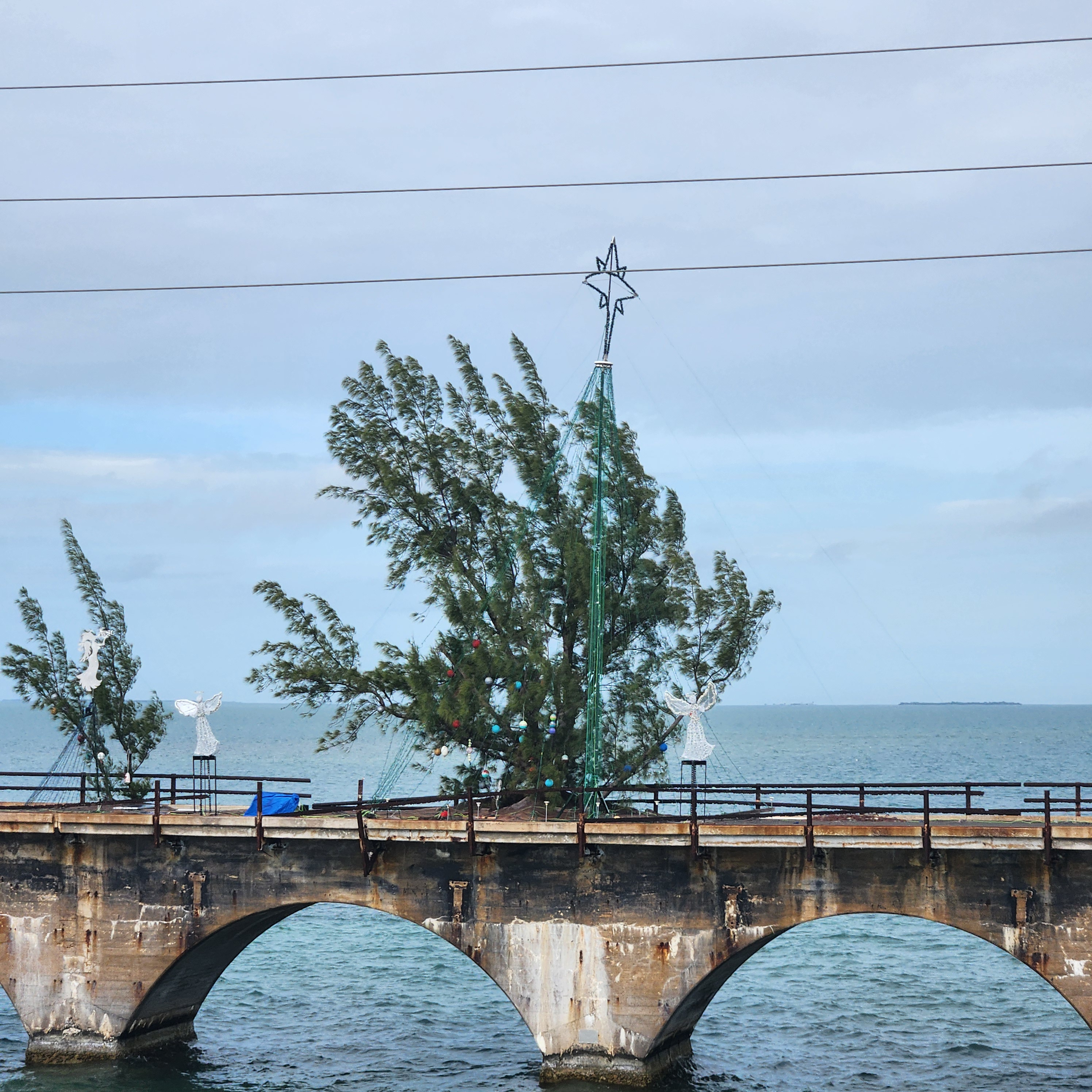
Fred the Tree (and his younger "sister" on the left), decorated for Christmas.

== See also ==
- Florida Keys
- Seven Mile Bridge
- Overseas Highway
