= Ohio Key =

Island in the lower Florida Keys, United States

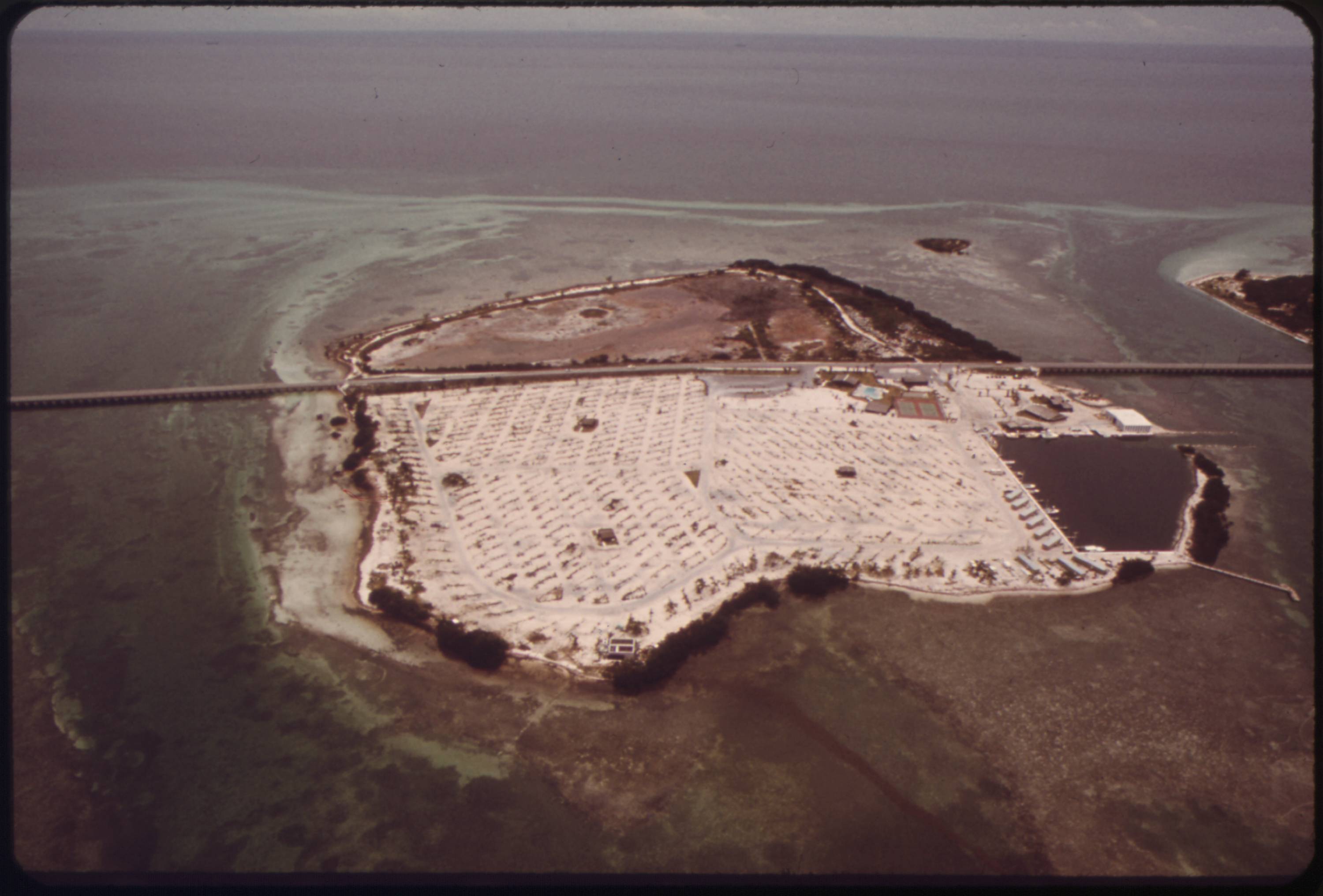
- Ohio Key with campsite under development.

- Ohio Key Ohio Key (the Caribbean)

Geography
- Location: Gulf of Mexico
- Coordinates: 24.672°N 81.247°W
- Archipelago: Florida Keys
- Adjacent to: Florida Straits

Administration
- United States
- State: Florida
- County: Monroe

US 1 (or the Overseas Highway) crosses the Ohio Key at approximately mile marker 39, between Missouri Key and Bahia Honda Key. Today it is also known as Sunshine Key, after a camping resort located there. The portion of the island south of U.S. Route 1 is protected as the Ohio Key National Wildlife Refuge.

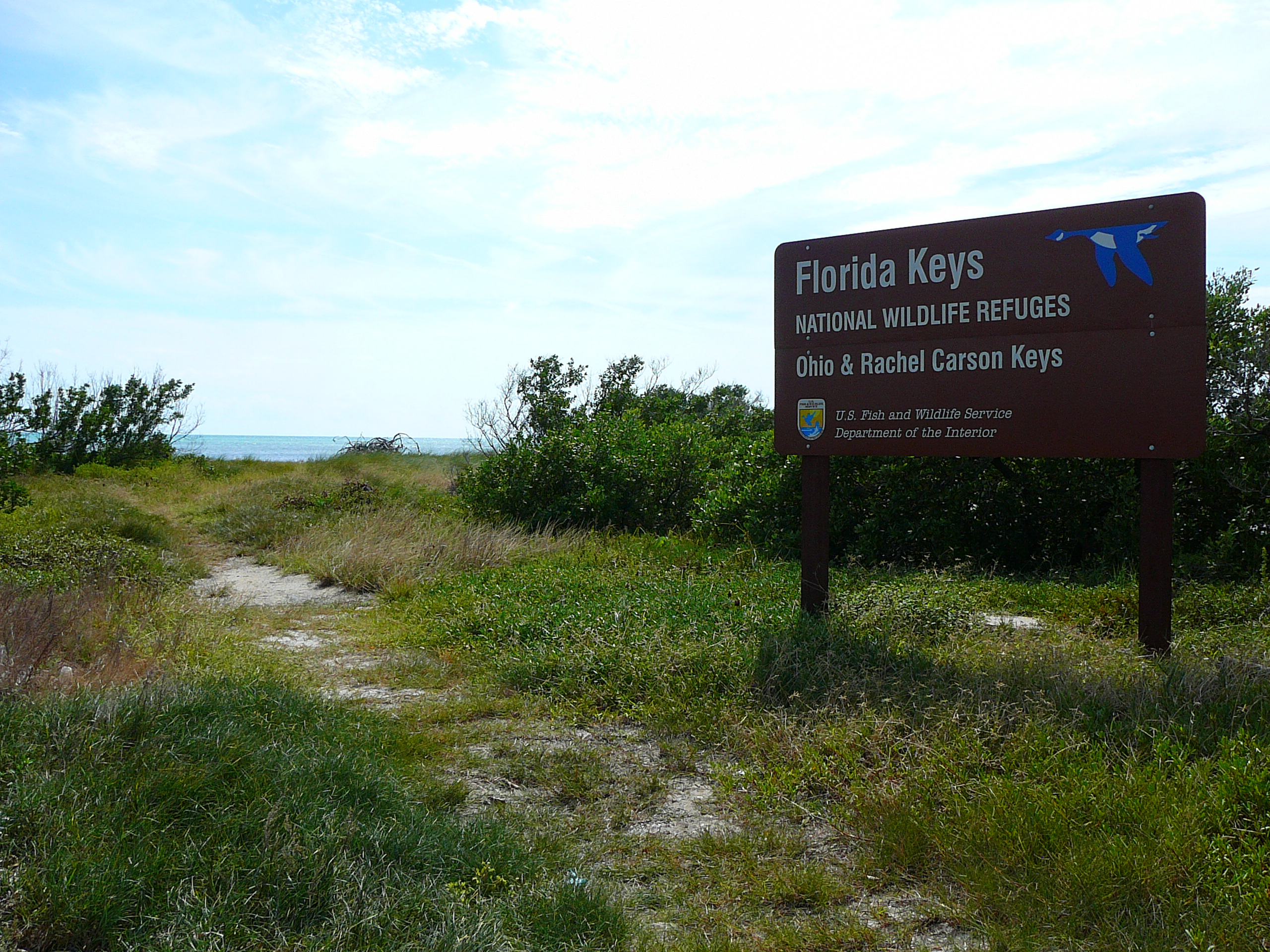
Ohio Keys signage.

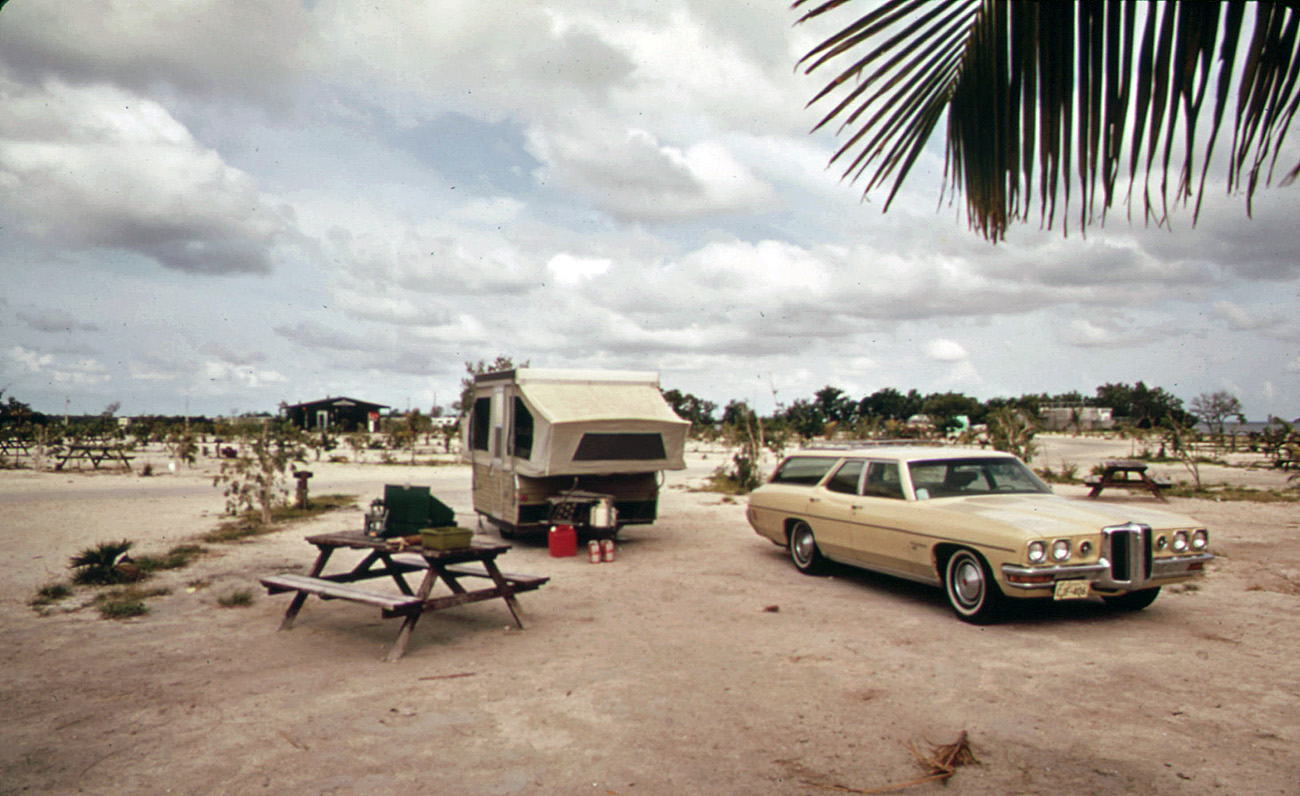
Nearly half of Ohio Key is a campground for trailers

== Former name ==
It was once known as Little Duck Key, however the name Little Duck Key is currently used for a very small island about a mile (1.6 km) to the east that is the western terminus of the Seven Mile Bridge.

== Flora and fauna ==
The oceanside area of Ohio Key has palm trees, buttonwood trees and mangrove trees, and bird watching occurs there.
