= Clarence Coe =

Clarence Coe may refer to:

- Clarence S. Coe (1865–1939), American master bridge builder and railroad civil engineer
- Clarence Clinton Coe (1864–1936), member of the Wisconsin State Assembly
- Clarence E. Coe (1873–1943), early settler in Palms, California and a member of the Los Angeles City Council
