= Clarence S. Coe =

American master bridge builder and railroad civil engineer

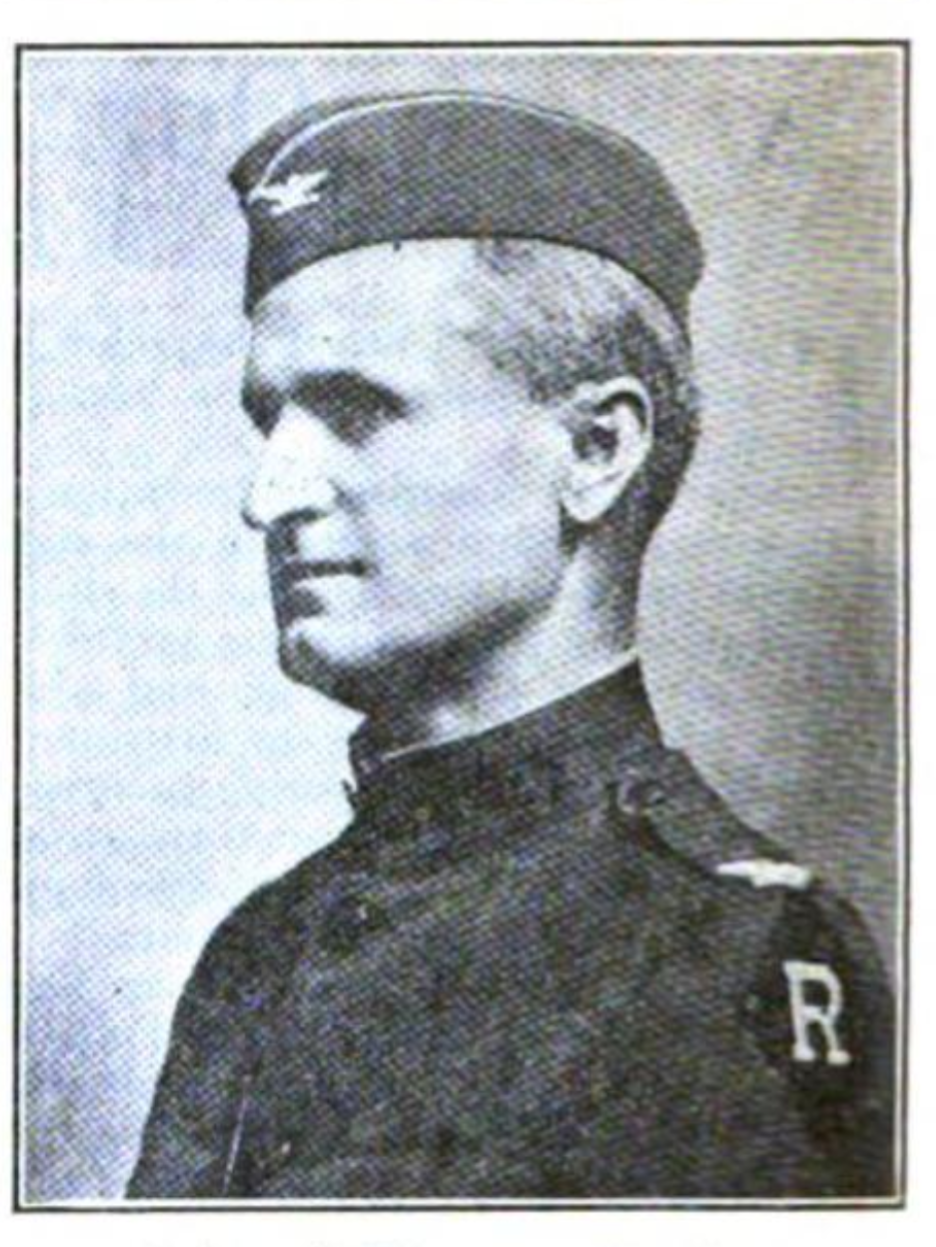
- Portrait of Coe
- Born: January 4, 1864; Riverside, Iowa
- Died: March 5, 1939 (aged 73); St. Augustine, Florida
- Spouse: Luela Joy (m. 1891)
- Children: 5
- Relatives: Descendants of Robert Coe

Clarence Stanley Coe (December 24, 1865 – March 5, 1939) was an American master bridge builder and railroad civil engineer, who supervised the planning and building of the Florida East Coast Railway's Seven Mile Bridge, linking the Florida Keys to Marathon, Monroe County, which, when completed in January 1912, was acclaimed as the longest bridge in the world and an engineering marvel. Later, Coe was appointed the first city manager of Miami, Florida, and after that was appointed chief engineer of Duval County, Florida.

== Early life and career ==
Coe was born as one of the nine children of Sylvester Coe and his wife, Ann (née Rowlands), a native of Llangollen, Wales.

He was educated at the University of Minnesota, earning a degree in engineering in 1889. After graduation, Coe held various engineering positions in the rapidly expanding railroad industry.

In 1905, he joined the Florida East Coast Railway, first as resident managing engineer of the Key West Extension, having charge of viaduct construction. As resident manager, he constructed viaducts totaling nearly 12 miles over open water. Coe had charge of the entire engineering and inspection departments, the labor force, and all floating equipment.

In 1910, Coe was promoted to division engineer with responsibility for overseeing construction of the Seven Mile Bridge over open ocean, a feat never before attempted.

=== Involvement with Florida East Coast Railway ===
The railroad line south of West Palm Beach was constructed in phases by the Florida East Coast Railway and its predecessor systems. Founder and owner Henry Flagler began his railroad building in 1892. Under Florida's generous land-grant laws passed in 1893, 8,000 acres (3,200 ha) could be claimed from the state for every mile (1.6 km) built. Flagler eventually claimed a total in excess of two million acres (8,000 km^{2}) for building the FEC, and land development and trading along the line became one of his most profitable endeavors.

Before it became the FEC, the Jacksonville, St. Augustine and Indian River Railway was constructing a line southwards from Daytona Beach in 1894. Fort Pierce was reached on January 29, and West Palm Beach on March 22. Further extension southwards did not begin until June 1895, when a favorable deal was signed with Miami-area business interests. Fort Lauderdale was reached on March 3 of the following year. By April, the construction reached Biscayne Bay, the largest and most accessible harbor on Florida's east coast.

=== Key West Extension ===
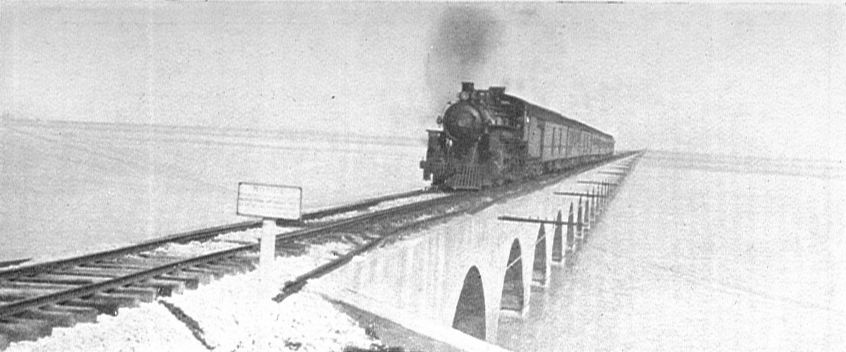
en route to Key West

Flagler next sought perhaps his greatest challenge: the extension of the Florida East Coast Railway to Key West, a city of almost 20,000 inhabitants located 128 miles (206 km) beyond the tip of the Florida peninsula.

One of the reasons Flagler wanted to build the Key West Extension was at the time Key West was a major coaling station for ship traffic between South America and New York. Flagler thought it would be profitable for coal to be brought by railroad to Key West for coaling those ships. But by the time the railroad was finished in 1912, range had been extended on the ships to such a degree that Key West was no longer a desirable stopover for coal.

Flagler also believed that linking Key West to the mainland after the United States announced in 1905 the construction of the Panama Canal, since the city was the United States' closest deep-water port to the canal, would be of advantage to Cuban and Latin America trade, as the opening of the canal would allow significant trade opportunities with the west.

The construction of the Overseas Railroad required many engineering innovations as well as vast amounts of labor and monetary resources. At one time during construction, 4,000 men were employed. During the seven-year construction, three hurricanes threatened to halt the project.

Despite the hardships, the final link of the Florida East Coast Railway was completed in 1912. On January 22 of that year, a proud Flagler rode the first passenger train into Key West, marking the completion of the railroad's overseas connection to Key West and the linkage by railway of the entire east coast of Florida.

=== Coe’s involvement in building the Seven Mile Bridge ===
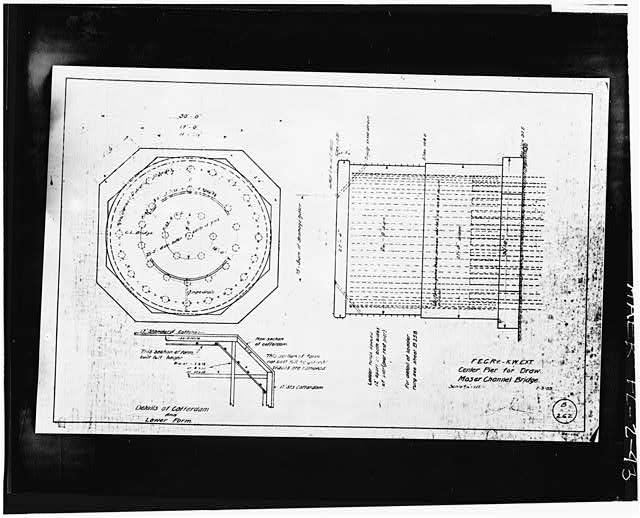
Detail of Moser Channel Bridge Center Pier

Originally known as the Knights Key-Pigeon Key-Moser Channel-Pacet Channel Bridge, the Seven Mile Bridge was constructed from 1909 to 1912 under the direction of Coe as part of the Florida East Coast Railway's Key West Extension, also known as the Overseas Railroad. The logistics of assembling labor and materials and overcoming the difficulties presented by deep water, normal tides and hurricanes attest to the engineering and management skills of those connected with its construction, all under Coe’s leadership and supervision.

The prevalence of devastating hurricanes and heavy seas made it imperative that the structure be unusually strong. First, the positions of the piers were charted under Coe’s direction; then dredgers scooped the sand from the sea's bed, exposing the coral rock necessary for foundations. Next, tugs towed up coffer-dams, huge steel cylinders, which were lowered over the dredged positions. Floating pile-drivers then drove steel-pointed piles into the coral rock until they were securely fixed. Through this method of working there was less risk of the piles slipping owing to shifting of rock, for the constructors were able to determine if the rock was solid or unstable and crumbling.

After the sinking of the piles, concrete was dumped upon the sea bed to a depth of 5 ft., forming the real basis for the piers. Molds were used for the shaping of the reinforced concrete arches and great precautions taken to obviate cracks set up by expansion. The rubble for the concrete was blasted out of the coral, and lifted onto floating platforms, where it was flung into large mechanical mixers.

When the track passed over shallow water travelling excavators were utilized to form a solid embankment of debris. Pipe-lines were laid down in some places along the center of the permanent way, and the ballast pumped through these conduits was deposited where required, the water draining off. The drying and draining of these embankments took a long while owing to the saturated state of the soil.

Coe determined that the destructive force of the waves lay not in their impact against the bank, but in their retreat or undertow, which dragged away and undermined it. Experiment proved that a smooth surface, over which the heavy seas might glide and in their retreat find no hold, offered the best solution to the problem. Material for such a coating was discovered in the marine marl deposits along the line. This form of clay spread over the surface of the embankments, hardened on exposure to the air, and was capable of withstanding the heaviest seas.

The railhead approached Knight's Key itself in February, 1908. Operations then ceased temporarily while the builders considered how the seven miles of sea, varying from 18 to 22 ft. deep, should be overcome. Owing to the impossibility of dumping for an embankment, Coe decided to build a viaduct. This Knight's Key Bridge is the longest single structure in the whole Key West Extension, stretching seven miles across open sea. From one end of it the distant shore is barely visible. Due to the depth of the water, huge steel girders mounted on concrete piers were used. The bridge comprised 316 80-ft. spans, 19 60-ft. spans and 210 53-ft. concrete arches at the southern end where shallower water was found. The track itself lay 30 ft. above the low tide water mark. At the point where the lines ran across Moser Channel a swing bridge, approximately 250 ft. in length, was introduced to allow the passage of shipping.

At Bahia Honda, there was another strip of open sea, where depths of 30 ft. were encountered, and this presented an even greater obstacle than the Knight's Key section. Bahia Honda has a total length of just over a mile. Here Coe decided that another bridge had to be constructed, having 13 spans, each 128 ft. long, 13 spans of 186 ft., and one more of 247 ft. In addition there are nine arches of 80-foot span.

When the work on bridges began beyond Knight's Key, Coe outsourced the setting of the steel to various contractors. As this method proved unsuccessful, the operations were put exclusively in the hands of Coe's own men. The deck girder spans were brought to the piers on barges, and were then lifted and set in place by floating derricks. The railway gangers completed their tasks in less than half the time taken by the contractors. On one occasion, six spans were placed in position within four hours, while on another the laborers erected a span in twenty minutes. The Bahia Honda bridge was built by means of temporary timber framework and an overhead travelling crane. The precautions taken to ensure the workers' safety were such that not a life was lost during the erection of the 32,900 ft. of steel that went to the building of Knight's Key and Bahia Honda bridges.

But even these two great bridges did not suffice. Before the island of Key West could be reached by the railway, yet another 2,500 odd feet had to be traversed, and Coe decided that a viaduct would be best for this remaining part of the route.

Coe had yet another problem in the adequate protection of the vast quantities of steelwork in the bridges from the effects of oxidization caused by exposure to salt water. The excessively moist air of Florida also rusts metal within a short space of time. Experiments to discover the most suitable rust-proof paint had been numerous, based, for the most part, on the anti-fouling compositions of red-lead similar to that used on ships' keels. The rails are also exposed to the rapid corrosion set up by the saturated air and are treated with a special protective covering.

Despite the tropical storms and hurricanes which abound in this part of the world, the extension has successfully withstood the most violent attacks which the ruthless fury of nature can unloose. One of the worst hurricanes experienced beat down upon the works in 1906. Coe, who had been carefully observing atmospheric conditions, noted an approaching disturbance, and the governmental observatory also gave him due warning. The builders, however, had received a false alarm in 1905 and did not take sufficient heed The storm swept mercilessly upon the workings. The gangers scurried to the frail shelter of their floating quarters on the barges. The houseboats were torn loose from their moorings; some were driven out into the fury of the raging sea, while others were flung and shattered against the keys and reefs. Passing steamers rescued many survivors after days of exposure, but more than seventy men were lost.

In 1909, another hurricane reached a velocity of 125 miles an hour. This time, warning instructions were observed and the barges towed into safety beforehand. Although miles of embankment were washed away no real damage was done to the concrete work. Five girders on Knight's Key Bridge were blown from their piers due to the failure of the contractors to put in the necessary number of anchor bolts. A study of the destructive force of these storms was responsible for many radical changes in construction plans, and as a result the present work is practically storm proof.

Some remarkable figures give an idea of the vast amount of work involved in the construction of the Key West extension. The project from beginning to end meant the assembling of 38,000 tons of structural steel, 461,000 cubic yards of concrete; the transport and distribution of 800,000 barrels of cement, 96,000 tons of rock, 78,000 tons of gravel, and 300,000 cubic yards of coralline rock. In addition to this the constructors had to shift some 2,000 tons of reinforced steel, 70,000 pine piles, and approximately 100,000 tons of spoil for filling in shallows and making up embankments.

The longest and in some respects the most imposing of all structures on the Key West Extension from an engineering standpoint was the Knights Key-Pigeon Key-Moser Channel-Pacet Channel Bridge, later commonly known as the Seven Mile Bridge. Three years were required to complete this huge structure. Work began in the spring of 1909 and was completed in January, 1912. The bridge was 35,815 feet in length, and consisted of 335 80-foot and 60-foot deck plate girder steel spans, rested on concrete piers, and a concrete viaduct, consisting of 210 53-foot arches and a drawbridge 253 feet in length. Altogether, the bridge rested upon 546 concrete foundation piers, far exceeding the number in any other railway bridge in the world. Each of the piers in the main structure rested on bedrock, in some cases as much as 28 feet below the water line.

=== Magnitude of Coe’s engineering accomplishment ===
The railroad to Key West continued in operation for 23 years until on Labor Day, 1935, one of the most destructive hurricanes that ever visited the Florida Keys inflicted severe damage to a great number of miles of embankment and track—not, however, to the great steel and concrete bridge structures that formed the vital part of the project, including the Seven Mile Bridge.

The building of Key West ranks as one of the greatest achievements in railway engineering. There were no precedents to follow in building the Key West Extension, especially the Seven Mile Bridge portion. Coe developed methods of construction to meet untried conditions, and those methods proved successful. Most of the Key West extension still withstands nature.

In January 1912, when it was completed, the Seven Mile Bridge, linking the Florida Keys to Marathon, Monroe County, was acclaimed as the longest bridge in the world, an engineering marvel. It was the most costly of all Flagler's bridges in the Key West Extension. From 1912 until portions of the Extension were destroyed by a hurricane in 1935, the Key West Extension served as the one and only vital link between Miami and Key West.

=== Legacy of Seven Mile Bridge construction feat ===
The Overseas Highway is a 113-mile (181.9 km) highway carrying U.S. Route 1 (US 1) through the Florida Keys. Large parts of it were built on the former right-of-way of the Overseas Railroad, the Key West Extension of the Florida East Coast Railway. Completed in 1912, the Overseas Railroad was heavily damaged and partially destroyed in the Labor Day Hurricane of 1935. The Florida East Coast Railway was financially unable to rebuild the destroyed sections, so the roadbed and remaining bridges were sold to the state of Florida for $640,000.

In effect, owner and founder Flager’s money and Coe’s engineering genius provided private money and engineering expertise to pay for and design the public infrastructure that became U.S. Route 1. It is doubtful if the highway would ever have been laid out and built if the Florida East Coast Railway had not planned, designed and built the route and bridge infrastructure that were subsequently used to construct the original highway.

== War service and later career ==
After the Key West Extension was completed, Coe was named Engineer Maintenance of Way for the railroad, a position he held until he volunteered for military service in 1917.

At the outbreak of World War I, at the age of 51, Coe enlisted as captain of Company A, 17th U.S. Engineers, commanded by Col. Charles G. Dawes (later the 30th Vice President of the United States (1925–29)) and succeeded General Dawes, as colonel. After the war, President Herbert C. Hoover recommended Coe to the King of Serbs, Croats and Slovenes as an adviser, and Coe spent two years rebuilding the Balkan railroads.

Coe was appointed the first city manager of Miami in 1921. In 1922, he was appointed county engineer of Duval County, Florida.

Later, he returned to France and oversaw the dredging of the harbor and the construction of the great docks and terminals the Port of Bordeaux.

From 1936 to 1939, Coe was in charge of the public housing program in Miami and built one set of over 750 housing units for African-American residents of the city.

== Awards ==
Coe received the following decorations: Chevalier Legion of Honor of France; Order of the White Eagle (Serbia); Order of St. Xavier; Order of the Black Eagle; and (conferred by General John J. Pershing) the Order of the Purple Heart. The United States Congress adopted resolutions recognizing Coe’s services.

== Personal life ==
In 1891, Coe married Luela Joy. The couple had five children.

Coe died at age 73, on March 5, 1939, in St. Augustine, Florida, and was buried in St. Augustine National Cemetery.

== Additional links ==
- "History and Background: Construction of the Old Bridge," by Dan Gallagher, Ph.D
