= Pigeon Key =

Small island in Florida, United States

- Pigeon Key Historic District
- U.S. National Register of Historic Places
- U.S. Historic district
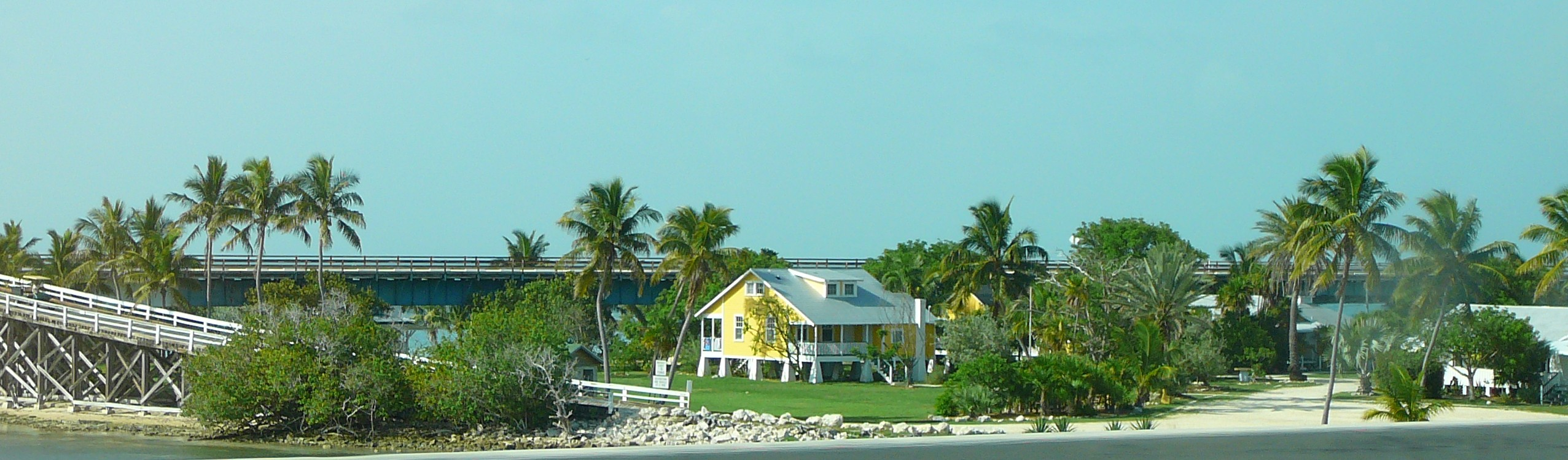
- Pigeon Key seen from the Seven Mile Bridge..

- Location within Florida Location within the United States
- Location: Off US 1 at mile marker 45, Monroe County, Florida
- Nearest city: Marathon
- Coordinates: 24.703991°N 81.155308°W
- Area: 5 acres (2.0 ha)
- Built: 1912
- Architectural style: Vernacular Frame
- NRHP reference No.: 90000443
- Added to NRHP: March 16, 1990

Pigeon Key is a small island containing the historic district of Pigeon Key, Florida. The 5-acre (2.0-hectare) island is home to 8 buildings on the National Register of Historic Places. The former Assistant Bridge Tender's House has been converted into a small museum featuring artifacts and images from Pigeon Key's past. It is located off the old Seven Mile Bridge, at approximately mile marker 45, west of Knight's Key, (city of Marathon in the middle Florida Keys) and just east of Moser Channel.

Buildings remaining from the era of Henry Flagler's Overseas Railroad Key West Extension between 1908 and 1912 are now part of the Pigeon Key Historic District.

Much of the 1978 television film Hunters of the Reef was shot on Pigeon Key. Pigeon Key was one of the locations for the "Bal Harbor Institute" in the 1995 series of Flipper. It was seen in three episodes during season one including the pilot episode. It was also the site of the Finish Line of The Amazing Race 18 "Unfinished Business" in 2011.

== Pigeon Key Historic District ==
The Pigeon Key Historic District is a U.S. historic district (designated as such on March 16, 1990) located on Pigeon Key in Florida. The district is off U.S. 1 at mile marker 45. It contains 11 historic buildings and 3 structures. The old Seven Mile Bridge (closed to vehicular traffic) crosses over the island and has a pedestrian exit ramp going to the island.
