= Aurelio Grisanty =

Dominican-American painter

Aurelio "Rail" Grisanty
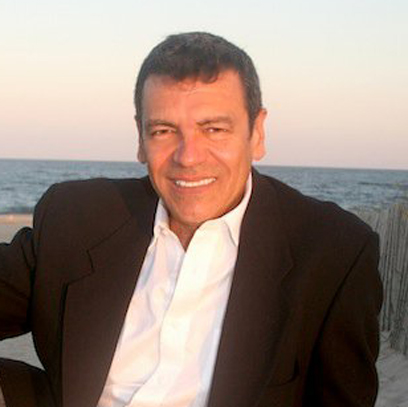
- Born: Aurelio Grisanty; 1949 (age 76–77); Dominican Republic
- Education: Studied drawing with Yoryi Morel; Studied interior design at the Universidad Nacional Pedro Henríquez Ureña
- Known for: Painting, graphic design; interior/set design and costume design
- Notable work: Beach Town Posters
- Awards: Declared “Exceptional Individual of International Renown” by the U.S. government, 1997

Aurelio "Rail" Grisanty (born 1949 in the Dominican Republic) is a Dominican-born American painter, graphic artist, muralist, set and costume designer, entrepreneur, and the principal artist of the Beach Town Posters ongoing series of vintage Art Deco-style prints.

== Early life and education ==
Grisanty was born under politically oppressive circumstances in the Dominican Republic. As a child, he spent hours in his grandparents' garden observing colors, textures and lighting. Grisanty wrote: "There, I learned how green is shaded by red. How, without direct light, yellows become brown. How purple unveils its reds and blues in a transparency. And black does not exist. I learned that small things can make a big context and vice versa. I learned that the character of man is as complex as Nature."

As a teenager, Grisanty studied drawing with Dominican artist Yoryi Morel from 1963 to 1964, studied graphic arts and painting in Mexico City from 1969 to 1974, and studied interior design at the Universidad Nacional Pedro Henríquez Ureña in Santo Domingo, Dominican Republic.

== Career ==
From 1974 to 1976, Grisanty designed and directed the Graphic Arts Department at the Universidad Autónoma de Santo Domingo. At the time, he became involved in designing theatrical sets and costumes in Santo Domingo, most notably for a production of Salome, directed by cinematographer Jean-Louis Jorge. Grisanty then served as the director for the graphic-design department of the advertising agency Retho Publicidad in Santo Domingo.

Grisanty moved to Washington, D.C., in 1984 and pursued a career as a painter and graphic artist. He moved to Rehoboth Beach, Delaware, in 2004. One year later, he co-founded Beach Town Posters, a series of fine-art posters celebrating American beach towns, rendered in a vintage Art Deco style. The inspiration for Beach Town Posters came from the French vacation posters that decorated his childhood beach home. Grisanty is the sole artist for the ongoing series.

Grisanty has won a series of awards for his stage and costume design and individual artworks. His notable career achievements include winning the Special Prize from the Jury at the Santo Domingo Art Biennial in 1976, and being declared an "Exceptional Individual of International Renown" during his citizenship process by the U.S. government in 1997.

=== Individual exhibits ===
- 1974 – Centro Cultural Dominicano, Santo Domingo
- 1979 – Centro de La Cultura, Santiago, Dominican Republic
- 1979 – Museo de las Casas Reales, Santo Domingo
- 1981 – Puerto Plata Art, Dominican Republic
- 1982 – Altos de Chavon, La Romana, Donminican Republic
- 1982 – Casa de La Cultura Hispanica, Santo Domingo
- 1983 – Centro de Arte Nouveau, Santo Domingo
- 1986 – La Galeria, Santo Domingo
- 1987 – Cameron Cobb Gallery, Atlanta, Georgia
- 1988 – Cameron Cobb Gallery, Atlanta, Georgia
- 1988 – La Galeria, Santo Domingo
- 1989 – Carlton Cobb Gallery, Atlanta, Georgia
- 1990 – Lowe Gallery, Atlanta, Georgia
- 1992 – Museo National de Arte Moderno, Santo Domingo
- 1995 – Museo de las Casas Reales, Santo Domingo
- 2002 – Artist's Museum, Washington, D.C.
- 2009 – Gallery 50, Rehoboth Beach, Delaware

=== Group and museum exhibits ===
- 1976 – Museo del Hombre Dominicano
- 1977 – Michigan Council for the Arts
- 1981 – Museum of Modern Art, Santo Domingo
- 1983 – Valparaiso Biennial, Chile
- 1985 – University of Pittsburgh, Pennsylvania
- 1988 – Cuban Museum of Art, Miami, Florida
- 1991 – IDB, Nagoya, Japan
- 1993 – Mexican Cultural Institute, Washington, D.C.
- 1994 – AT&T, Washington, D.C.
- 1994 – Brazilian Cultural Institute, Washington, D.C.
- 1996 – George Mason University, Virginia
- 1998 – Ada Balcacer Gallery, Santo Domingo
- 1998 – Mexican Cultural Institute, Washington, D.C.

== See also ==
- List of American artists 1900 and after
- List of Dominican painters
- List of people from Delaware
- List of people from Washington, D.C.
