= Little Duck Key =

Island in the lower Florida Keys, United States

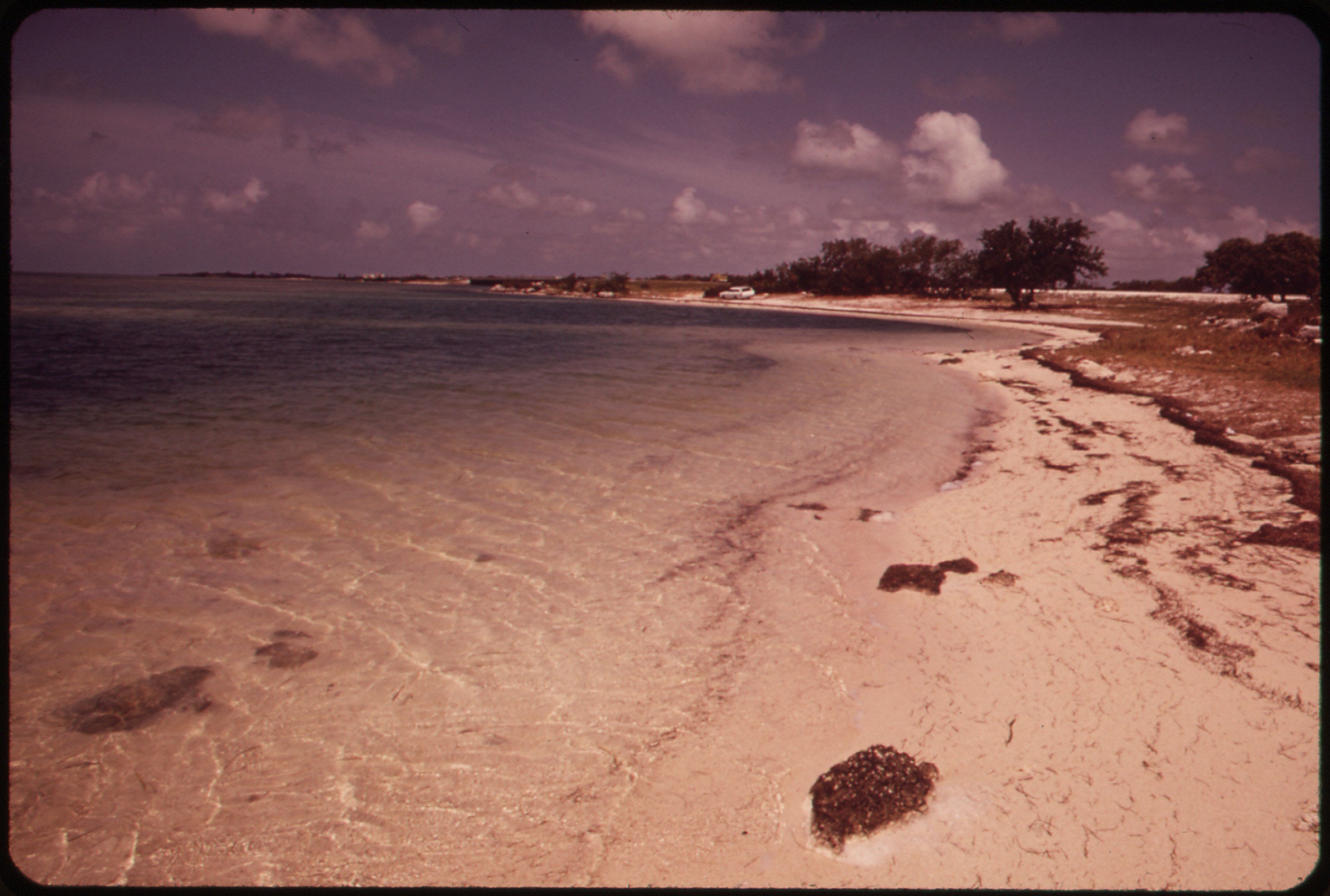
- Little Duck Key, 1973

- Little Duck Key Little Duck Key (the Caribbean)

Geography
- Location: Gulf of Mexico
- Coordinates: 24.681084°N 81.231998°W
- Archipelago: Florida Keys
- Adjacent to: Florida Straits

Administration
- United States
- State: Florida
- County: Monroe

Little Duck Key is a small island in the lower Florida Keys.

== Coordinates ==
U.S. 1 (or the Overseas Highway) crosses the key at approximately mile marker 40, just west of the Seven Mile Bridge.The west end of the bridge terminates on this island.

== Name history ==
The island which is marked on current navigation charts as Little Duck Key is part of a complex name history of all the islands located on and near the highway between Pigeon Key and Bahia Honda Key. The key was always known locally as Pacet Key and was given the name Little Duck Key during the construction of the Overseas Railroad. It has also been known as Big Money Key. At one point, the island now known as Ohio Key was called Little Duck Key.

== Features ==
The island has a small beach picnic area and boat ramps.
