= Knights Key =

Island in the middle Florida Keys, United States

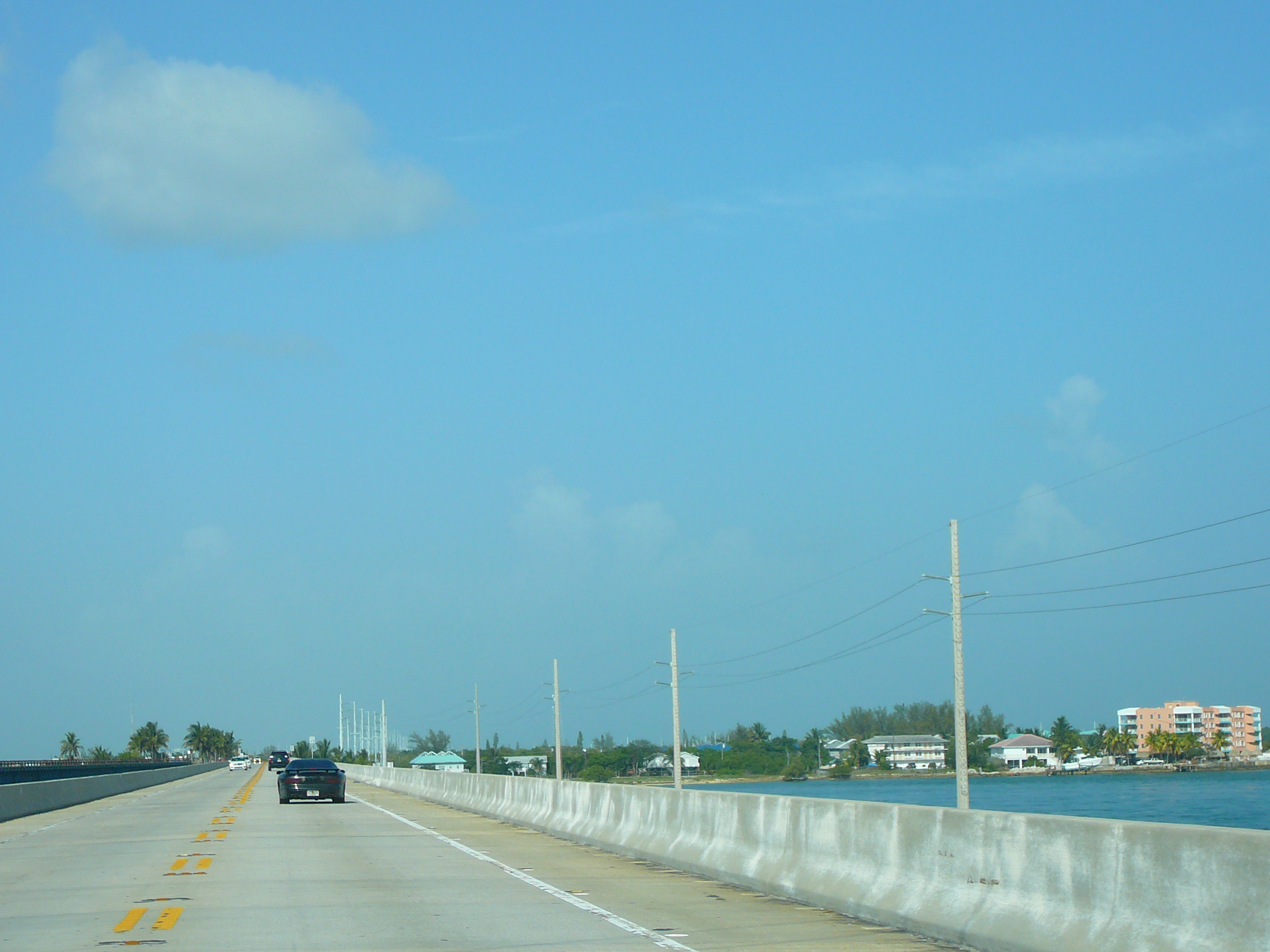
- Knights Key

- Knights Key Knights Key (the Caribbean)

Geography
- Location: Gulf of Mexico
- Coordinates: 24.707°N 81.121°W

Administration
- United States
- State: Florida
- County: Monroe

Knights Key is an island in the middle Florida Keys, located entirely within the borders of the city of Marathon, Florida.

== Geography ==
U.S. 1 (or the Overseas Highway) crosses the key near mile marker 47, at the western end of Key Vaca and eastern end of the Seven Mile Bridge.

== History ==
Before the Key West extension of the Overseas Railroad was completed, Knights Key was the end of the line and a major seaport existed there. A U.S. Post Office was established there in 1908, and operated until June, 1912. A United States Coast and Geodetic Survey field report written in 1935-1936 states: "The key was named after the original settler and is called locally Knights Key."

The campground and "village" at Knights Key were developed by the Kyle family in the 1960s.

Knights Key was a key filming site in the 1989 James Bond film "Licence to Kill" as well as the 1992 Arnold Schwarzenegger film "True Lies," and 1994’s Drop Zone, starring Wesley Snipes.
