= Moser Channel =

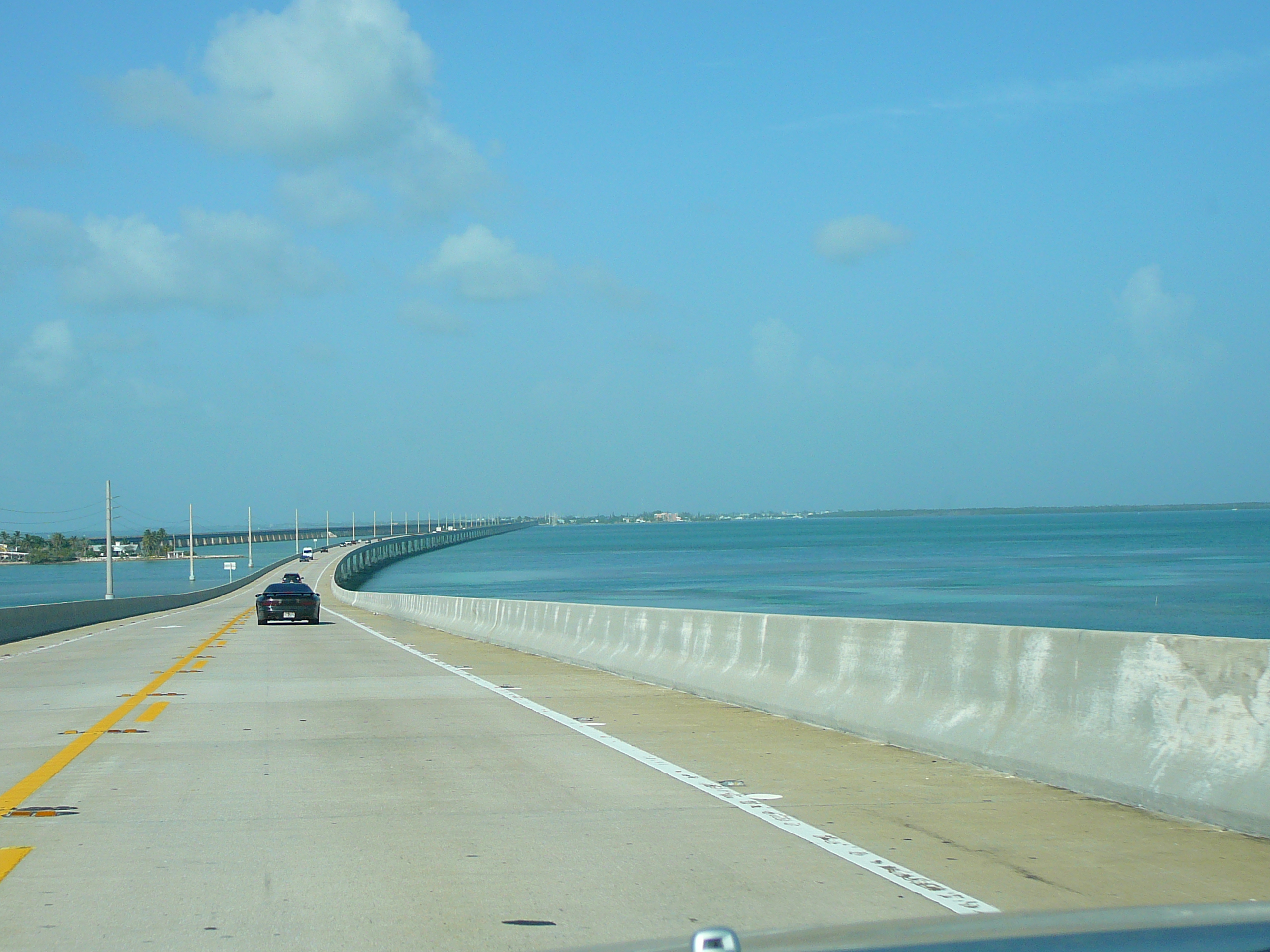
East view from the top of the Moser Channel arc of the Seven Mile Bridge

Moser Channel is the deepest passage spanned by the Seven Mile Bridge and is one of four predominant passages in the Florida Keys which allow exchange of waters to the north and west of the Keys (including Florida Bay and the Gulf of Mexico) with the Atlantic waters of Hawk Channel and the Florida Reef to the south and east. Moser Channel has an orientation perpendicular to the bridge. The other three Keys passages important to the exchange of south Florida coastal waters are Long Key Channel, Channel 5, and Channel 2.
