= Seven Mile Bridge =

Bridge in Florida, United States of America

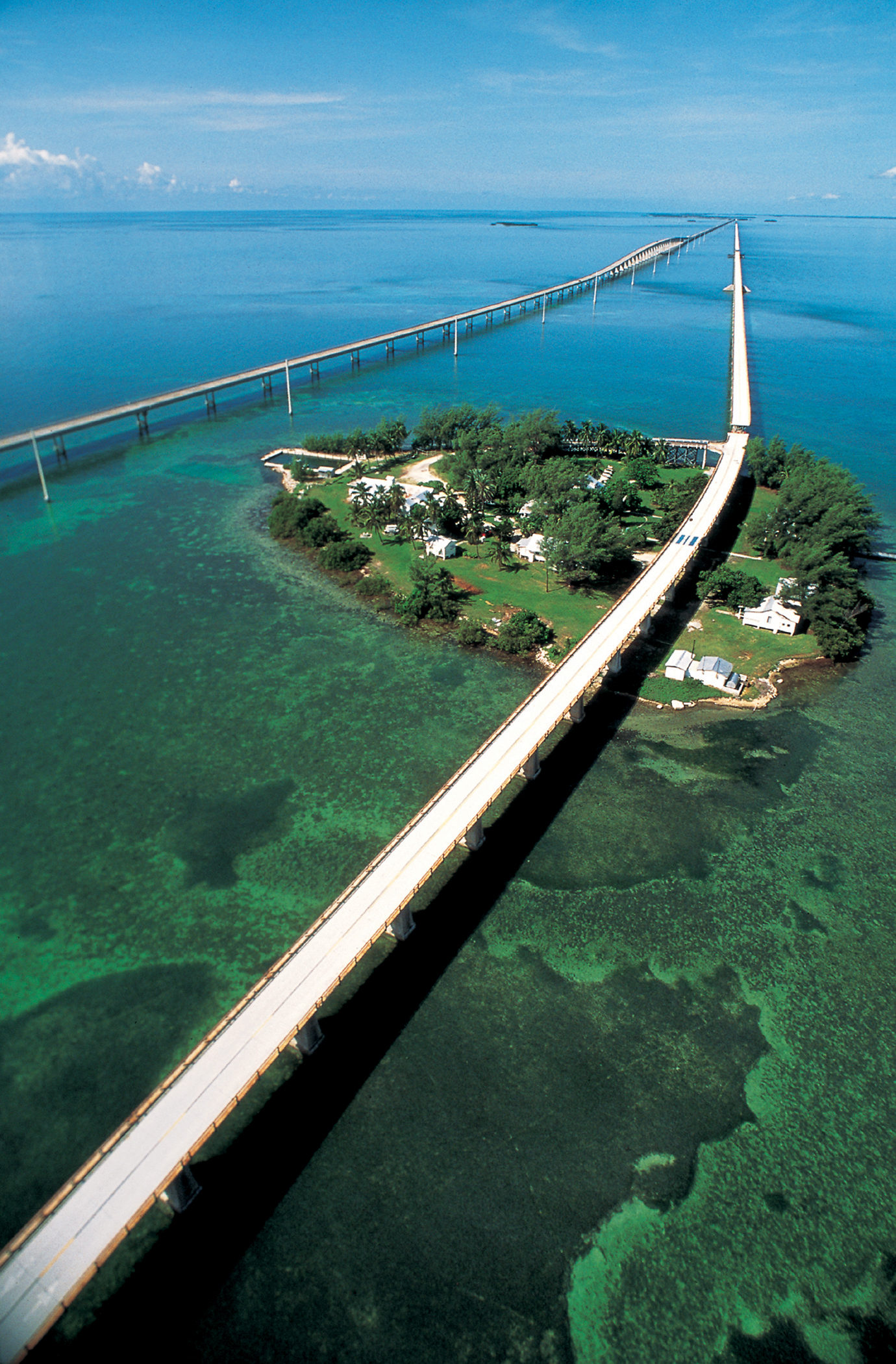
- Seven Mile Bridge with the original in the foreground
- Coordinates: 24.6982°N 81.1767°W
- Carries: 2 lanes of US 1
- Crosses: Moser Channel
- Locale: Florida Keys, Monroe County, Florida
- Maintained by: Florida Department of Transportation
- ID number: 900101

Characteristics
- Design: Precast segmented box girder bridge
- Total length: 35,719.2 feet 6.765 miles (10.887 km)
- Width: 38 feet (12 m)
- Longest span: 135 feet (41 m)
- Clearance below: 65 feet (20 m)

History
- Construction cost: $45 million (equivalent to $127 million in 2025 dollars)
- Opened: May 24, 1982

Location
- Interactive map of Seven Mile Bridge

The Seven Mile Bridge is a bridge in the Florida Keys, in Monroe County, Florida, United States. It connects Knight's Key (part of the city of Marathon, Florida) in the Middle Keys to Little Duck Key in the Lower Keys. Among the longest bridges in existence when it was built, it is part of the Overseas Highway in the Keys, which is part of the 2,369-mile (3,813 km) U.S. Route 1.

There are two bridges in this location. The modern bridge is open to vehicular traffic; the older one only to pedestrians and cyclists. The older bridge, originally known as the Knights Key-Pigeon Key-Moser Channel-Pacet Channel Bridge, was constructed from 1909 to 1912 under the direction of Henry Flagler and Clarence S. Coe as part of the Florida East Coast Railway's Key West Extension, also known as the Overseas Railroad.

== History ==
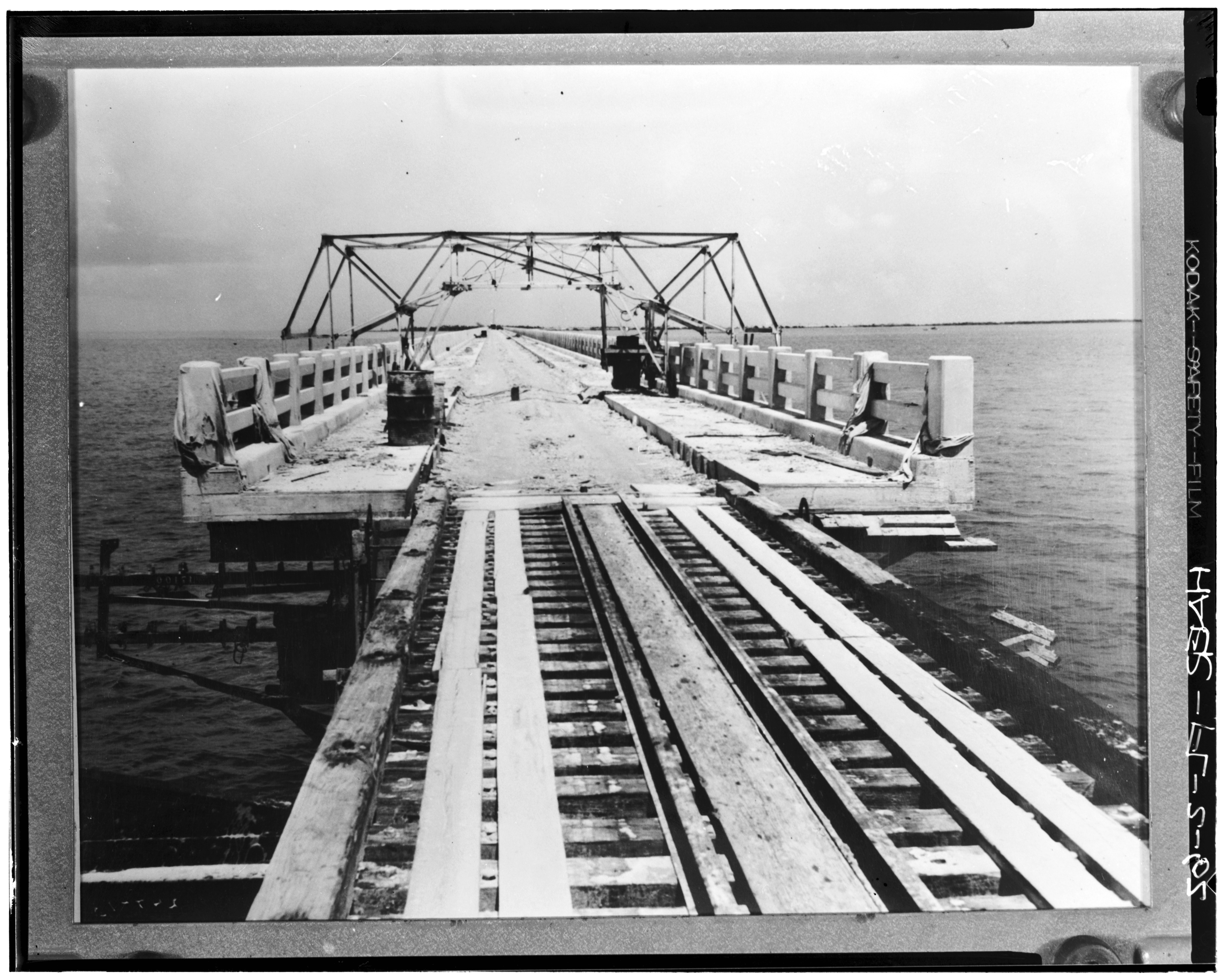
Highway surface being constructed over railroad superstructure

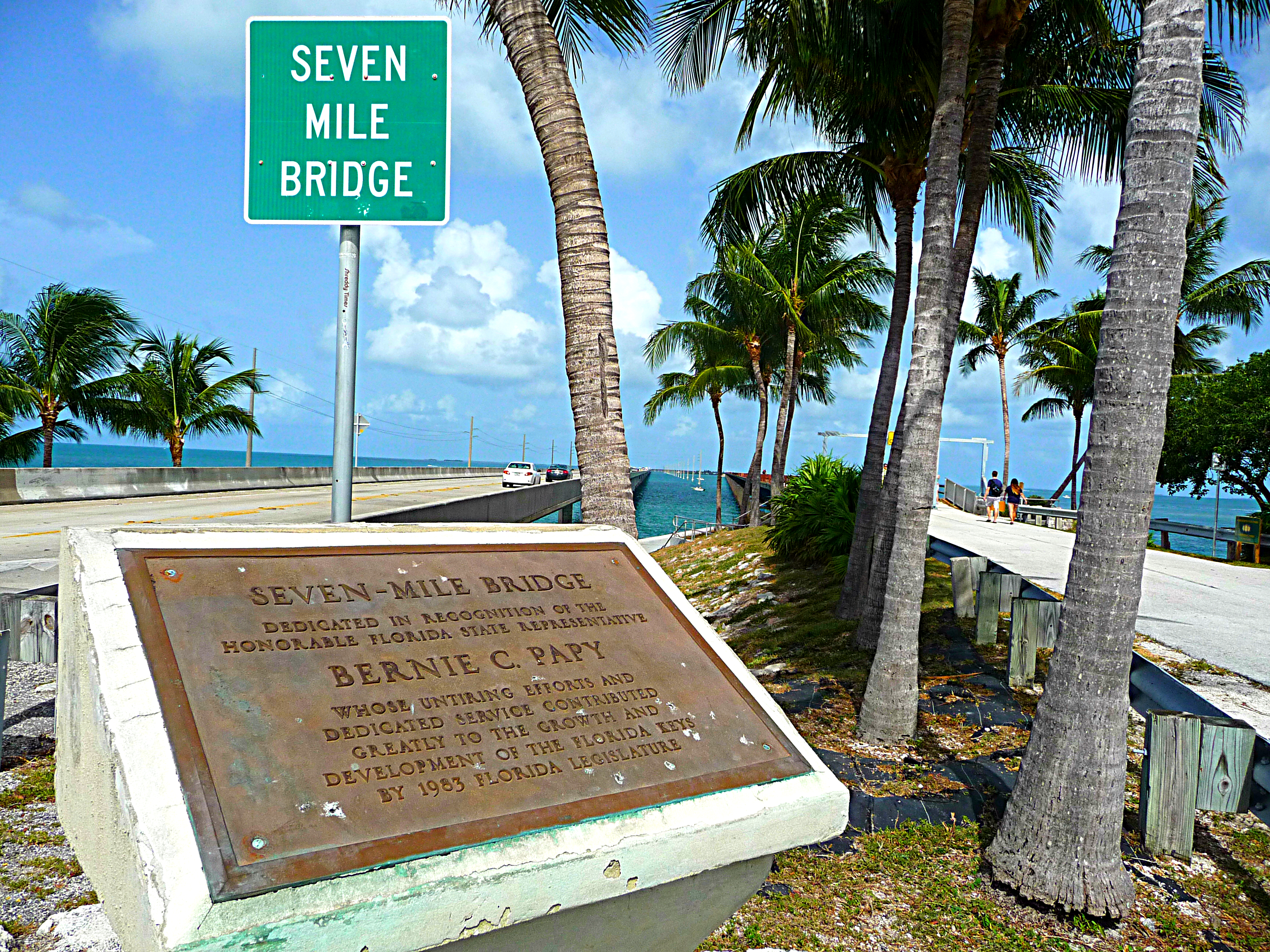
Entrance plaque

After the railroad was damaged by the Labor Day Hurricane of 1935, the line was sold to the United States government, which refurbished Seven Mile Bridge for automobile use. Unsupported sections were added in 1935 to widen it for vehicular traffic. Dismantled trackage was recycled, painted white, and used as guardrails. It had a swing span to allow passage of boats in the Moser Channel of the Intracoastal Waterway into Hawk Channel, near where the bridge crosses Pigeon Key, a small island that held a work camp for Flagler's railroad. Hurricane Donna in 1960 caused further damage. The current road bridge was constructed from 1978 to 1982.

The vast majority of the original bridge still exists, although the swing span has been removed. The 2.2-mile (3.5 km) section to Pigeon Key, used as a fishing pier and long open to motorized vehicles to give access to the key, was closed to motorized traffic in 2008 after the unsupported sections began to sag. In 2014, the Florida Department of Transportation approved a $77 million plan to restore the old bridge. By 2017, the pedestrian section was closed for extensive repairs, and reopened in January 2022.

== Engineering ==
The new bridge is a box-girder structure built from precast, prestressed concrete sections, comprising 440 spans. Near the center, the bridge rises in an arc to provide 65-foot-high (20 m) clearance for boat passage. The remainder of the bridge is considerably closer to the water surface. The new bridge does not cross Pigeon Key.

The total length of the new bridge is actually 35,862 ft (10,931 m) or 6.79 miles (10.93 km), and is shorter than the original. The bridge carries the Florida Keys aqueduct, supplying water to points west, as well as fiber optic cables, providing telecommunications to and from the lower Keys.

Each April, the bridge is closed for about 2.5 hours on a Saturday for the Seven Mile Bridge Run that commemorates the Florida Keys bridge rebuilding project. The event began in 1982 to commemorate the completion of a federally funded bridge building program that replaced spans that oil tycoon Henry Flagler constructed in the early 1900s to serve as a foundation for his Overseas Railroad.

The Seven Mile Bridge was engineered by Figg & Muller Engineers (who also engineered the much taller Sunshine Skyway Bridge). The structure was completed six months ahead of schedule and has earned eight awards, including an Exceptional Award for Cost Savings Innovation from the Federal Highway Administration.

== In fiction ==
The bridge has been featured in films and television series, such as Road House, Licence to Kill, True Lies, 2 Fast 2 Furious, and Burn Notice; and is seen in the upcoming video game Grand Theft Auto VI.

== Gallery ==
Original bridge

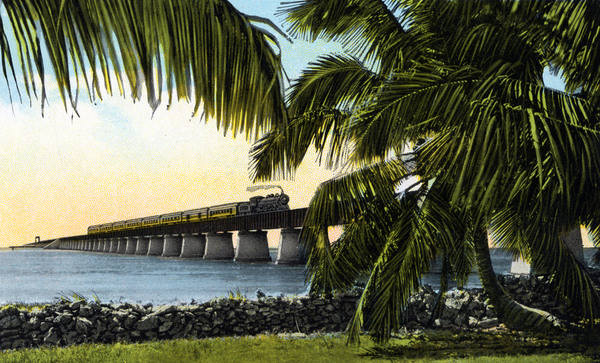
Illustration of FEC train crossing the bridge

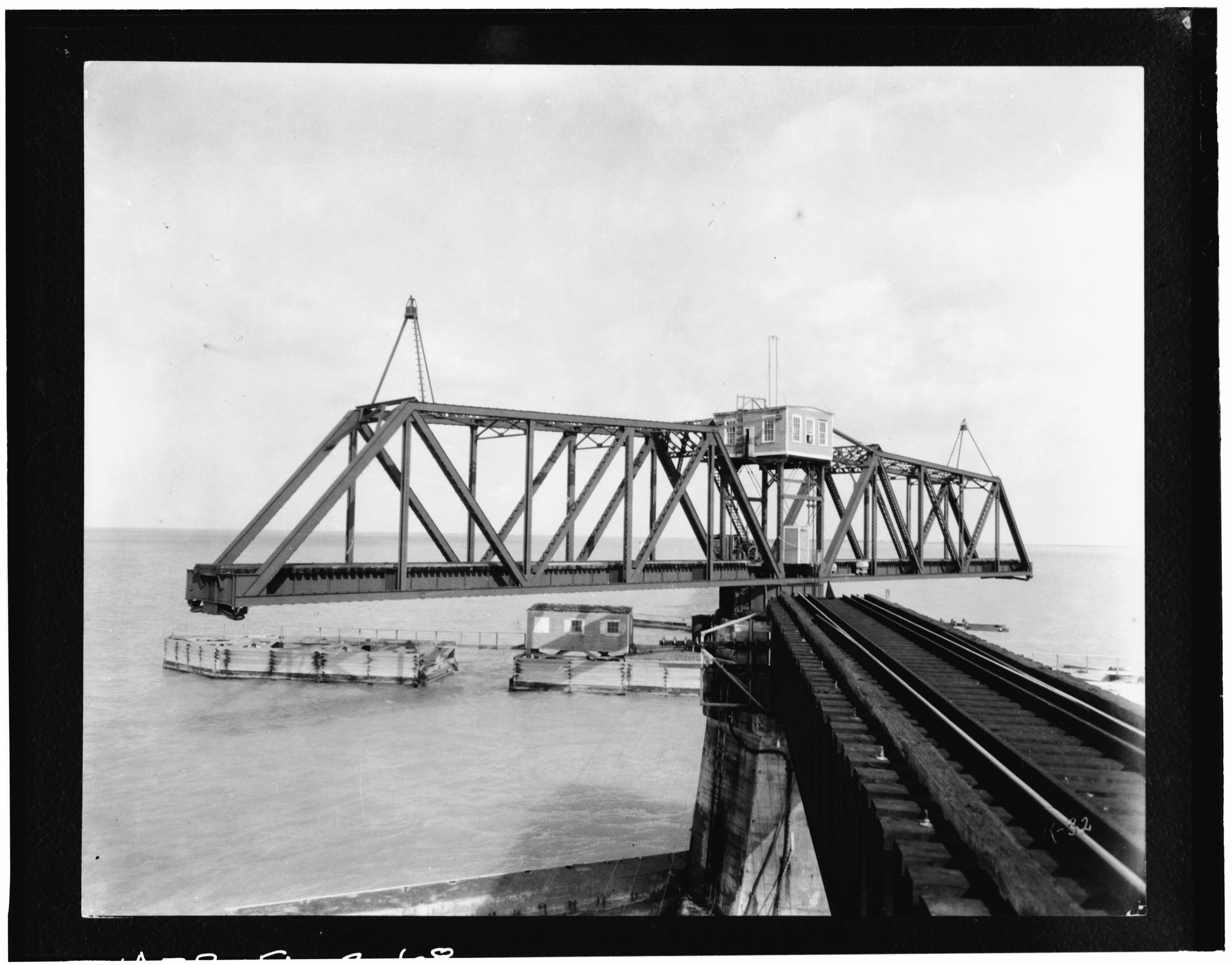
Moser Channel swing span in the railroad-era

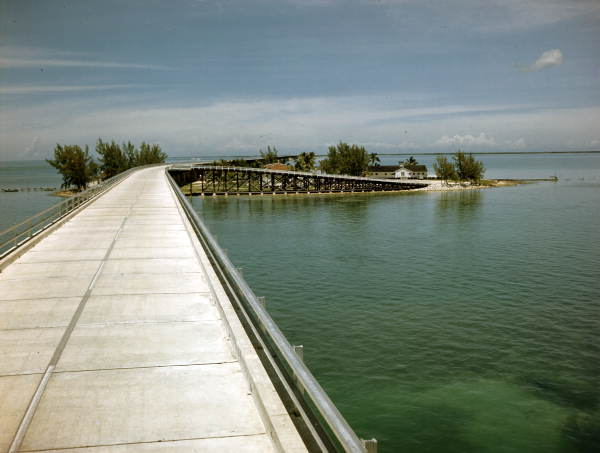
Approaching Pigeon Key post-highway conversion. Guardrails are made up of rails from the former railroad.

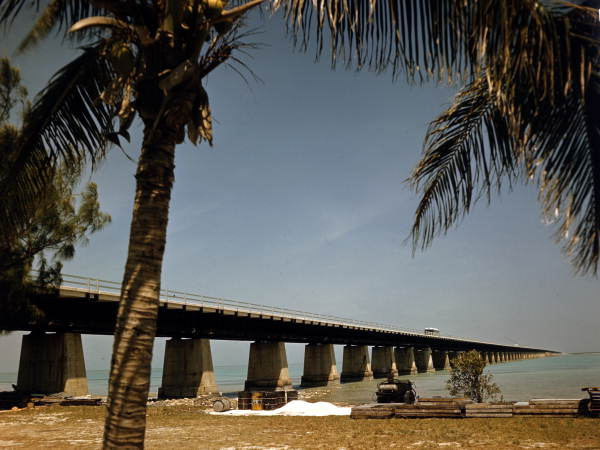
1955 view of the bridge.

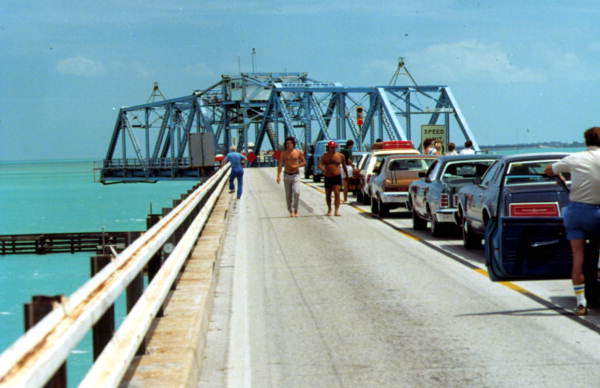
Traffic waiting for the open swing span over Moser Channel.

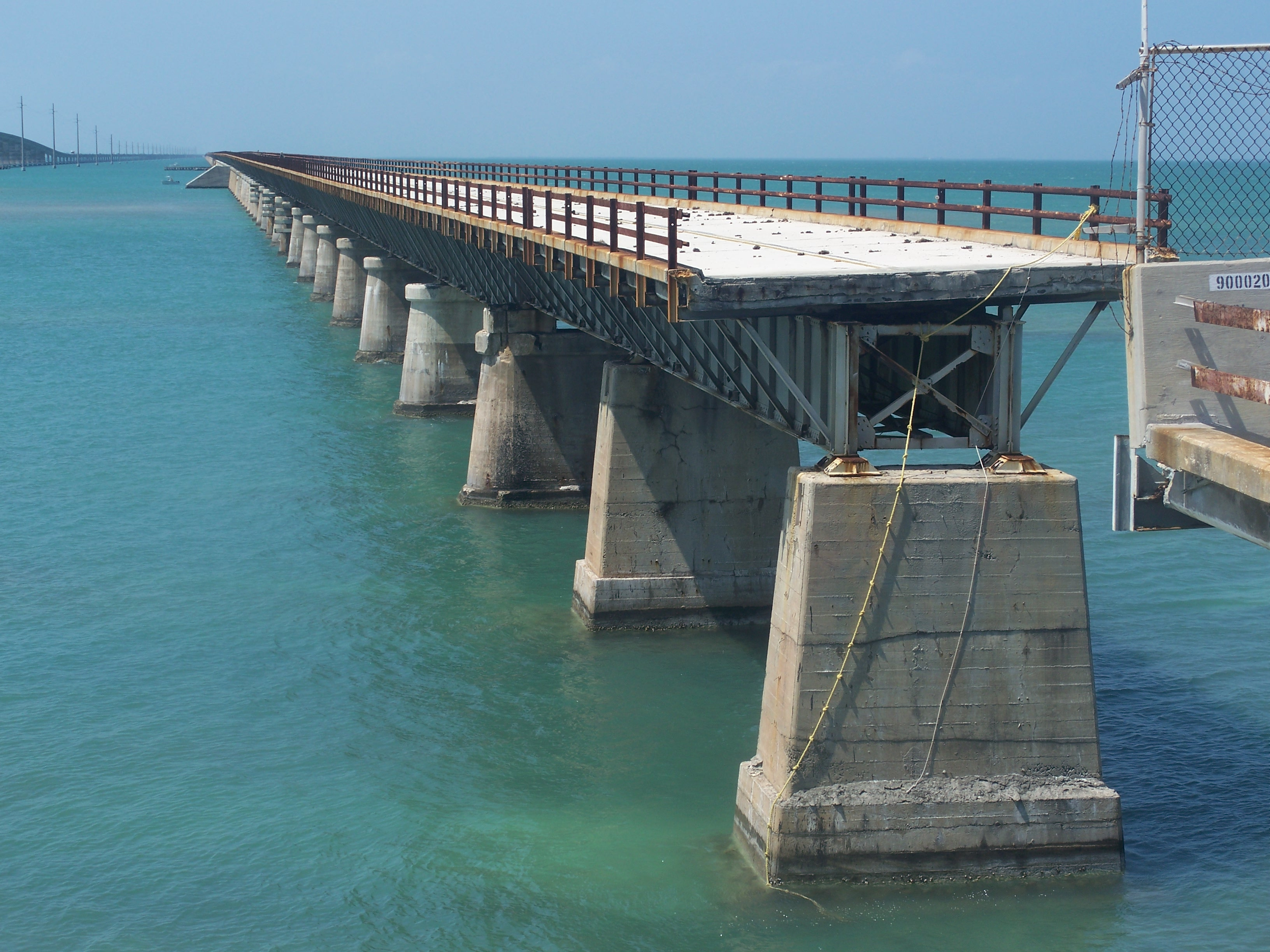
Severed segment after the bridge was closed to traffic.

Current bridge

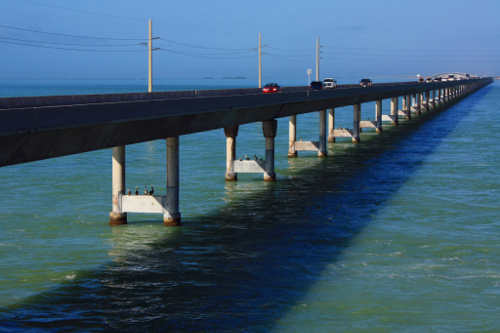
Current bridge

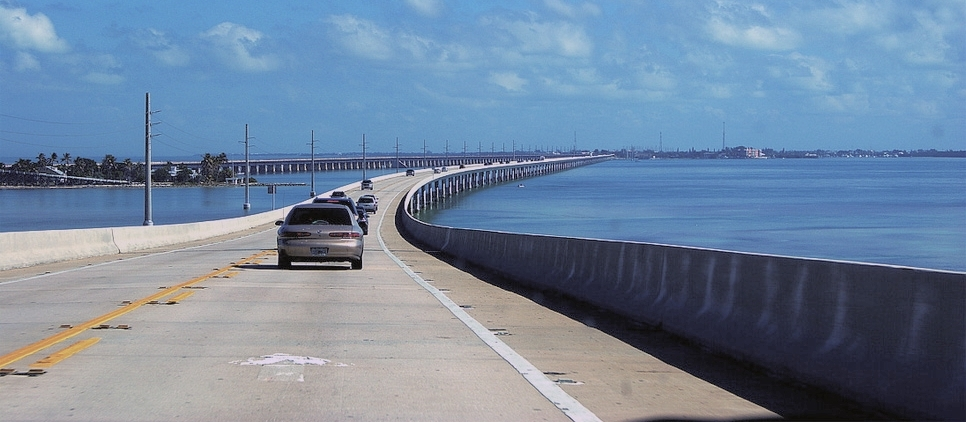
Surface of the current bridge with original bridge and Pigeon Key in the background

== See also ==
- List of bridges documented by the Historic American Engineering Record in Florida
