= Porgy Key =

Small island north of the upper Florida Keys in Biscayne National Park

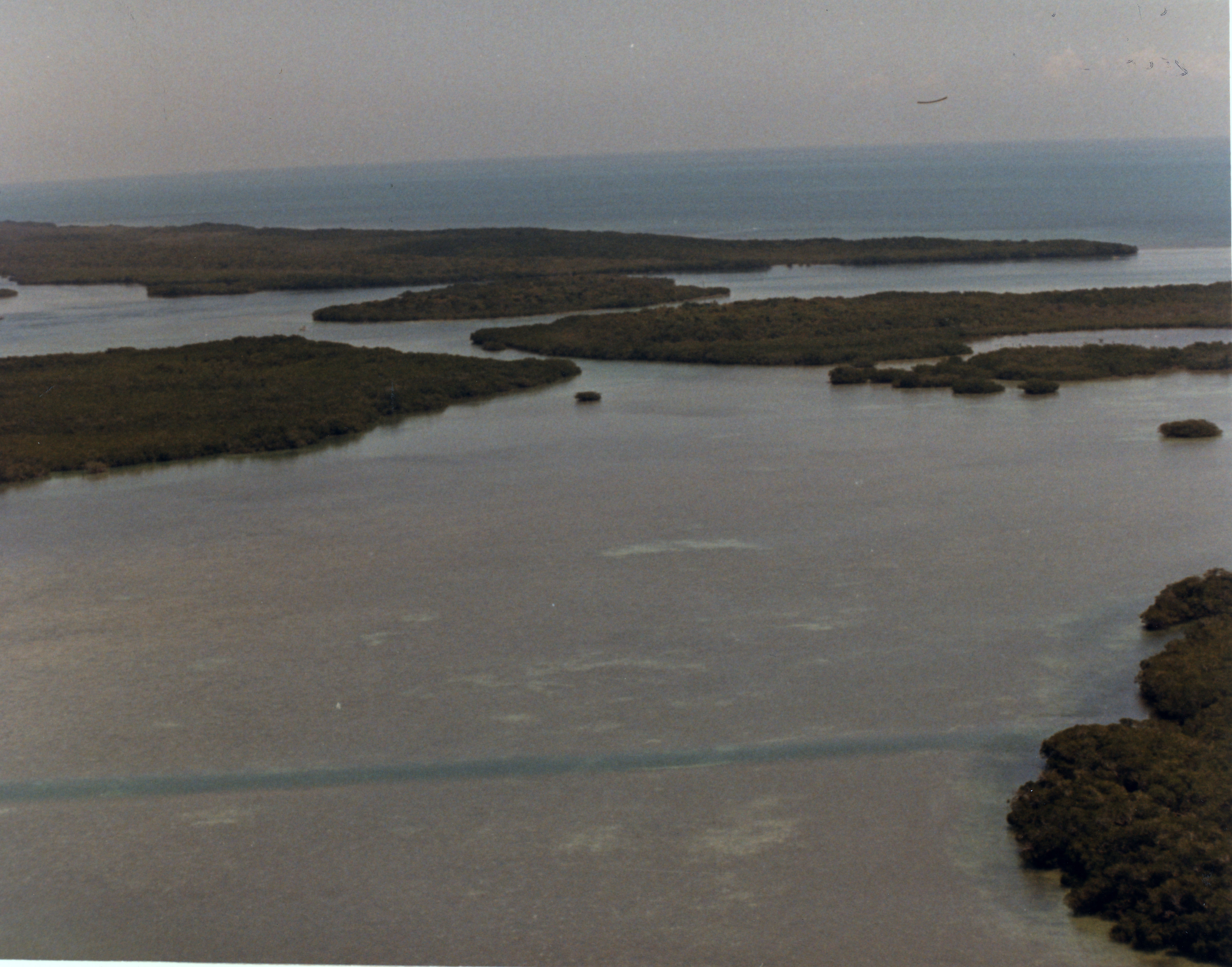
- Aerial view of Reid Key and Porgy Key, October 1987

- Porgy Key Porgy Key (North Atlantic)

Geography
- Location: Atlantic Ocean
- Coordinates: 25°23′21″N 80°14′12″W

Administration
- United States
- State: Florida
- County: Miami-Dade

Porgy Key is a small island north of the upper Florida Keys in Biscayne National Park. It is in Miami-Dade County, Florida.

It is located in southern Biscayne Bay, just north of Old Rhodes Key and Totten Key, just southeast of the southern tip of Elliott Key, and in between Old Rhodes and Reid Keys. It is on the south side of Caesar Creek, the creek that separates Elliott and Old Rhodes Keys.

== History ==
It was earlier known as Porgee Key.

Porgy Key was the home for many years of "Sir" Lancelot Jones (1898–1997), a long-time resident. Hurricane Andrew in 1992 destroyed his former residence.

The Bache Coast Survey of 1861 shows Porgee Key. It is also spelled Porgee in a 1920 Smithsonian Institution study of Cerion snails.
