= Reid Key =

Small island north of the upper Florida Keys in Biscayne National Park

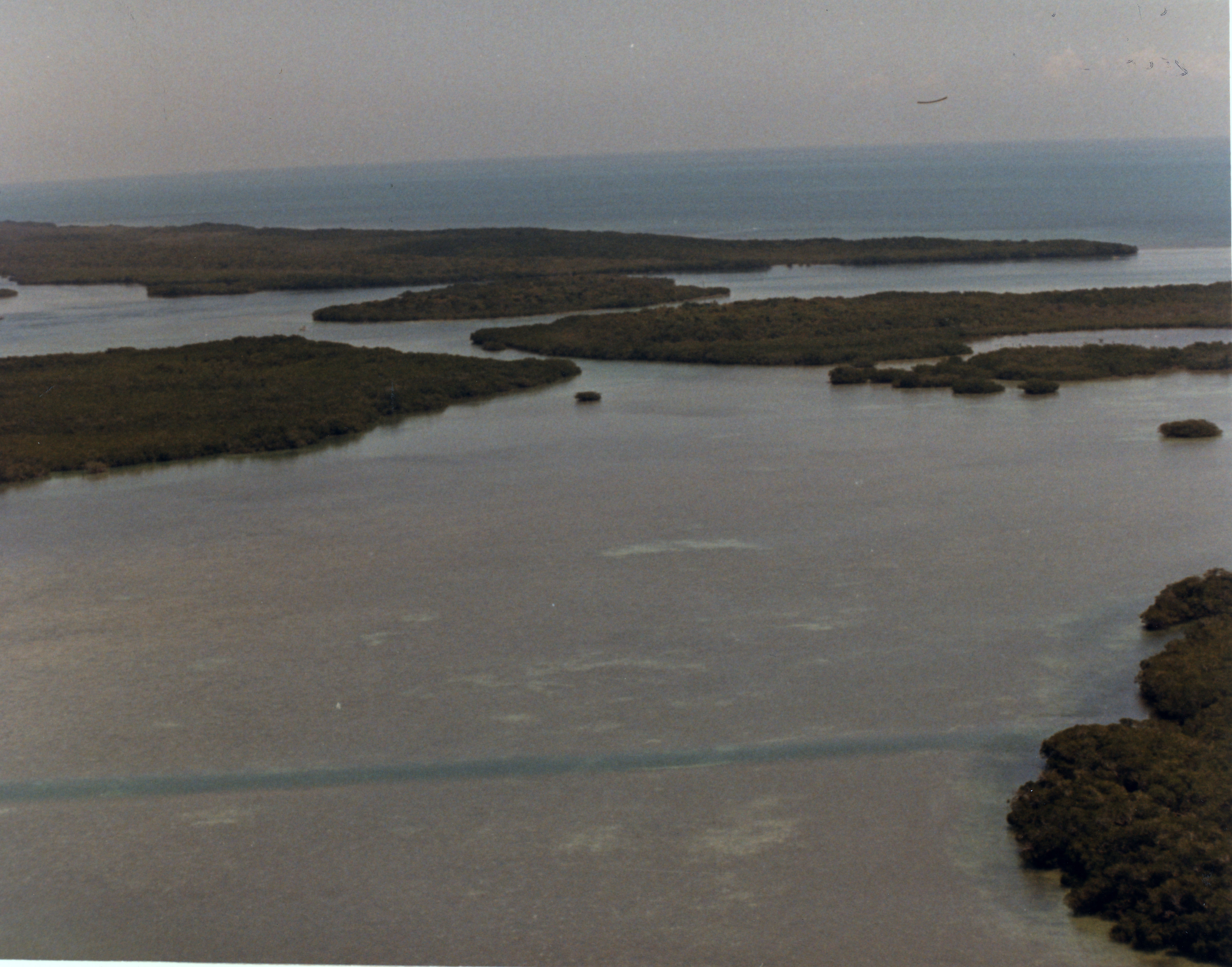
- Aerial view of Reid Key and Porgy Key, October 1987

- Reid Key Reid Key (North Atlantic)

Geography
- Location: Atlantic Ocean
- Coordinates: 25.392779°N 80.240149°W

Administration
- United States
- State: Florida
- County: Miami-Dade

Reid Key is a small island north of the upper Florida Keys in Biscayne National Park. It is in Miami-Dade County, Florida.

It is located in southern Biscayne Bay, just north of Old Rhodes Key and Totten Key, just east of the southern tip of Elliott Key, and in between the Rubicon Keys and Porgy Key. It is on the south side of Caesar Creek, the creek that separates Elliott and Old Rhodes Keys.

== History ==
It was named for an early settler.

The Bache Coast Survey of 1861 shows Reid's Key.
