= Rockland Key =

Island in the lower Florida Keys, United States

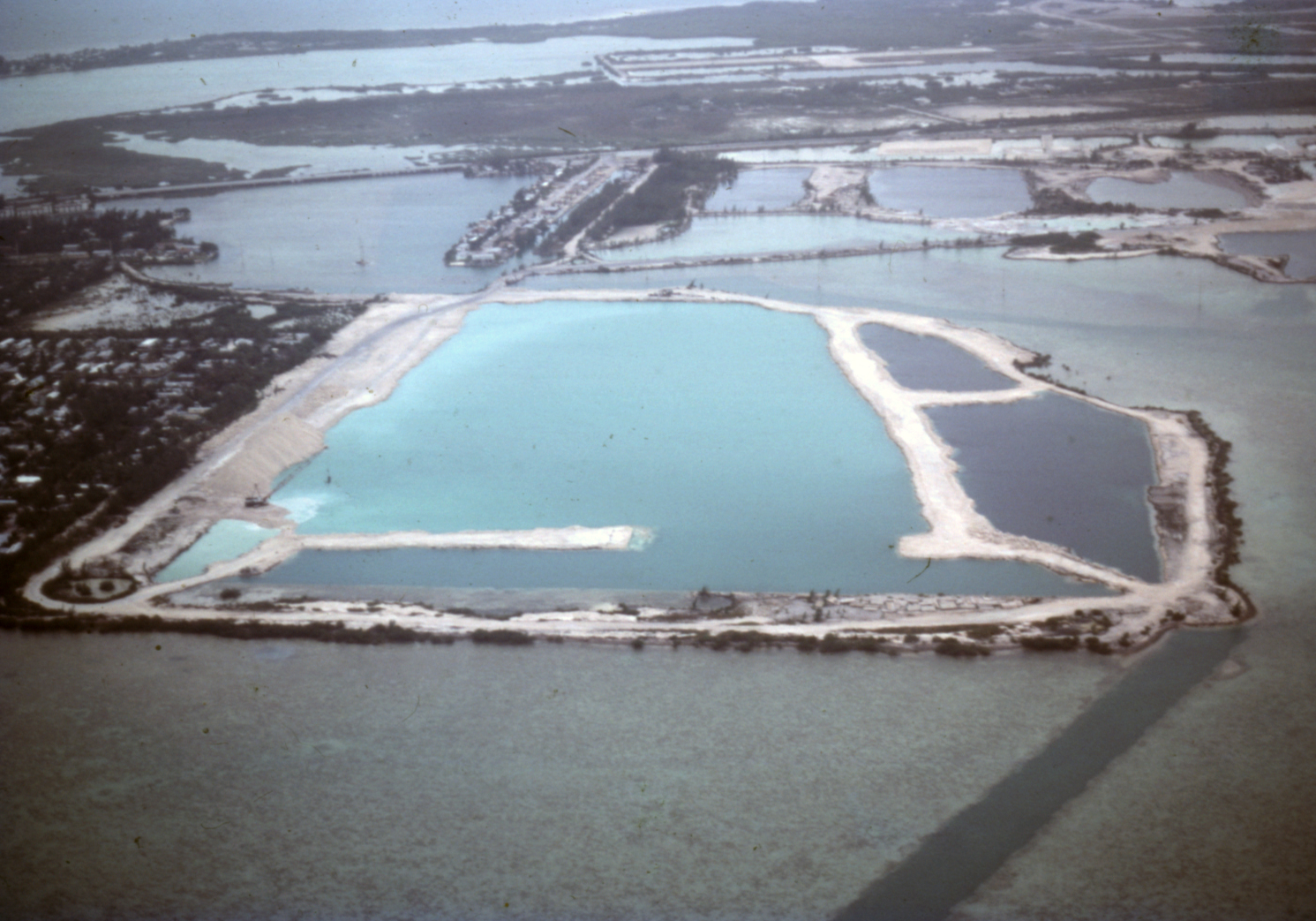
- Aerial view of Rockland Key, March 1988

- Rockland Key Rockland Key (the Caribbean)

Geography
- Location: Gulf of Mexico
- Coordinates: 24°35′31.99″N 81°41′01″W
- Archipelago: Florida Keys
- Adjacent to: Florida Straits

Administration
- United States
- State: Florida
- County: Monroe

Rockland Key is an island in the lower Florida Keys about 4 miles (6.4 km) east of Key West.

U.S. 1 (the Overseas Highway) crosses the edge of the key at approximately mile markers 8–9.5, between Boca Chica Key and Big Coppitt Key.

It is located directly across the Overseas Highway from East Rockland Key.
