= Rubicon Keys =

Two small islands north of the upper Florida Keys in Biscayne National Park

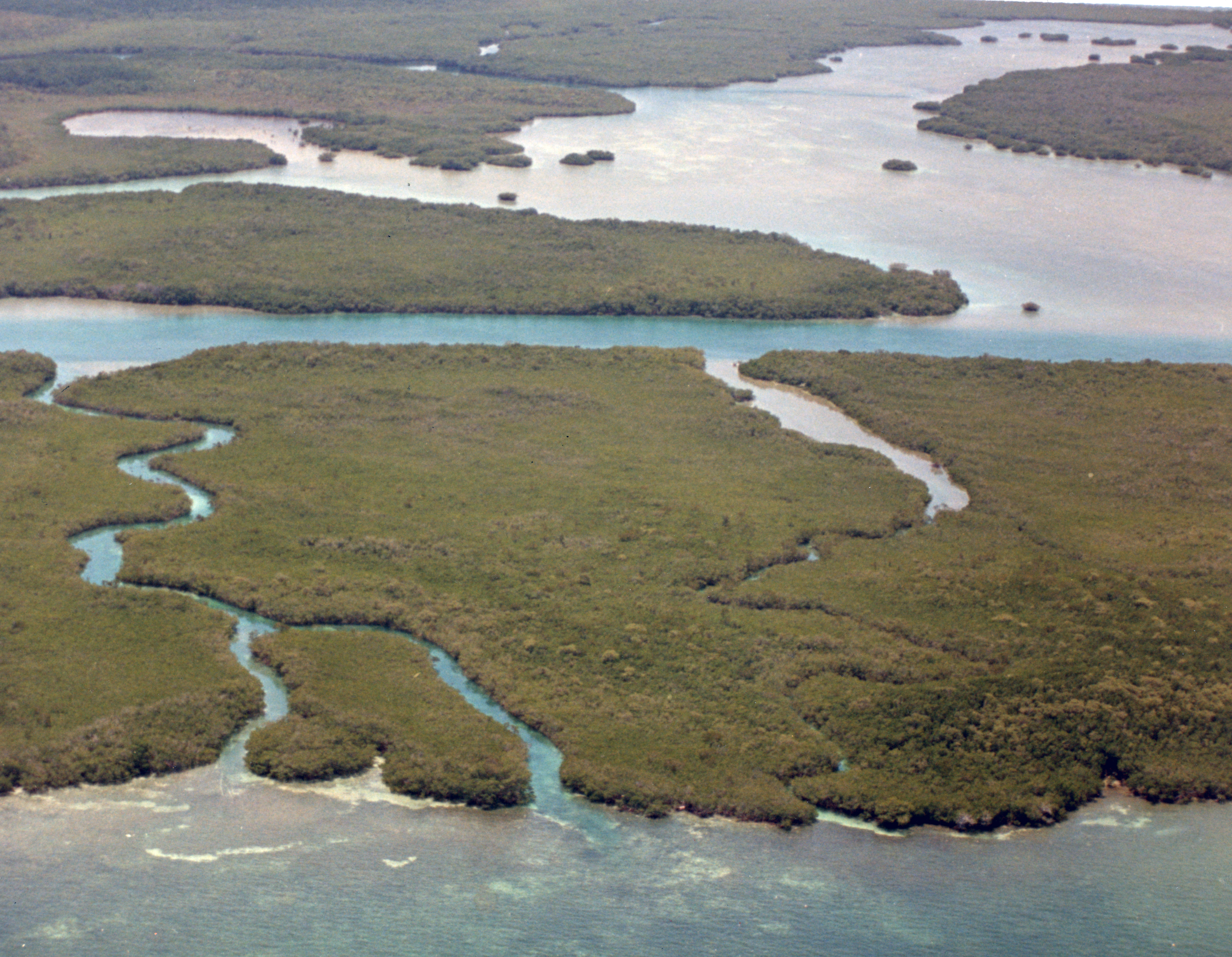
- Aerial view of Rubicon Keys, October 1987

- Rubicon Keys Rubicon Keys (North Atlantic)

Geography
- Location: Atlantic Ocean
- Coordinates: 25.395536°N 80.244607°W

Administration
- United States
- State: Florida
- County: Miami-Dade

The Rubicon Keys are two small islands north of the upper Florida Keys in Biscayne National Park. They are in Miami-Dade County, Florida.

They are located in southern Biscayne Bay, just north of Old Rhodes Key and Totten Key, and just east of the southern tip of Elliott Key. They are on the south side of Caesar Creek, the creek that separates Elliott and Old Rhodes Keys.

== History ==
These keys were named by early U.S. Coast & Geodetic Survey crews after the story of Julius Caesar crossing the Rubicon River in Italy.

The Bache Coast Survey of 1861 so names these keys. So named on U.S. Coast & Geodetic Survey chart #1249 (1937).
