= Knockemdown Key =

Island in the lower Florida Keys, United States

- Knockemdown Key Knockemdown Key (the Caribbean)

Geography
- Location: Gulf of Mexico
- Coordinates: 24.698°N 81.475°W

Administration
- United States
- State: Florida
- County: Monroe

Knockemdown Key is an island in the lower Florida Keys approximately 20 miles (32 km) east of Key West. It is northwest of Summerland Key, between Cudjoe Key and Big Torch Key.

A tidal station managed by NOAA is located on the island.

Access to the island is by boat only, with the closest public ramp located at the north end of Blimp Road on Cudjoe Key.

== Geography ==
Knockemdown Key is located at 24° 42.9’ N and 81° 28.7’ W, north of Summerland Key and northeast of Cudjoe Key. It has a land area of about 688 acres (278 hectares).

The island has significant mangrove growth and is populated by Key deer.

== Attractions, Events, Recreation and Culture ==
The island is considered one of the finest locations in the Florida Keys for sea kayaking.
