= Rodriguez Key =

Island in the upper Florida Keys, United States

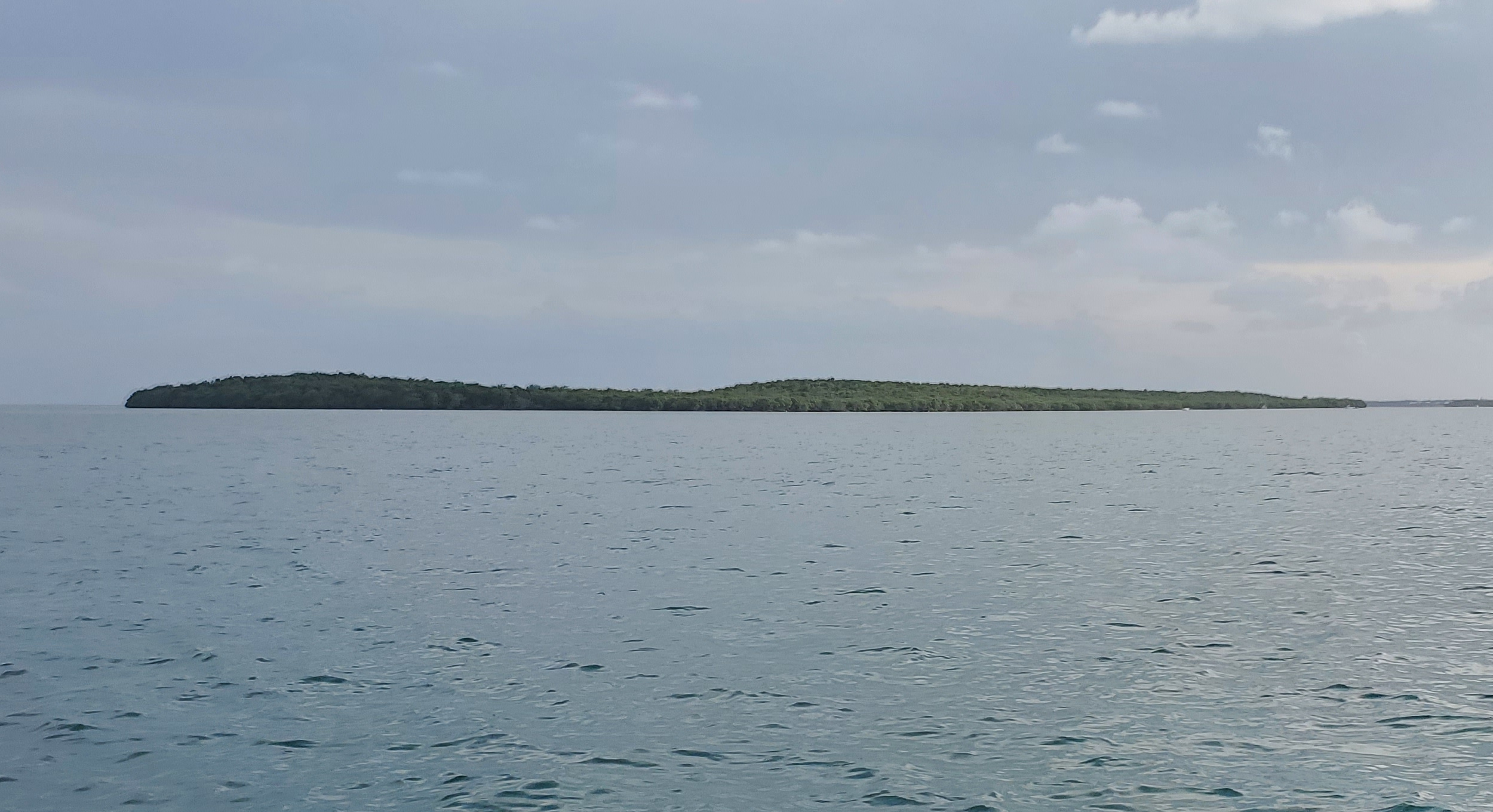
- Rodriguez Key viewed from the northeast

- Rodriguez Key Rodriguez Key (the Caribbean)

Geography
- Location: Atlantic Ocean
- Coordinates: 25°03′04″N 80°27′14″W
- Length: 1.52 km (0.944 mi)

Administration
- United States
- State: Florida
- County: Monroe

Demographics
- Population: 0

Rodriguez Key is an uninhabited island in Monroe County, Florida, in the upper Florida Keys. It is located east of Key Largo.

The island is covered by mangrove forests, including the species Rhizophora mangle, Avicennia nitida, and Laguncularia racemosa.

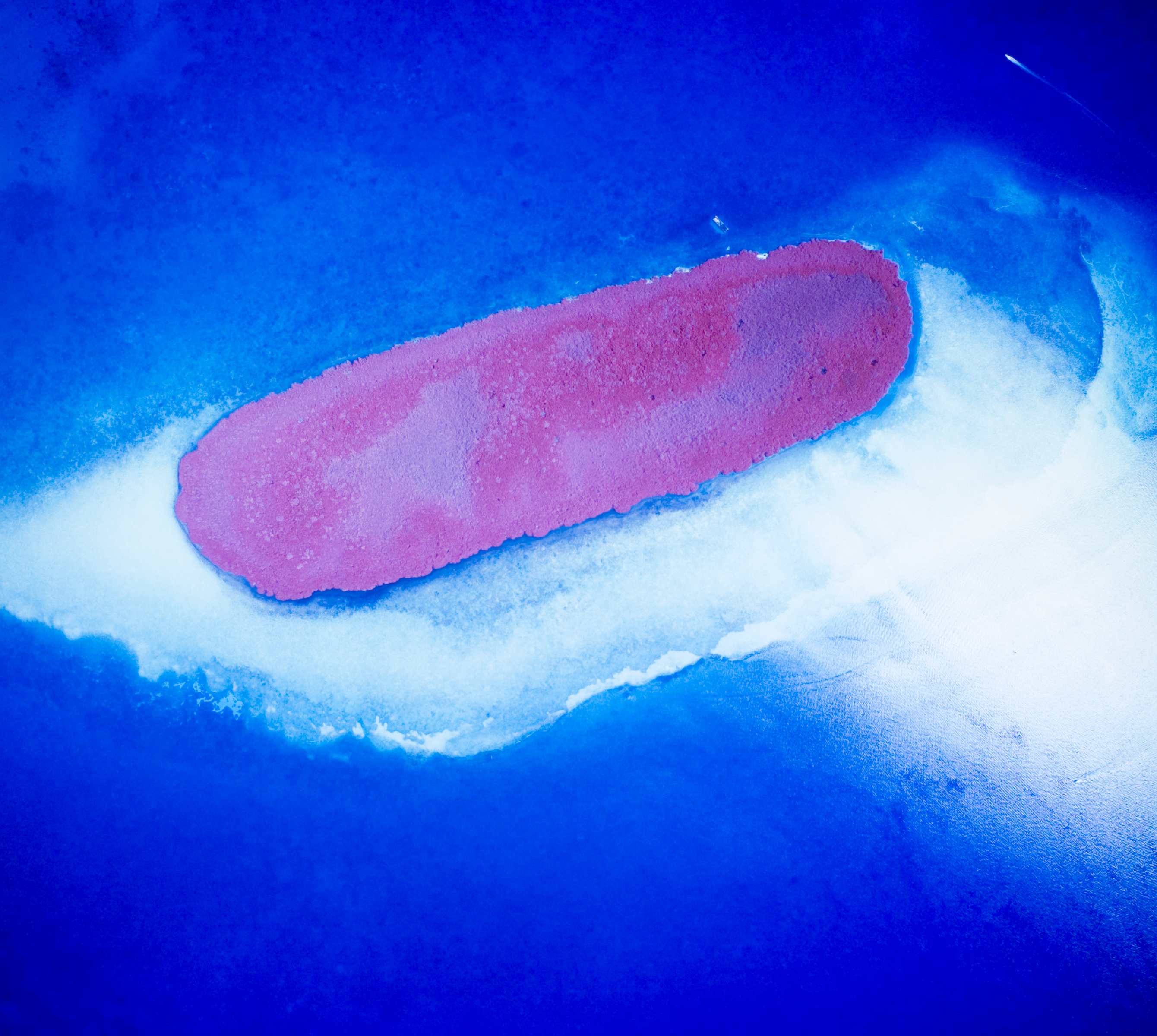
Color infrared image of Rodriguez Key in 1987
