= Fleming Key =

Island in the Florida Keys

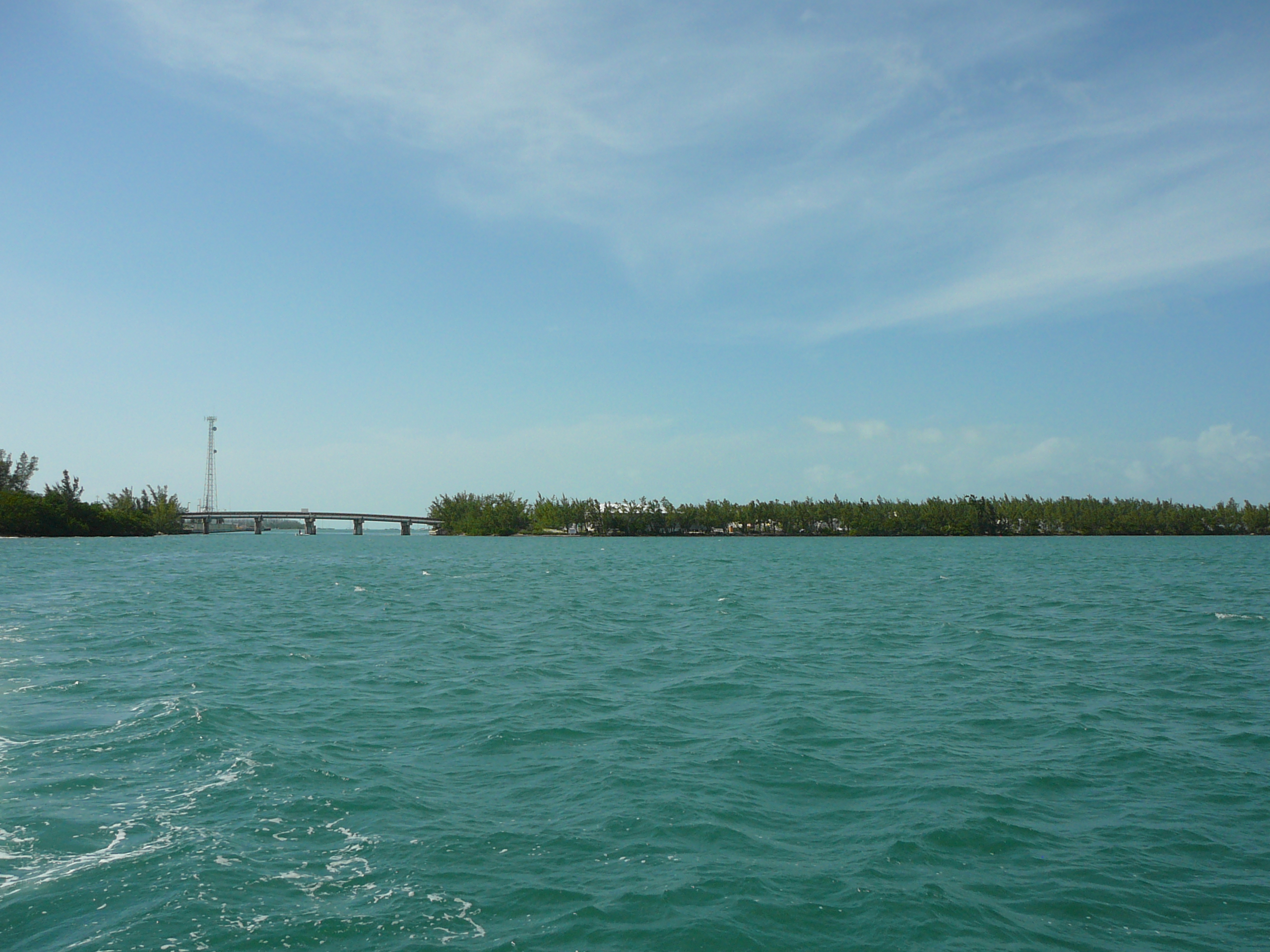
- The southern portion of Fleming Key as seen from the east, showing connecting bridge

- Fleming Key Fleming Key (the Caribbean)

Geography
- Location: Gulf of Mexico
- Coordinates: 24.57991°N 81.796045°W
- Archipelago: Florida Keys
- Adjacent to: Florida Straits

Administration
- United States
- State: Florida
- County: Monroe

Fleming Key is an island off the northwest corner of the island of Key West, Florida in the lower Florida Keys. It is roughly 2 miles (3.2 km) long by 0.25 miles (400 m) wide.

It is connected to the island of Key West by the Fleming Key Bridge (Mustin Road), having 18 feet (5.5 m) of clearance over Fleming Key Cut, a small channel.

The island and bridge road are part of a section of the Naval Air Station Key West called Trumbo Point Annex and are inaccessible to non-DoD or non-USCG affiliated civilians without U.S. Navy clearance. The island has a 10-million-US-gallon-per-day (38,000-cubic-metre-per-day) wastewater treatment plant. It also includes a dolphin research center, marine corrosion testing facility and bunkers where the Navy stores weapons and ammunition.

The bunkers have "explosive safety arcs," or areas that could be blast zones in the case of an accident. Sailing and especially anchoring within those areas is prohibited.

The United States Army Special Forces Underwater Operations Training Center is located at the far northern tip of Fleming Key.

Marine Forces Special Operations Command conducts their amphibious phase of the Initial Training Course on Fleming Key.

== Gallery ==
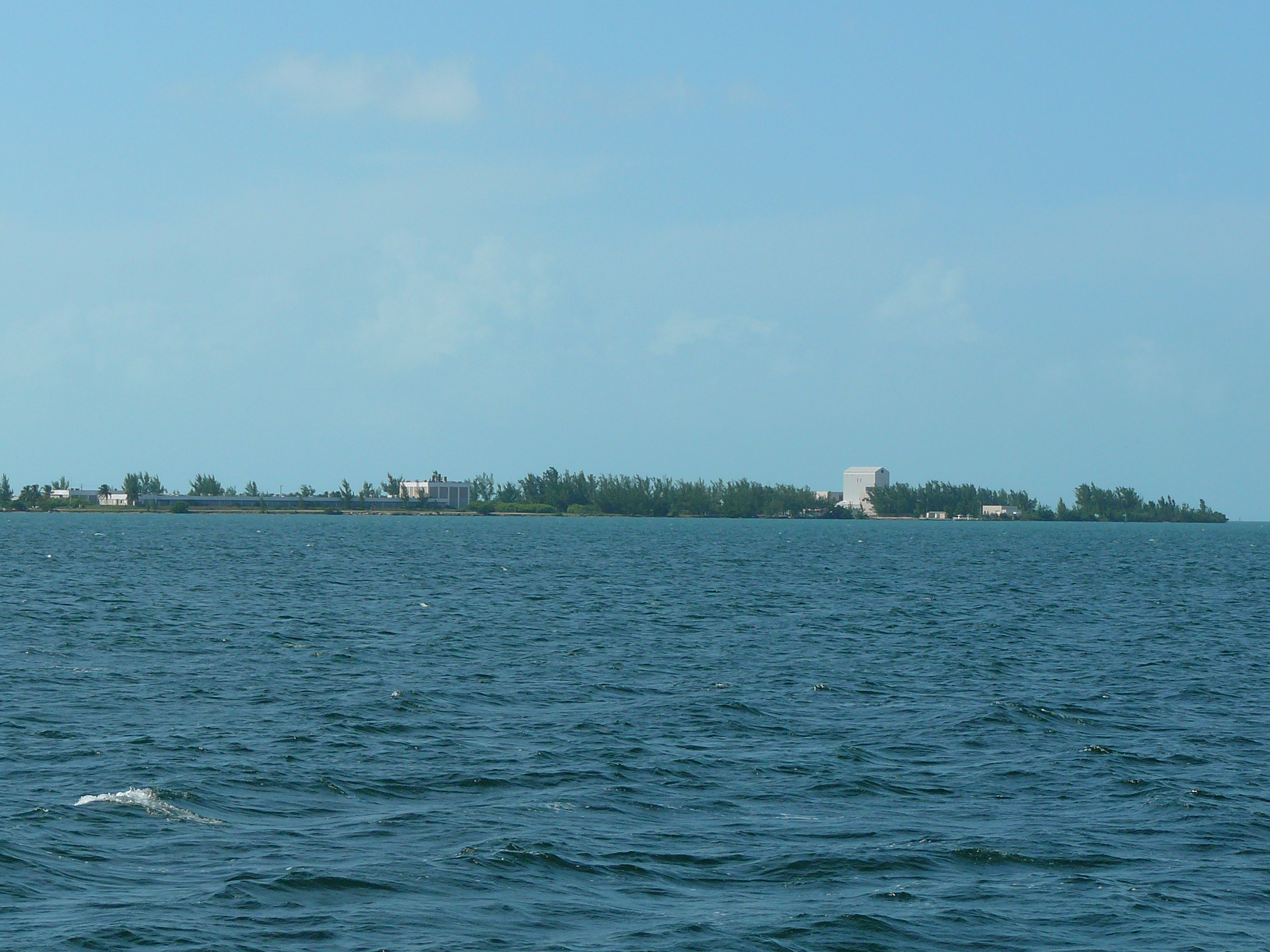
The northern portion of Fleming Key as seen from the east, showing several NAS structures

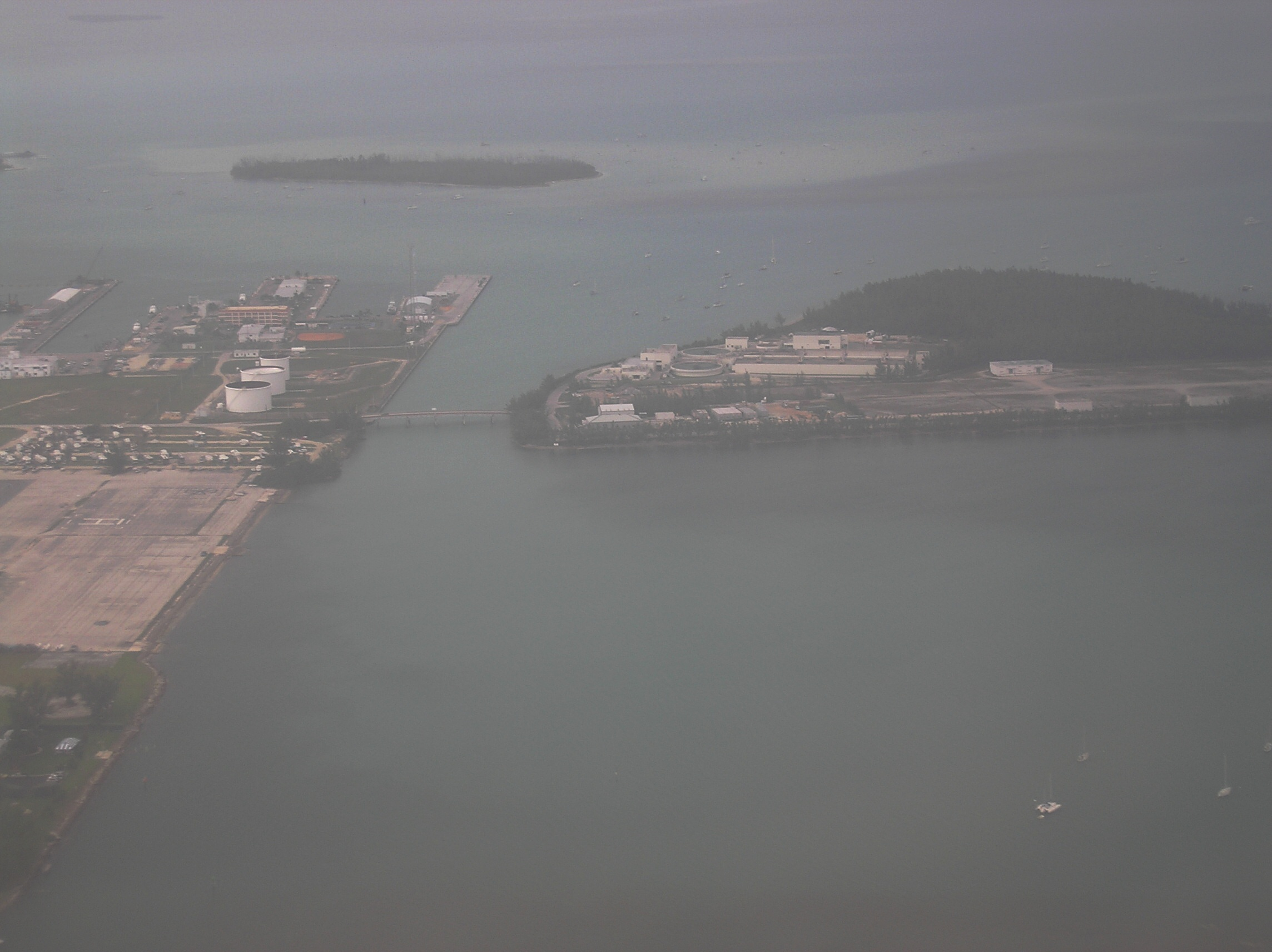
Aerial view of south side of Fleming Key and bridge

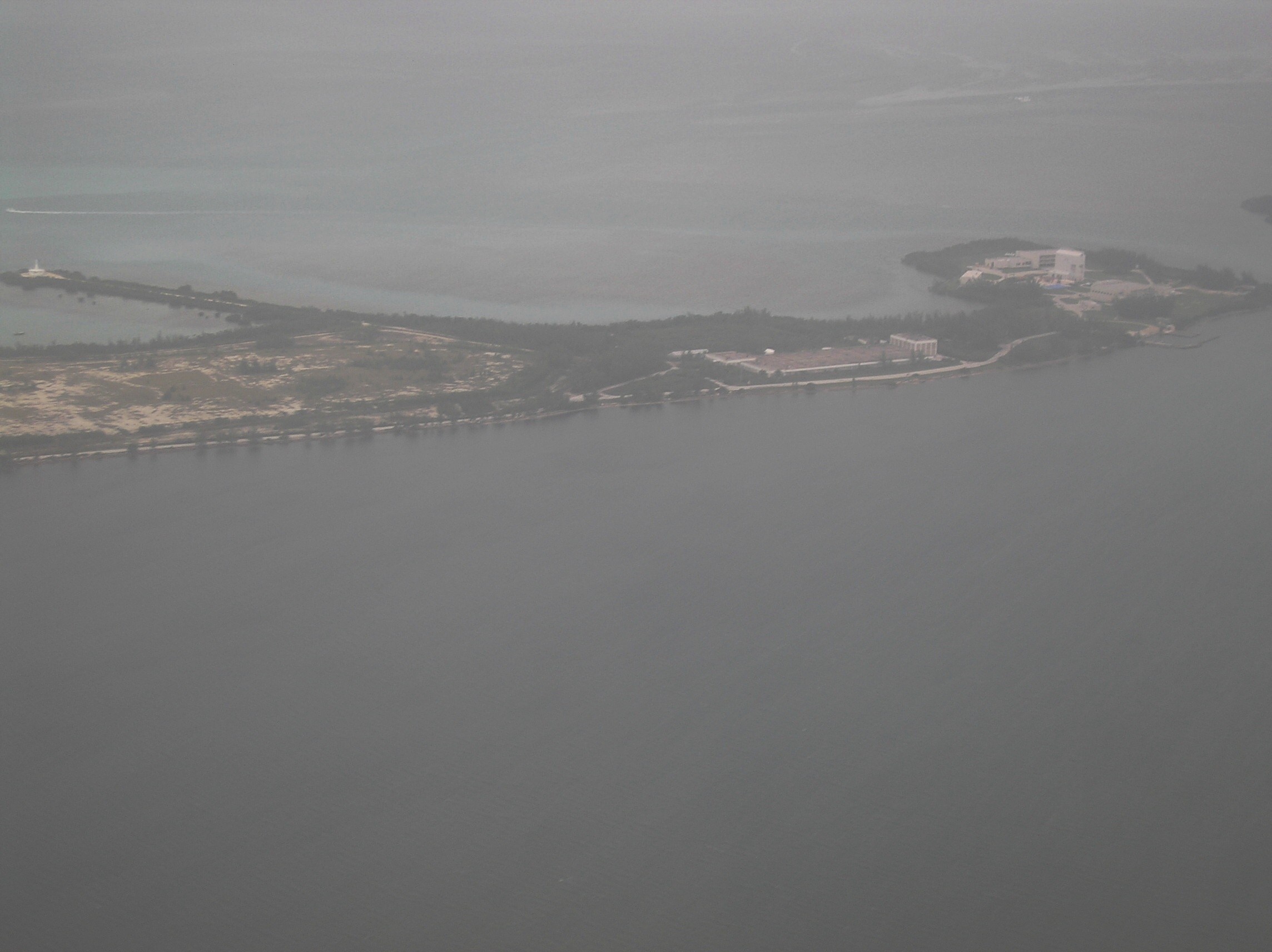
Aerial view of north side of Fleming Key
