= East Rockland Key =

Island in the lower Florida Keys, United States

- East Rockland Key East Rockland Key (the Caribbean)

Geography
- Location: Gulf of Mexico
- Coordinates: 24.591°N 81.676°W
- Archipelago: Florida Keys
- Adjacent to: Florida Straits

Administration
- United States
- State: Florida
- County: Monroe

East Rockland Key is an island in the lower Florida Keys about 4 miles (6.4 km) east of Key West.

U.S. 1 (or the Overseas Highway) crosses the edge of the key at approximately mile markers 8–9.5, between Boca Chica Key and Big Coppitt Key.

It is located directly across the Overseas Highway from Rockland Key.

== Flora and fauna ==
There is endangered population of marsh rabbits (Sylvilagus palustris hefneri) on island.
