= Florida Keys =

Coral cay archipelago in Florida, United States

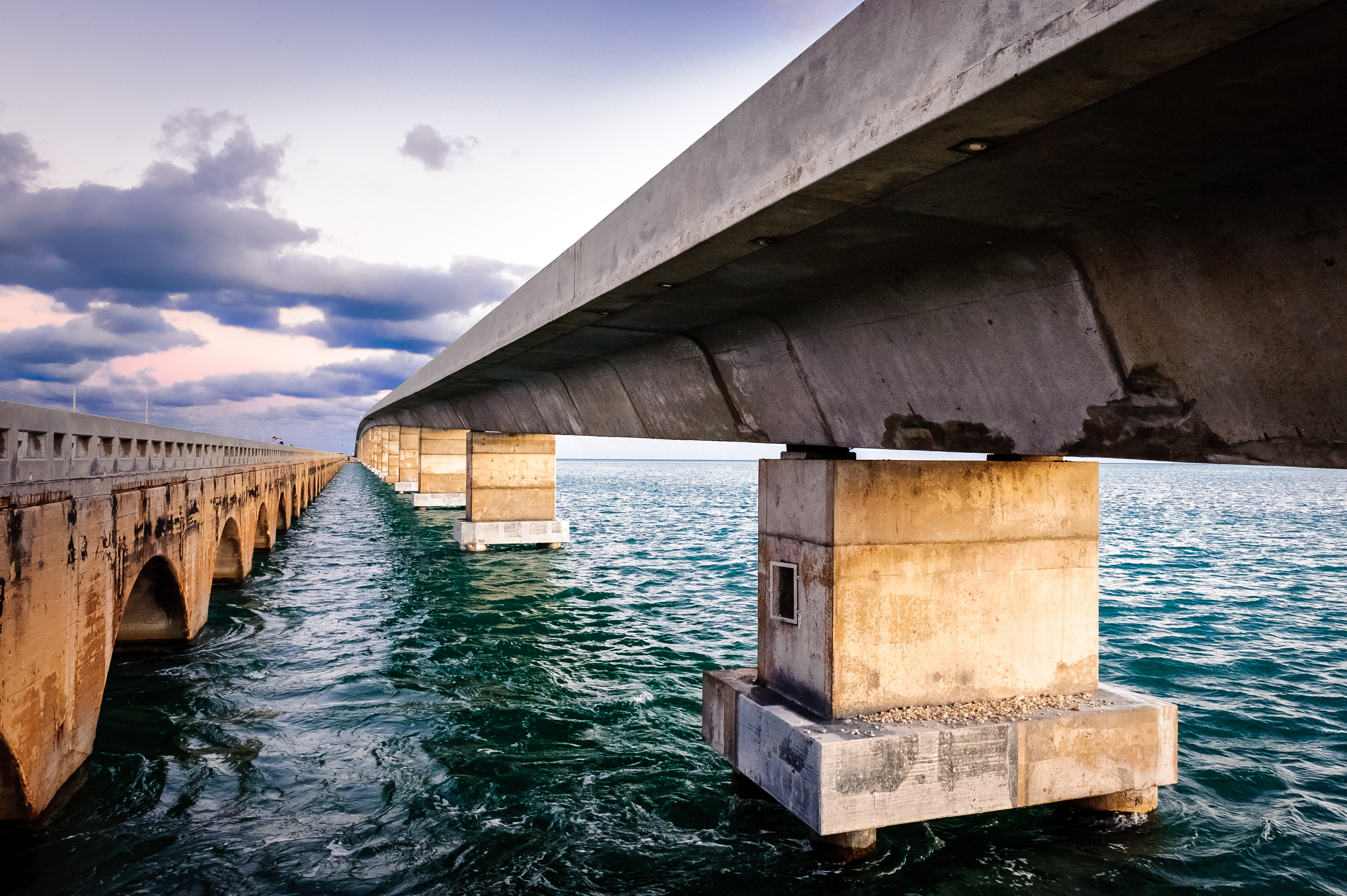
- Overseas Highway and Railway Bridges in the Florida Keys

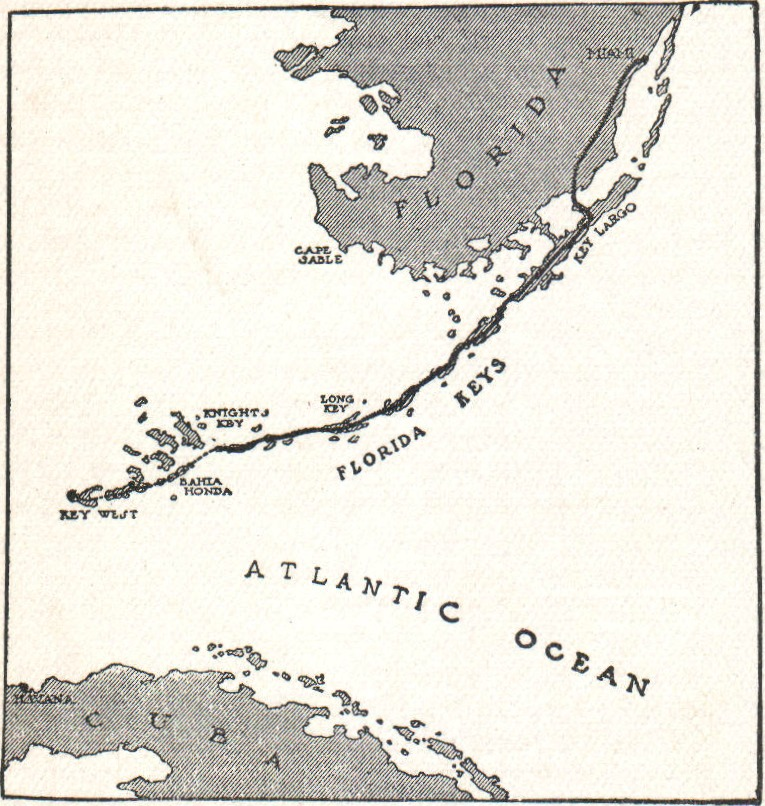

Geography
- Location: Florida Straits
- Coordinates: 24°40′01″N 81°32′39″W
- Area: 356 km^{2} (137 sq mi)

Administration
- United States
- State: Florida

Demographics
- Population: 82,874 (2020)

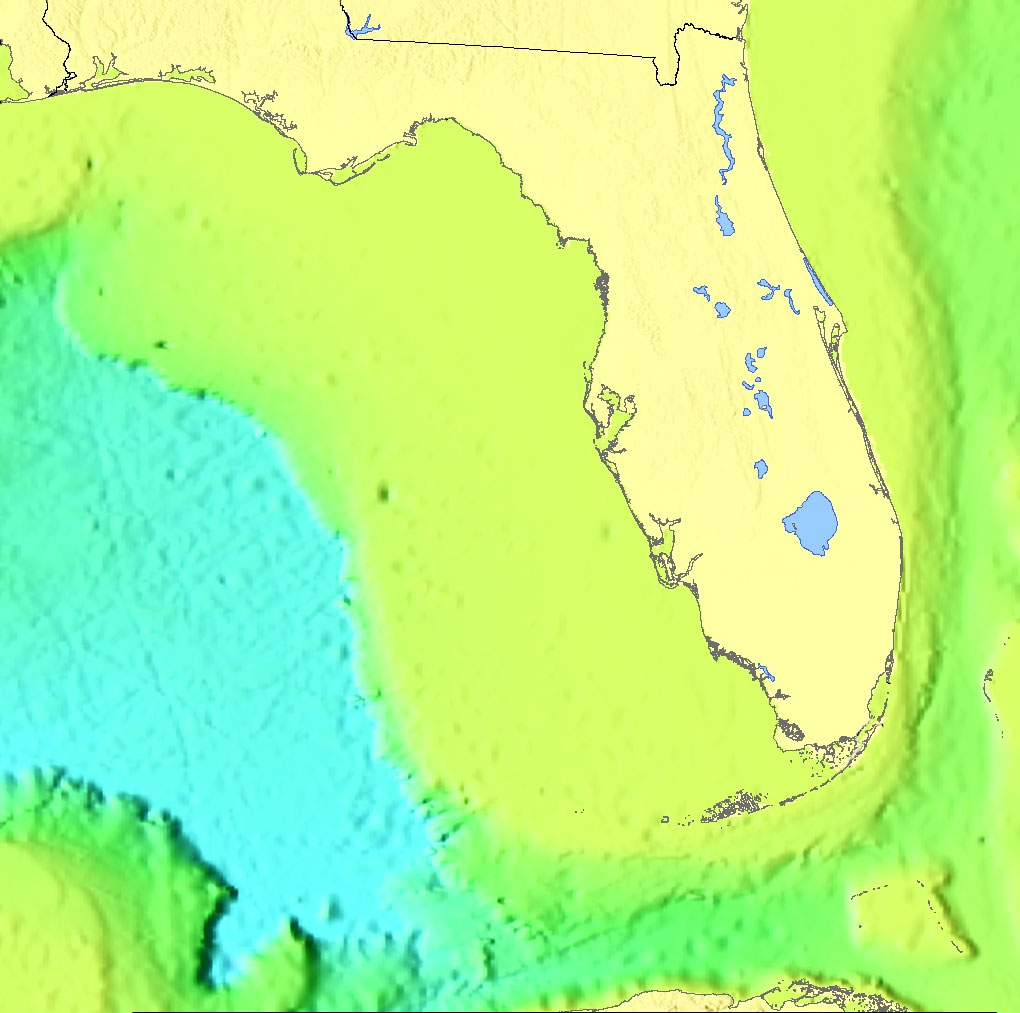
The Keys were formed near the edge of the Florida Platform.

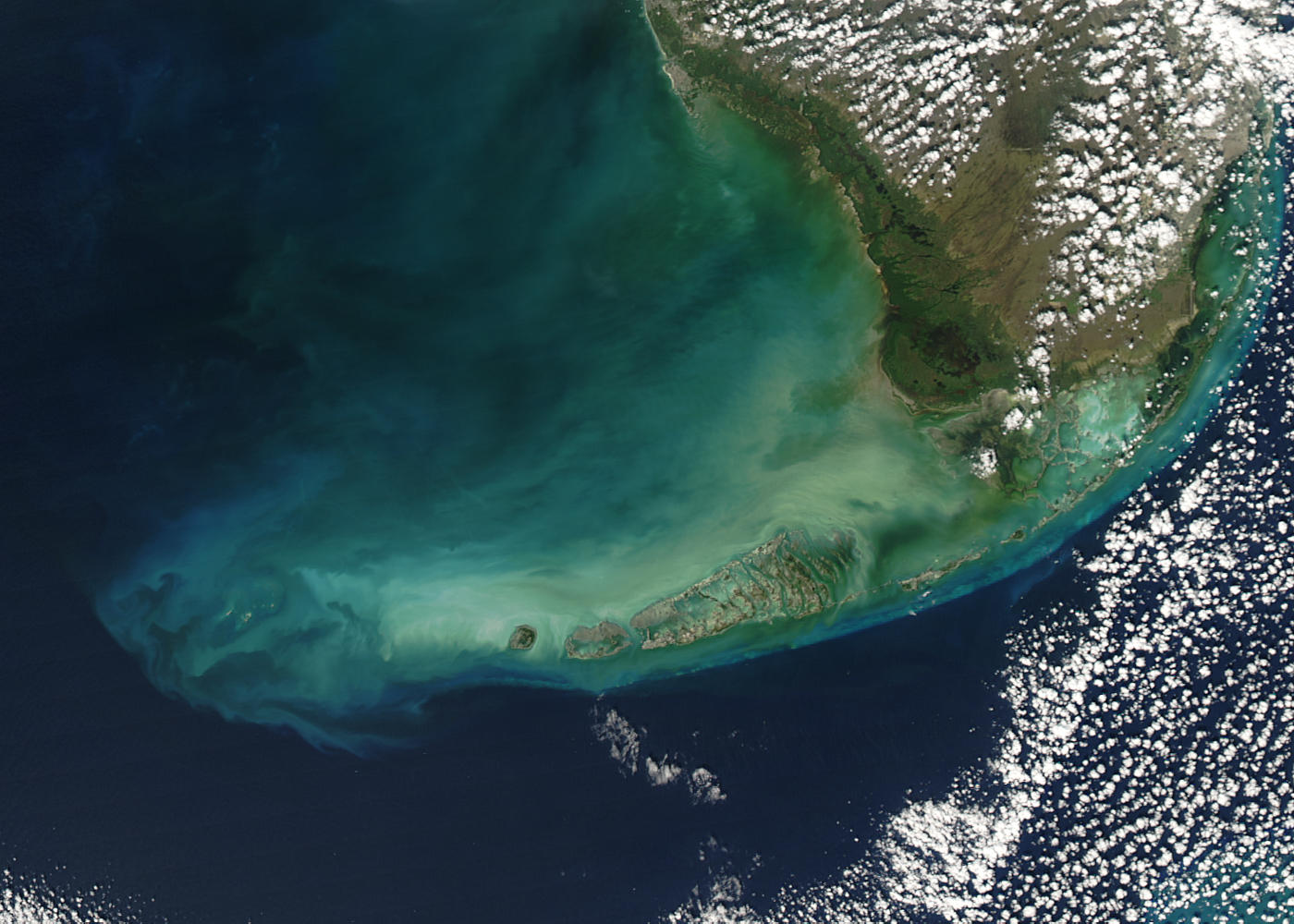
Satellite image of the Florida Keys, December 2003

The Florida Keys are a coral cay archipelago off the southern coast of Florida, forming the southernmost part of the continental United States. They begin at the southeastern coast of the Florida peninsula, about 15 miles (24 km) south of Miami and extend in an arc south-southwest and then westward to Key West, the westernmost of the inhabited islands, and on to the uninhabited Dry Tortugas. The islands lie along the Florida Straits, dividing the Atlantic Ocean to the east from the Gulf of Mexico to the northwest, and defining one edge of Florida Bay. The southern part of Key West is 93 miles (150 km) from Cuba. The Keys are located between about 24.3 and 25.5 degrees north latitude.

More than 95% of the land area lies in Monroe County, but a small portion extends northeast into Miami-Dade County, such as Totten Key. The total land area is 137.3 square miles (356 km^{2}). At the 2010 census the population was 73,090, with an average density of 532.34 per square mile (205.54/km^{2}), although much of the population is concentrated in a few areas of much higher density, such as the city of Key West, which has 32% of the Keys' total population. The 2014 Census population estimate was 77,136. The 2020 Census population estimate was 82,874.

The city of Key West is the county seat of Monroe County. The county consists of a section on the mainland which is almost entirely in Everglades National Park, and the Keys islands from Key Largo to Dry Tortugas National Park.

== History ==
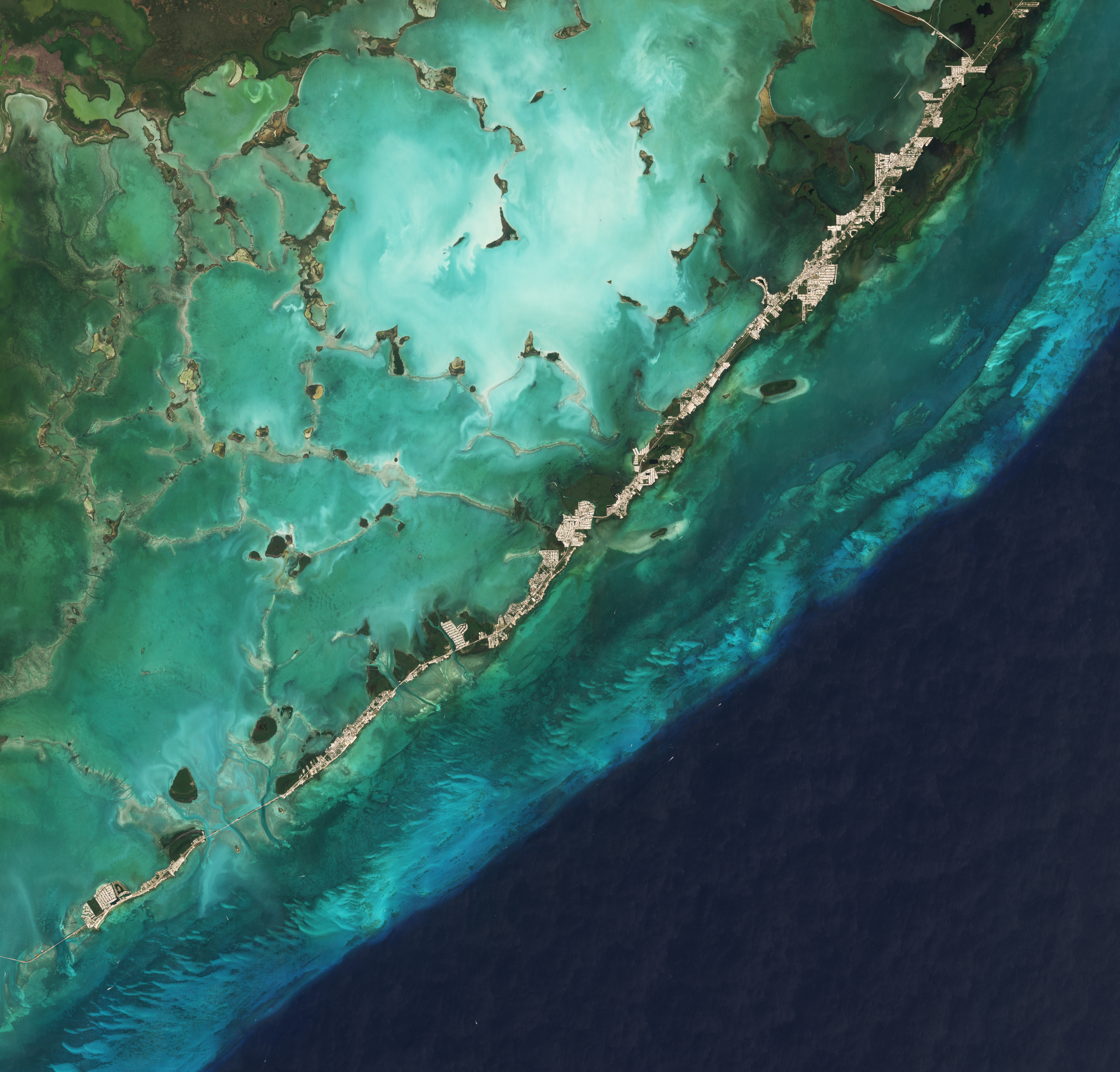
Lower Matecumbe Key to Key Largo, captured by the Sentinel-2 satellite

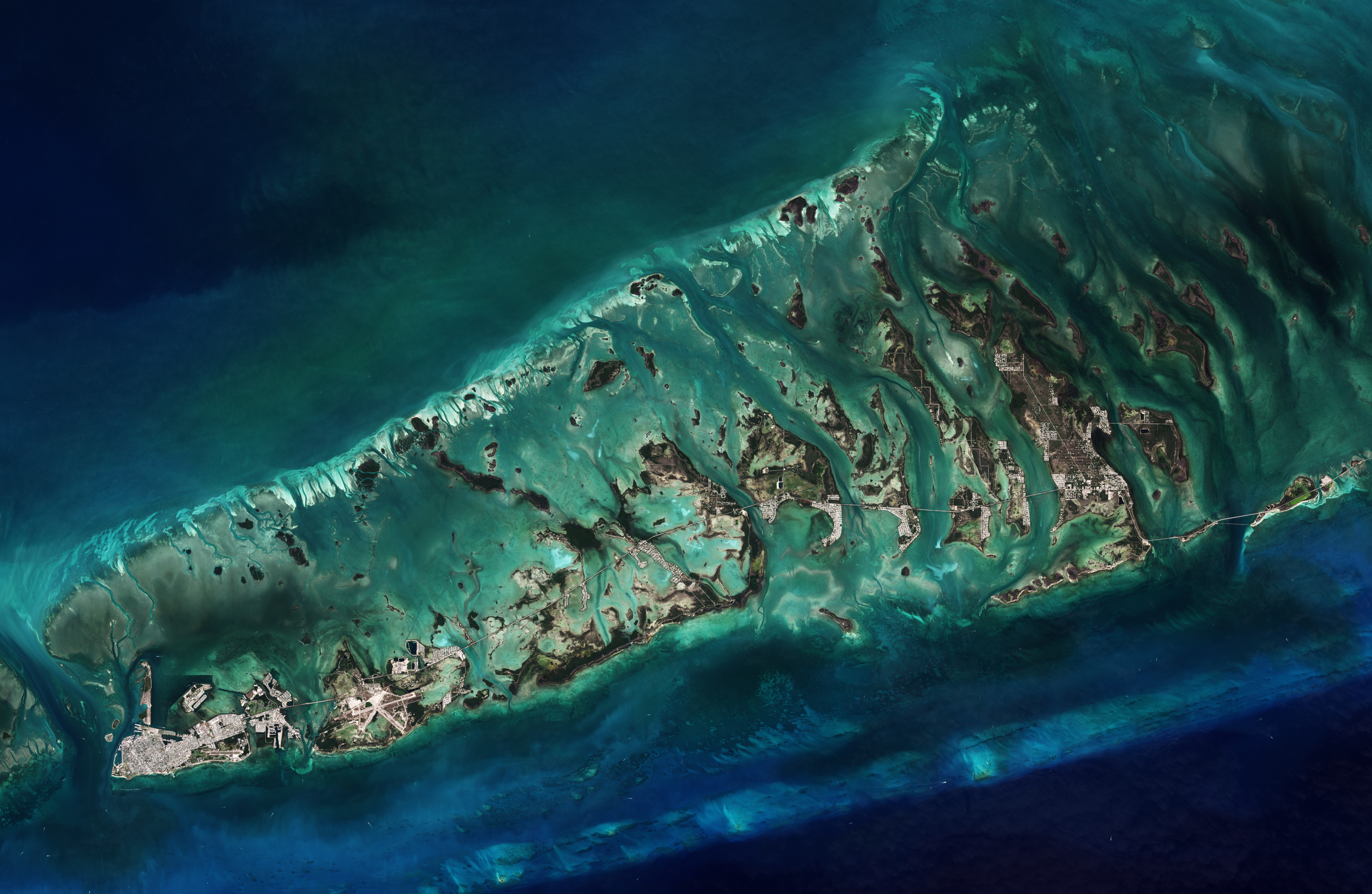
Key West to Big Pine Key, seen from Sentinel-2 satellite

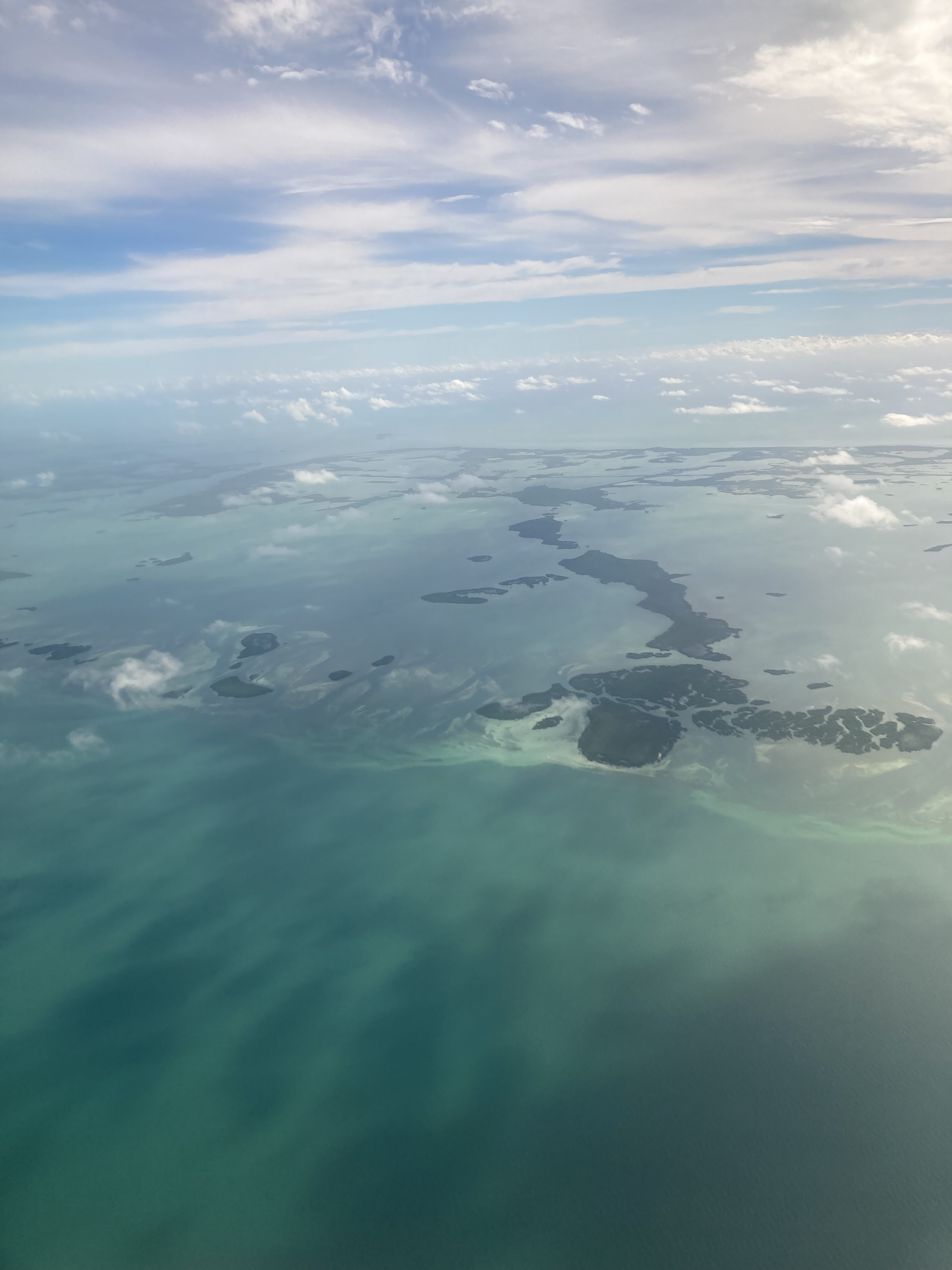
Aerial view of the Florida Keys just north of Key West

The Keys were originally inhabited by the Calusa and Tequesta people and were later charted by Juan Ponce de León in 1513. De León named the islands Los Martires ("The Martyrs"), as they looked like suffering men from a distance. "Key" is derived from the Spanish word cayo, meaning small island. For many years, Key West was the largest town in Florida, and it grew prosperous on wrecking revenues. The isolated outpost was well located for trade with Cuba and the Bahamas and was on the main trade route from New Orleans. Improved navigation led to fewer shipwrecks, and Key West went into a decline in the late nineteenth century.

=== Overseas Railway ===
The Keys were long accessible only by water. This changed with the completion of Henry Flagler's Overseas Railway in the early 1910s. Flagler, a major developer of Florida's Atlantic coast, extended his Florida East Coast Railway down to Key West with an ambitious series of oversea railroad trestles. Three hurricanes disrupted the project in 1906, 1909, and 1910.

=== 1935 Labor Day hurricane ===
The strongest hurricane to strike the U.S. made landfall near Islamorada in the Upper Keys on Labor Day, Monday, September 2, 1935. Winds were estimated to have gusted to 200 mph (320 km/h), raising a storm surge more than 17.5 feet (5.3 m) above sea level that washed over the islands. More than 400 people were killed, though some estimates place the number of deaths at more than 600.

The Labor Day hurricane was one of only four hurricanes to make landfall at Category 5 strength on the U.S. coast since reliable weather records began (about 1850). The other storms were Hurricane Camille (1969), Hurricane Andrew (1992), and Hurricane Michael (2018).

In 1935, new bridges were under construction to connect a highway through the entire Keys. Hundreds of World War I veterans working on the roadway as part of a government relief program were housed in non-reinforced buildings in three construction camps in the Upper Keys. When the evacuation train failed to reach the camps before the storm, more than 200 veterans perished. Their deaths caused anger and charges of mismanagement that led to a Congressional investigation.

The storm also ended the 23-year run of the Overseas Railway; the damaged tracks were never rebuilt, and the Overseas Highway (U.S. Highway 1) replaced the railroad as the main transportation route from Miami to Key West.

=== Seven Mile Bridge ===
One of the longest bridges when it was built, the Seven Mile Bridge connects Knight's Key (part of the city of Marathon in the Middle Keys) to Little Duck Key in the Lower Keys. The piling-supported concrete bridge is 35,862 ft (10,931 m) or 6.79 miles (10.93 km) long. The current bridge bypasses Pigeon Key, a small island that housed workers building Henry Flagler's Florida East Coast Railway in the 1900s, which the original Seven Mile Bridge crossed. A 2.2-mile (3.5 km) section of the old bridge remains for access to the island, although it was closed to vehicular traffic on March 4, 2008. The aging structure has been deemed unsafe by the Florida Department of Transportation. Costly repairs, estimated to be as much as $34 million, were expected to begin in July 2008. Monroe County was unable to secure a $17 million loan through the state infrastructure bank, delaying work for at least a year. On June 14, 2008, the old bridge section leading to Pigeon Key was closed to fishing as well. While still open to pedestrians—walking, biking, and jogging—if the bridge were closed altogether, only a ferry subsidized by FDOT and managed by the county would transport visitors to the island.

=== Overseas Highway ===
After the destruction of the Keys railway by the Labor Day Hurricane of 1935, the railroad bridges, including the Seven Mile Bridge, were converted to automobile roadways. This roadway, U.S. Highway 1, became the Overseas Highway that runs from Key Largo south to Key West. Today this highway allows travel through the tropical islands of the Florida Keys, and the viewing of exotic plants and animals found nowhere else on the US mainland, as well as the largest coral reef chain in the United States.

=== Cuban exiles ===
Following the Cuban Revolution, many Cubans emigrated to South Florida. Key West traditionally had strong links with its neighbor ninety miles south by water, and large numbers of Cubans settled there. The Keys still attract Cubans leaving their home country, and stories of "rafters" coming ashore are not uncommon.

=== Conch Republic ===
In 1982, the United States Border Patrol established a roadblock and inspection points on US Highway 1, stopping all northbound traffic returning to the mainland at Florida City, to search vehicles for illegal drugs and undocumented immigrants. The Key West City Council repeatedly complained about the roadblocks, which were a major inconvenience for travellers, and hurt the Keys' important tourism industry.

After various unsuccessful complaints and attempts to get a legal injunction against the blockade failed in federal court in Miami, on April 23, 1982, Key West mayor Dennis Wardlow and the city council declared the independence of the city of Key West, calling it the "Conch Republic", and declared war on the United States by striking an officer of the Key West Naval Air Station (NAS) on the head with a loaf of stale Cuban bread. After one minute of secession, he (as "Prime Minister") surrendered to the officer and requested US$1,000,000,000 in "foreign aid".

The stunt succeeded in generating great publicity for the Keys' plight, and the inspection station roadblock was removed. The idea of the Conch Republic has provided a new source of revenue for the Keys by way of tourist keepsake sales, and the Conch Republic has participated in later protests.

== Geology ==
The northern and central sections of the Florida Keys are the exposed portions of an ancient coral reef, the Key Largo Limestone. The northernmost island arising from the ancient reef formation is Elliott Key, in Biscayne National Park. North of Elliott Key are several small transitional keys, composed of sand built up around small areas of exposed ancient reef. Further north, Key Biscayne and places north are barrier islands, built up of sand. The islands in the southwestern part of the chain, from Big Pine Key to the Marquesas Keys, are exposed areas of Miami Limestone.

The Florida Keys have taken their present form as the result of the drastic changes in sea level associated with recent glaciations or ice ages. Beginning some 130,000 years ago, the Sangamonian Stage raised sea levels about 25 feet (7.6 m) above the current level. All of southern Florida was covered by a shallow sea. Several parallel lines of reef formed along the edge of the submerged Florida Platform, stretching south and then west from the present Miami area to what is now the Dry Tortugas. This reef formed the Key Largo Limestone that is exposed on the surface from Soldier Key (midway between Key Biscayne and Elliott Key) to the southeast portion of Big Pine Key and the Newfound Harbor Keys. The types of coral that formed Key Largo Limestone can be identified on the exposed surface of these keys. Minor fluctuations in sea level exposed parts of the reef, subjecting it to erosion. Acidic water, which can result from decaying vegetation, dissolves limestone. Some of the dissolved limestone redeposited as a denser cap rock, which can be seen as outcrops overlying the Key Largo and Miami limestones throughout the Keys. The limestone that eroded from the reef formed oolites in the shallow sea behind the reef, and together with the skeletal remains of bryozoans, formed the Miami Limestone that is the current surface bedrock of the lower Florida peninsula and the lower keys from Big Pine Key to Key West. To the west of Key West, the ancient reef is covered by recent calcareous sand. While the islands of the upper and middle keys, consisting of Key Largo Limestone, form a long, narrow arc, the islands of the lower keys are perpendicular to the line of that arc. This configuration arose from an ancient tidal-bar system, in which tidal channels cut through a submerged oolitic deposit. The bars lithified into Miami Limestone, and with changes in sea level are presently exposed as the islands, while the channels between the bars now separate the islands.

Just offshore of the Florida Keys along the edge of the Florida Straits is the Florida Reef (also known as the Florida Reef Tract), separated from the keys by the Hawk Channel. The Florida Reef extends 170 miles (270 km) from Fowey Rocks just east of Soldier Key to just south of the Marquesas Keys. It is the third-largest barrier reef system in the world.

== Environment ==
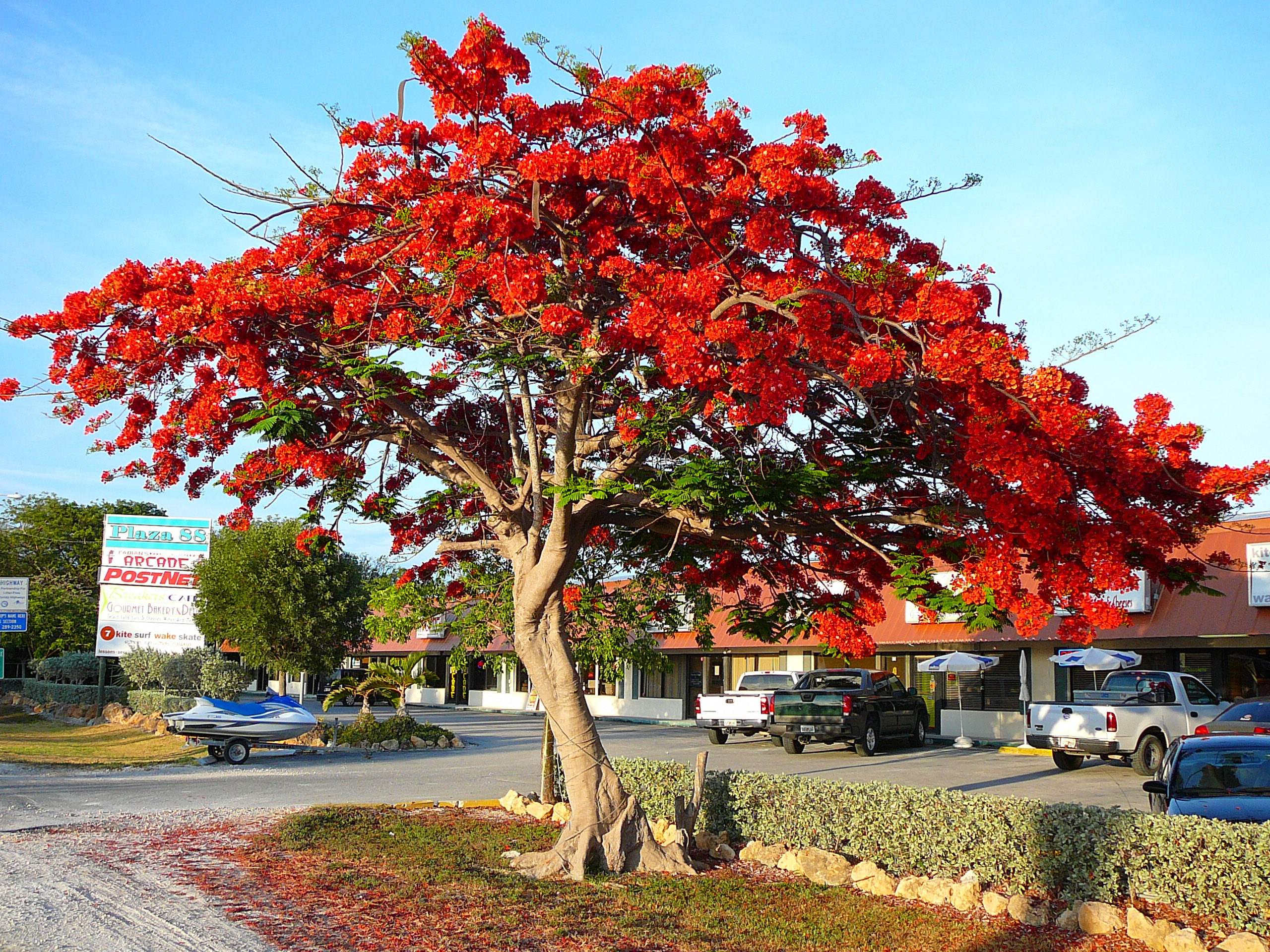
Royal Poinciana tree in full bloom in the Florida Keys

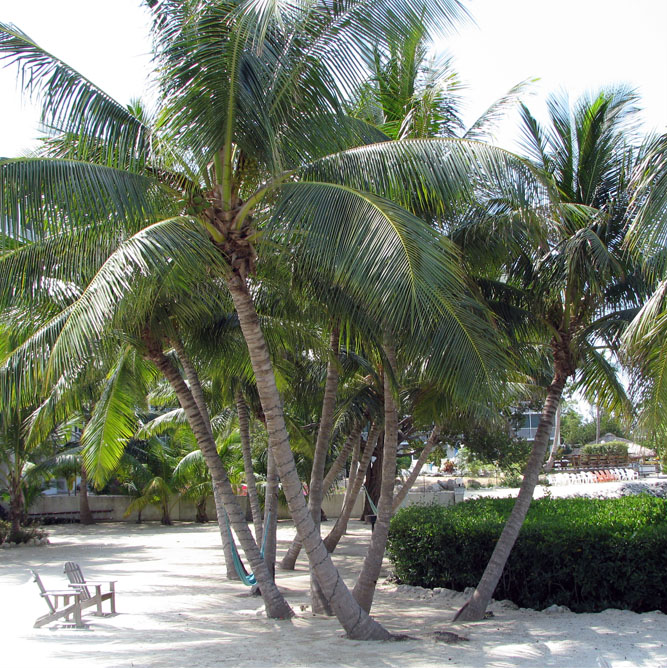
Coconut palm trees are grown all over South Florida.

Sunset near Marathon

The climate and environment of the Florida Keys are closer to that of the Caribbean than the rest of Florida, though unlike the Caribbean's volcanic islands, the Keys were built by plants and animals. The Upper Keys islands are composed of sandy-type accumulations of limestone grains produced by plants and marine organisms. The Lower Keys are the remnants of large coral reefs, which became fossilized and exposed when the sea level dropped.

The natural habitats of the Keys are upland forests, inland wetlands, and shoreline zones. Soil ranges from sand to marl to rich, decomposed leaf litter. In some places, "caprock" (the eroded surface of coral formations) covers the ground. Rain falling through leaf debris becomes acidic, dissolving holes in the limestone, where soil accumulates, and trees root.

=== Flora and fauna ===
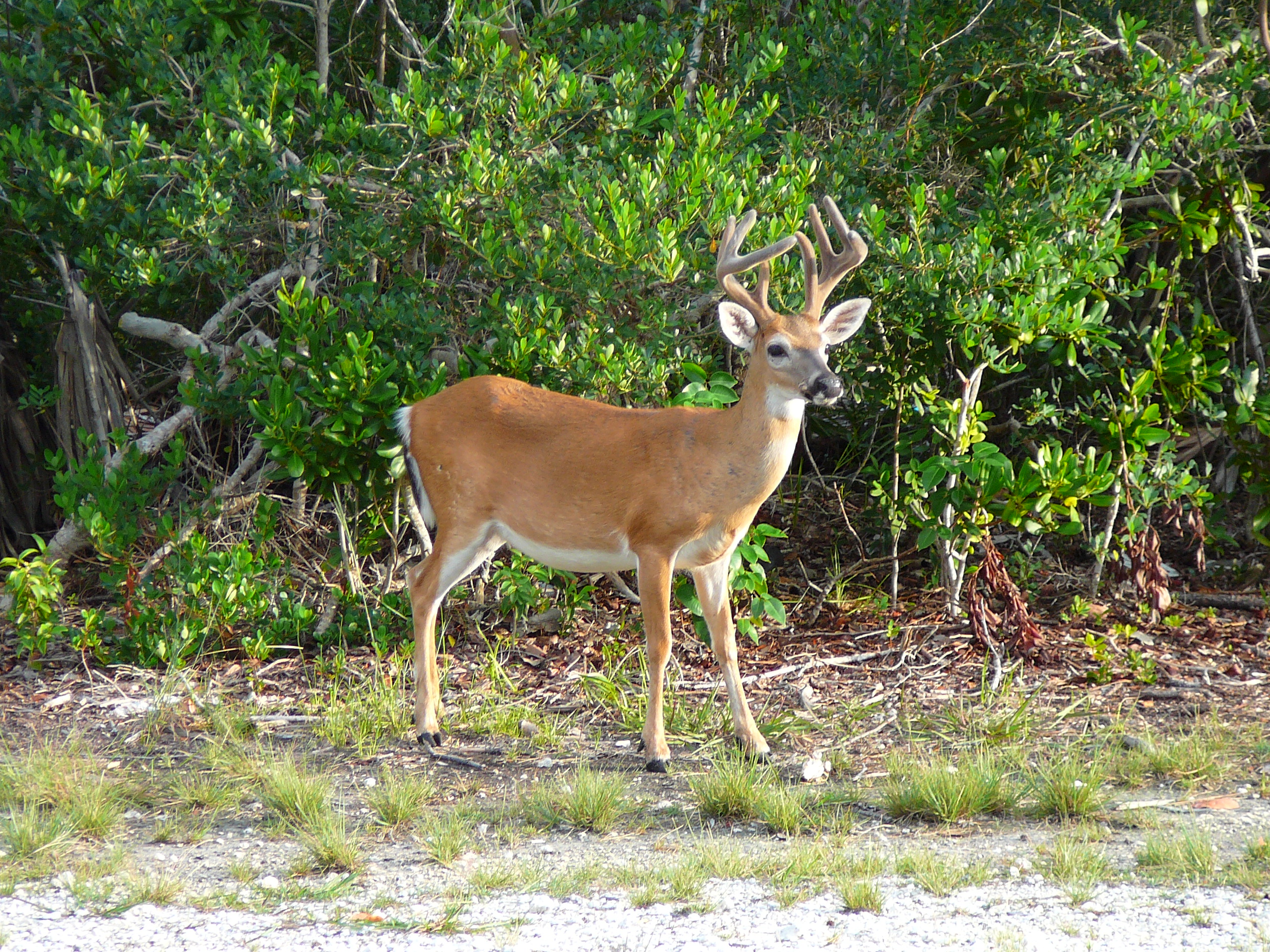
A male Key Deer on No Name Key in the lower Keys

The Florida Keys accommodate distinctive plant and animal species, some found nowhere else in the United States, as the Keys define the northern extent of their ranges. The climate also allows many imported plants to thrive. Some exotic species that arrived as landscape plants now invade and threaten natural areas.

The native flora of the Keys is diverse, including members of both temperate families, such as red maple (Acer rubrum), slash pine (Pinus elliottii var. densa) and oaks (Quercus spp.), growing at the southern end of their ranges, and tropical families, including mahogany (Swietenia mahagoni), gumbo limbo (Bursera simaruba), stoppers (Eugenia spp.), Jamaican dogwood (Piscidia piscipula), and many others, which grow only in tropical climates. Several types of palms are native to the Florida Keys, including the Florida thatch palm (Thrinax radiata), which grows to its greatest size in Florida on the islands of the Keys.

The Keys are also home to unique animal species, including the American crocodile, Key deer (protected by the National Key Deer Refuge), and the Key Largo woodrat. The Keys are part of the northernmost range of the American crocodile, which is found throughout the Neotropics. The Key Largo Woodrat is found only in the northern part of its namesake island and is a focus of management activities in Crocodile Lake National Wildlife Refuge. About 70 miles (110 km) west of Key West is Dry Tortugas National Park.

The waters surrounding the Keys are part of a protected area known as the Florida Keys National Marine Sanctuary.

== Climate ==
The climate of the Florida Keys is tropical savanna (Köppen climate classification: Aw). Other than some areas of coastal Miami (Miami Beach), the Florida Keys are the only areas in the continental United States to never report freezing temperatures since settlement. The record low in Key West is 41 °F (5 °C) (in both 1886 and 1981), and low temperatures below 48 °F (9 °C) are rare. Most of the Florida Keys fall into USDA zone 11a to 11b; Key West is zone 12a.

There are two main "seasons" in the Florida Keys, a hot and wet season from June through October, and a dry season from November through April, that features little rainfall, sunny skies, and warm breezy conditions. The warm and sunny winter climate, with average highs around 75 °F (24 °C) and lows above 60 °F (16 °C), is the main tourist season in the Florida Keys. Key West is the driest city in Florida, and most of the Florida Keys can become quite dry at the height of the dry season. Some of the more exposed vegetation in the keys is scrub, stunted due to the intense sun, quick draining sandy soil, and arid winter climate.

Climate data for Key West Int'l, Florida (1991–2020 normals, (Note: Mean monthly maxima and minima (i.e. the highest and lowest temperature readings during an entire month or year) calculated based on data at said location from 1991 to 2020.) extremes 1872−present) (Note: Official records for Key West were kept at the Weather Bureau in downtown from January 1871 to February 1958, and at Key West Int'l since March 1958. For more information, see ThreadEx.)
Month	Jan	Feb	Mar	Apr	May	Jun	Jul	Aug	Sep	Oct	Nov	Dec	Year
Record high °F (°C)	90 (32)	87 (31)	89 (32)	91 (33)	94 (34)	96 (36)	97 (36)	97 (36)	95 (35)	93 (34)	91 (33)	88 (31)	97 (36)
Mean maximum °F (°C)	81.9 (27.7)	82.5 (28.1)	84.1 (28.9)	86.2 (30.1)	88.8 (31.6)	91.0 (32.8)	92.2 (33.4)	92.3 (33.5)	91.5 (33.1)	89.1 (31.7)	85.4 (29.7)	82.9 (28.3)	92.7 (33.7)
Mean daily maximum °F (°C)	75.8 (24.3)	77.4 (25.2)	79.6 (26.4)	82.6 (28.1)	85.9 (29.9)	88.7 (31.5)	90.2 (32.3)	90.6 (32.6)	89.0 (31.7)	85.8 (29.9)	81.0 (27.2)	77.7 (25.4)	83.7 (28.7)
Daily mean °F (°C)	70.6 (21.4)	72.3 (22.4)	74.4 (23.6)	77.9 (25.5)	81.1 (27.3)	84.1 (28.9)	85.4 (29.7)	85.5 (29.7)	84.1 (28.9)	81.3 (27.4)	76.6 (24.8)	73.0 (22.8)	78.9 (26.1)
Mean daily minimum °F (°C)	65.5 (18.6)	67.1 (19.5)	69.3 (20.7)	73.1 (22.8)	76.4 (24.7)	79.4 (26.3)	80.6 (27.0)	80.5 (26.9)	79.2 (26.2)	76.8 (24.9)	72.2 (22.3)	68.3 (20.2)	74.0 (23.3)
Mean minimum °F (°C)	51.8 (11.0)	55.0 (12.8)	58.5 (14.7)	63.6 (17.6)	69.5 (20.8)	73.5 (23.1)	74.5 (23.6)	74.1 (23.4)	74.1 (23.4)	69.3 (20.7)	62.4 (16.9)	56.6 (13.7)	50.1 (10.1)
Record low °F (°C)	41 (5)	44 (7)	47 (8)	48 (9)	63 (17)	65 (18)	68 (20)	68 (20)	64 (18)	59 (15)	49 (9)	44 (7)	41 (5)
Average precipitation inches (mm)	1.83 (46)	1.54 (39)	1.53 (39)	2.07 (53)	3.12 (79)	4.23 (107)	3.63 (92)	5.37 (136)	7.24 (184)	5.67 (144)	2.05 (52)	2.15 (55)	40.44 (1,027)
Average precipitation days (≥ 0.01 in)	6.9	4.9	4.8	4.5	7.5	11.2	11.6	14.6	15.8	12.1	6.3	6.4	106.6
Average relative humidity (%)	76.0	74.3	73.0	70.1	71.8	74.0	72.2	73.4	75.3	75.1	76.0	76.2	74.0
Average dew point °F (°C)	61.3 (16.3)	61.2 (16.2)	63.9 (17.7)	65.8 (18.8)	70.0 (21.1)	73.6 (23.1)	74.3 (23.5)	74.7 (23.7)	74.3 (23.5)	70.9 (21.6)	66.7 (19.3)	63.1 (17.3)	68.3 (20.2)
Mean monthly sunshine hours	249.6	245.4	308.8	324.6	340.3	314.0	325.2	306.6	269.6	254.7	230.9	234.5	3,404.2
Percentage possible sunshine	75	77	83	85	82	77	78	76	73	71	70	71	77
Source: NOAA (relative humidity, dew point and sun 1961−1990)

=== Tropical cyclones ===
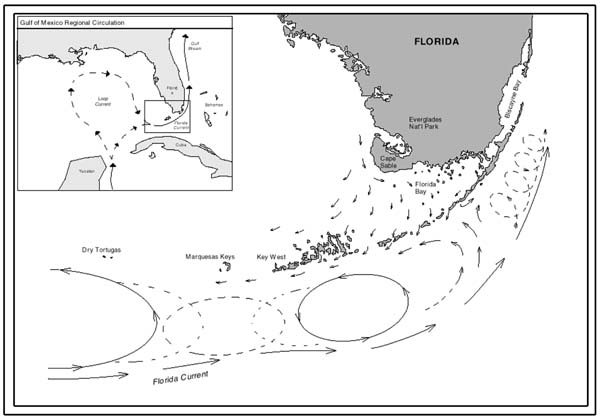
Typical current flows throughout the Florida Keys (NOAA June 2010)

The Keys are occasionally threatened by tropical storms and hurricanes, leading to evacuations to the mainland. Hurricane Georges, after destroying much of the housing and infrastructure on many of the Caribbean islands, caused damage and extensive flooding in the Lower Keys in 1998, before making landfall in Mississippi. In 2005, Hurricanes Katrina, Rita and Wilma affected the Keys (although none made a direct hit), causing widespread damage and flooding. The most severe hurricane to hit the area was the Labor Day Hurricane of 1935, a Category 5 hurricane.

Tropical cyclones present special dangers and challenges to the entire Keys. Because no area of the islands is more than 20 feet (6.1 m) above sea level (and many are only a few feet elevation), and water surrounds the islands, nearly every neighborhood is subject to flooding as well as hurricane winds. In response, many homes in the Keys are built on concrete stilts with the first floor being not legally habitable and enclosed by breakaway walls that are not strongly attached to the rest of the house. Nonetheless, Monroe County, as reported in the Federal Register, has estimated that there are between 8,000 and 12,000 illegal enclosures inhabited by people.

Because of the threat from storm surge, evacuations are routinely ordered when the National Weather Service issues a hurricane watch or warning, and are sometimes ordered for a tropical storm warning. Evacuation of the Keys depends on causeways and the two-lane highway to the mainland. Time estimates for evacuating the entire Keys range from 12 to 24 hours. Evacuation estimates are significant in emergency planning, of course, but also because they are a factor in local and state regulations for controlling development. The building permit allocation was increased in 2005 when local governments reduced estimates for evacuation.

On September 10, 2017, Hurricane Irma made landfall in Cudjoe Key. The storm destroyed an estimated 25% of the houses on the Keys and another 65% suffered major damage. Most residents had evacuated before the storm hit the area. On September 12, parts of the Keys were still inaccessible by causeway and some areas were closed to the public. Governor Rick Scott reported devastation; most areas were without power or water. The damage was the worst in the Lower Keys, though less severe in Key West; parts of the Lower Keys may be uninhabitable for months.

== Major islands ==
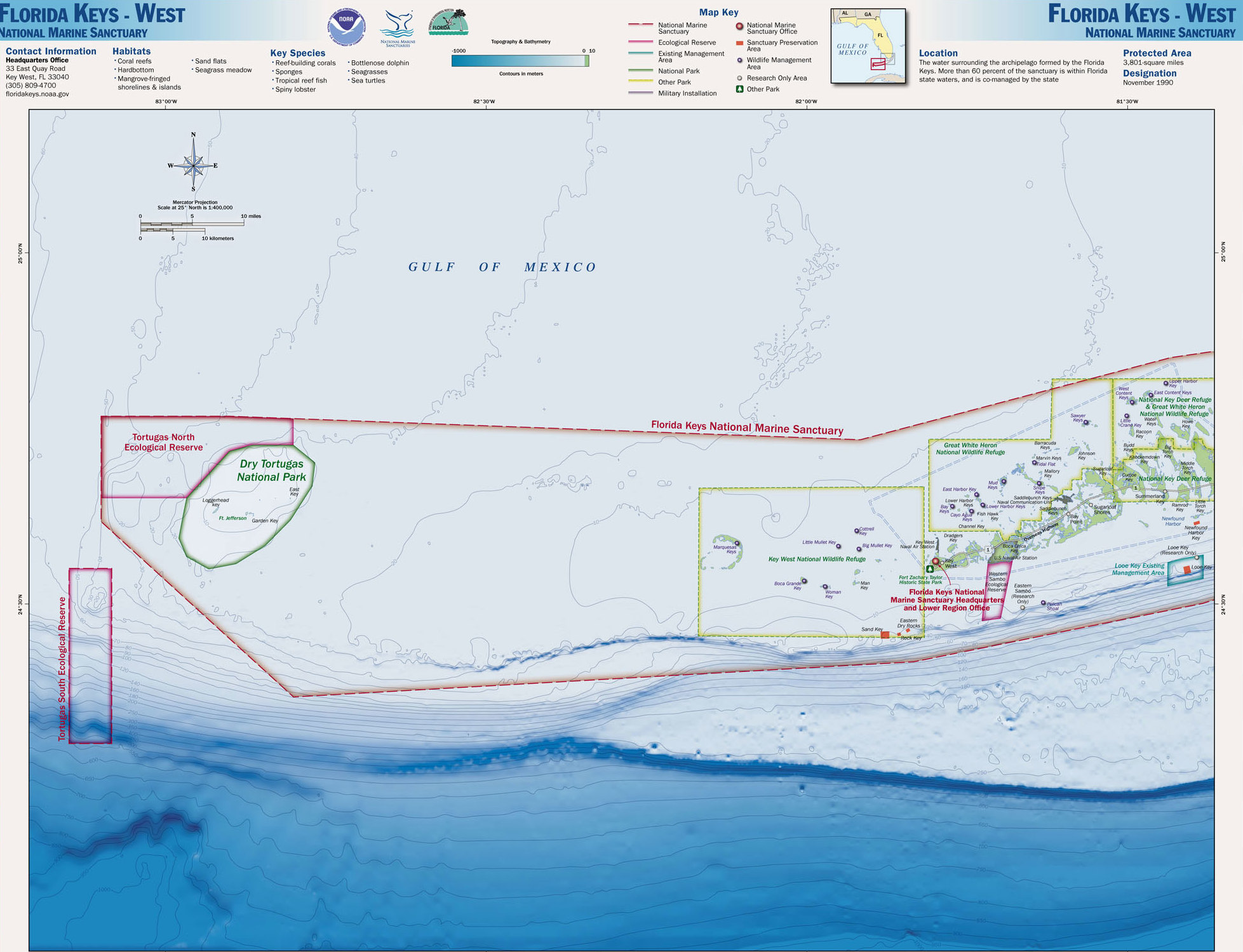
Map of the Florida Keys, from the Dry Tortugas to Little Torch Key, showing boundaries of National Marine Sanctuaries

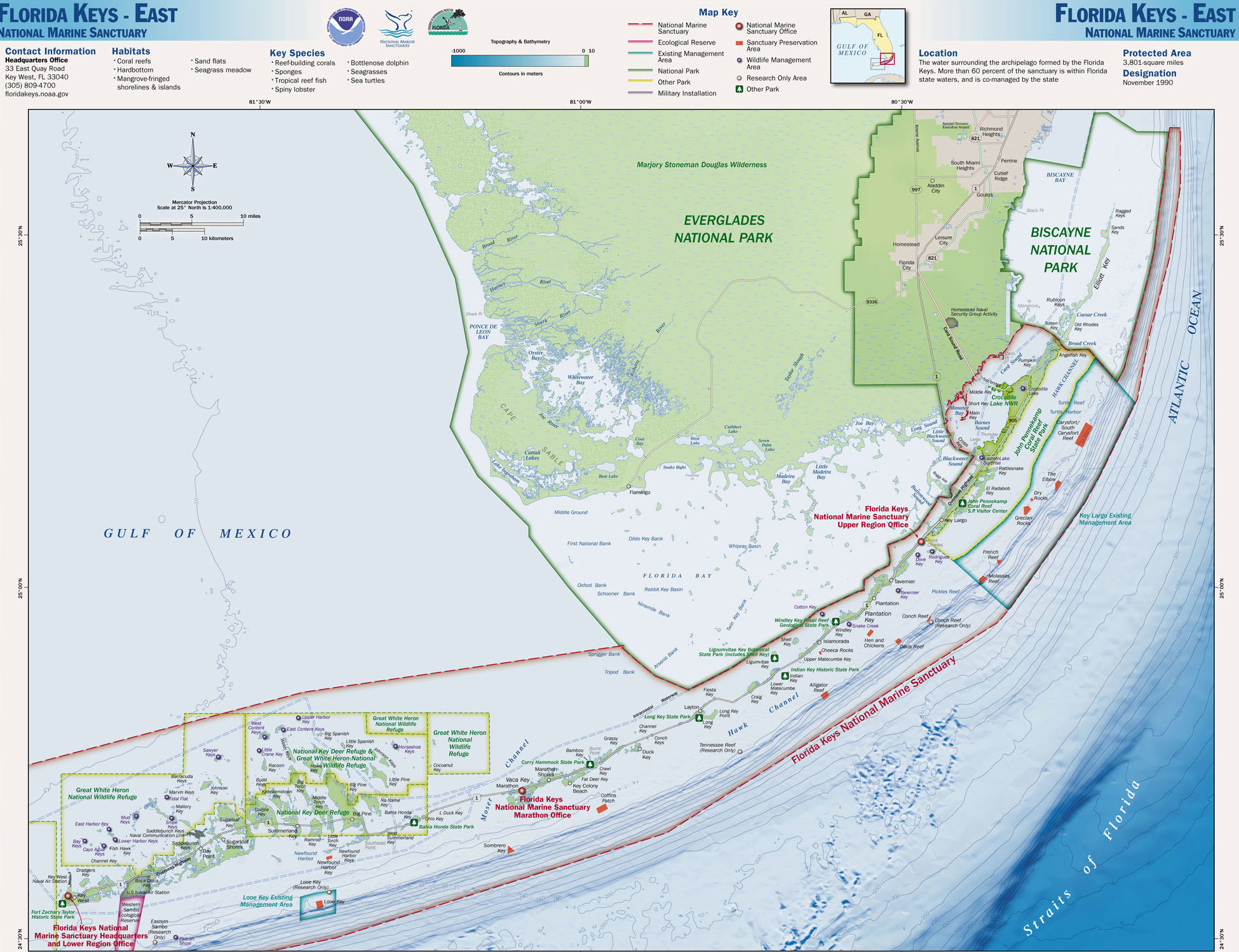
Map of the Florida Keys, from Key West to the Ragged Keys in Biscayne National Park, showing boundaries of National Marine Sanctuaries (overlaps map above from Key West to Little Torch Key)

U.S. Highway 1, the "Overseas Highway", runs over most of the inhabited islands of the Florida Keys. The islands are listed in order from southwest to north. Mile markers are listed for keys that the Overseas Highway runs across or near:

- Dry Tortugas
- Loggerhead Key
- Marquesas Keys
- Sunset Key
- Wisteria Island
- Key West (MM 0–4)
- Fleming Key
- Sigsbee Park (off to the north at MM 2¾)
- Stock Island (MM 5)
- Raccoon Key (off to the north at MM 5¼)
- Boca Chica Key (MM 7–8)
- Rockland Key (MM 9)
- East Rockland Key (MM 9½)
- Big Coppitt Key (MM 10)
- Geiger Key (off to the south at MM 10¾)
- Shark Key (off to the north at MM 11¼)
- Saddlebunch Keys (MM 12–16)
- Lower Sugarloaf Key (MM 17)
- Park Key (MM 18)
- Sugarloaf Key (MM 19–20)
- Cudjoe Key (MM 21–23)
- Knockemdown Key
- Summerland Key (MM 24–25)
- Ramrod Key (MM 27)
- Middle Torch Key, Big Torch Key (off to the north at MM 27¾)
- Little Torch Key (MM 28½)
- Big Pine Key (MM 30–32)
- No Name Key
- Scout Key (MM 34–35), formerly known as West Summerland Key
- Bahia Honda Key (MM 37–38)
- Ohio Key (MM 38¾), also known as Sunshine Key
- Missouri Key (MM 39¼)
- Little Duck Key (MM 39¾)

The Seven Mile Bridge (MM 40–46¾) separates the Lower Keys from the Middle Keys:

- Pigeon Key (off to the north near MM 45; access is at MM 46¾)
- Knights Key (MM 47)
- Vaca Key (MM 48–53)
- Boot Key (off to the south at MM 48; bridge closed)
- Fat Deer Key (MM 53¼-55)
- Shelter Key (off to the south at MM 53¾)
- Long Point Key (MM 56)
- Crawl Key (MM 56½)
- Grassy Key (MM 58–60)

(Knights, Vaca, Boot, Long Point, Crawl, and Grassy Keys, as well as most of Fat Deer Key, are incorporated in the city of Marathon. The remaining portion of Fat Deer Key and most of Shelter Key are part of Key Colony Beach.):

- Duck Key (MM 61)
- Conch Key (MM 62–63)

The Long Key Bridge (MM 63¼-65¼) separates the Middle Keys from the Upper Keys:

- Long Key (MM 66–70), formerly known as Rattlesnake Key
- Fiesta Key (off to the north at MM 70)
- Craig Key (MM 72)
- Lower Matecumbe Key (MM 74–77)
- Lignumvitae Key
- Indian Key
- Indian Key Fill (MM 79)
- Tea Table (MM 79½)
- Upper Matecumbe Key (MM 80–83)
- Windley Key (MM 85)
- Plantation Key (MM 86–90)

(Lower Matecumbe through Plantation Keys are incorporated as Islamorada, Village of Islands. The "towns" of Key Largo, North Key Largo and Tavernier, all on the island of Key Largo, are not incorporated.):

- Key Largo (MM 91–107)
- Tavernier Key
- Rodriguez Key

All keys north of Broad Creek are in Biscayne National Park and Miami-Dade County. The following are "true" Florida Keys (exposed ancient coral reefs):

- Old Rhodes Key
- Totten Key
- Reid Key
- Rubicon Keys
- Adams Key
- Elliott Key

The following are "transitional keys", made of exposed ancient reef surrounded by sand:

- Sands Key
- Boca Chita Key
- Ragged Keys
- Soldier Key

Key Biscayne is not one of the Florida Keys, but the southernmost of the barrier islands along the Atlantic coast of Florida.

== Transportation ==
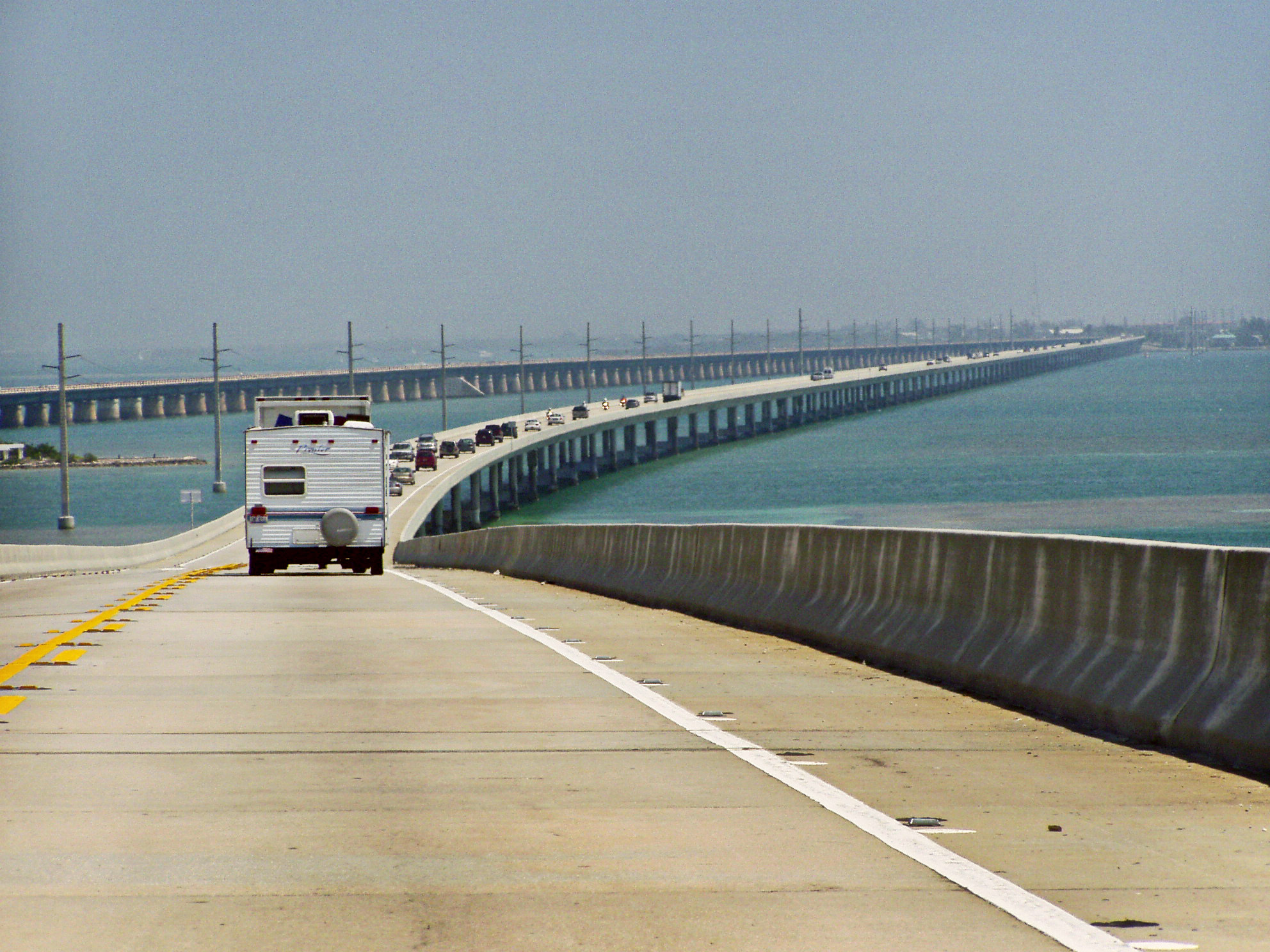
The Seven Mile Bridge is part of the Overseas Highway.

The main chain of Keys islands can be traveled by motor vehicles on the Overseas Highway, a 127-mile (204 km) section of U.S. 1, which runs from Key West to Fort Kent, Maine in its entirety. The highway was built parallel to the original route of the Overseas Railway, which was not rebuilt following the Labor Day hurricane of 1935. Even before the hurricane, road sections and highway bridges allowed automobile traffic to travel from Miami to Lower Matecumbe Key, where a car ferry connected with another roadway section through the Lower Keys. Following the hurricane, some of the original railway bridges were converted to carry the highway roadbeds. These bridges were used until the 1980s, when new highway bridges were built alongside. Many of the original railroad and highway bridges remain today as pedestrian fishing piers.

=== Public transportation ===
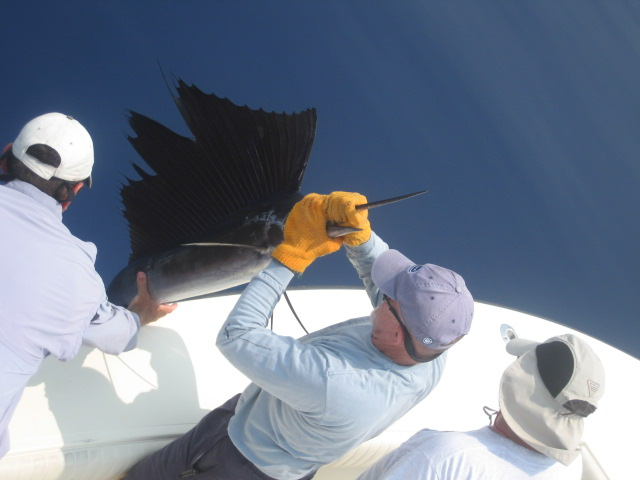
Fishing in the Florida Keys, May 2007

The Florida Keys has public bus transportation.

=== Road hazards ===
Despite this reconstruction, U.S. 1 was not widened on a large scale, and today most of the route consists of just two lanes. Due to their tropical climate, the Florida Keys attract several hundred thousand tourists annually. While some visitors arrive via Key West International Airport and Florida Keys Marathon Airport in Marathon, cruise ship or ferry from Miami, Fort Myers, or Marco Island, Florida, the vast majority of tourists drive down from the mainland on U.S. 1. This influx of traffic, coupled with the two-lane nature of U.S. 1 through most of its length in the Keys, and the fact that no alternative road routes are available mean that Monroe County has the highest per capita rate of fatal automobile accidents in the state of Florida.

== Culture and recreation ==
The major industries are fishing and tourism, including ecotourism, with many visitors scuba diving in the area's protected waters. A ferry takes riders between Key West and Fort Myers, as well as Marco Island due north on the mainland, along the western edge of Florida Bay.

=== Dark skies recreation ===
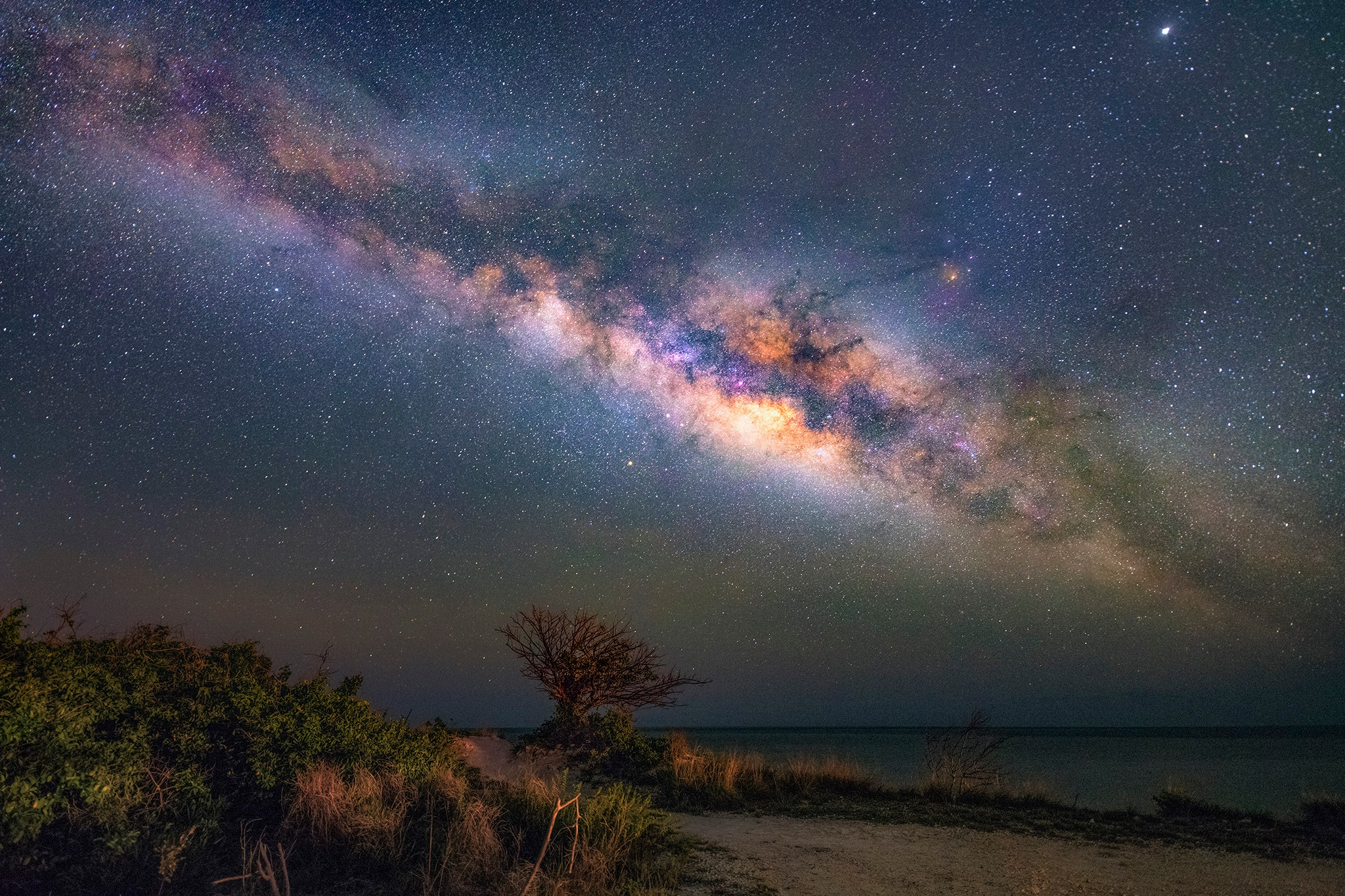
25s long exposure of Milky Way at Scout Key, April 2018

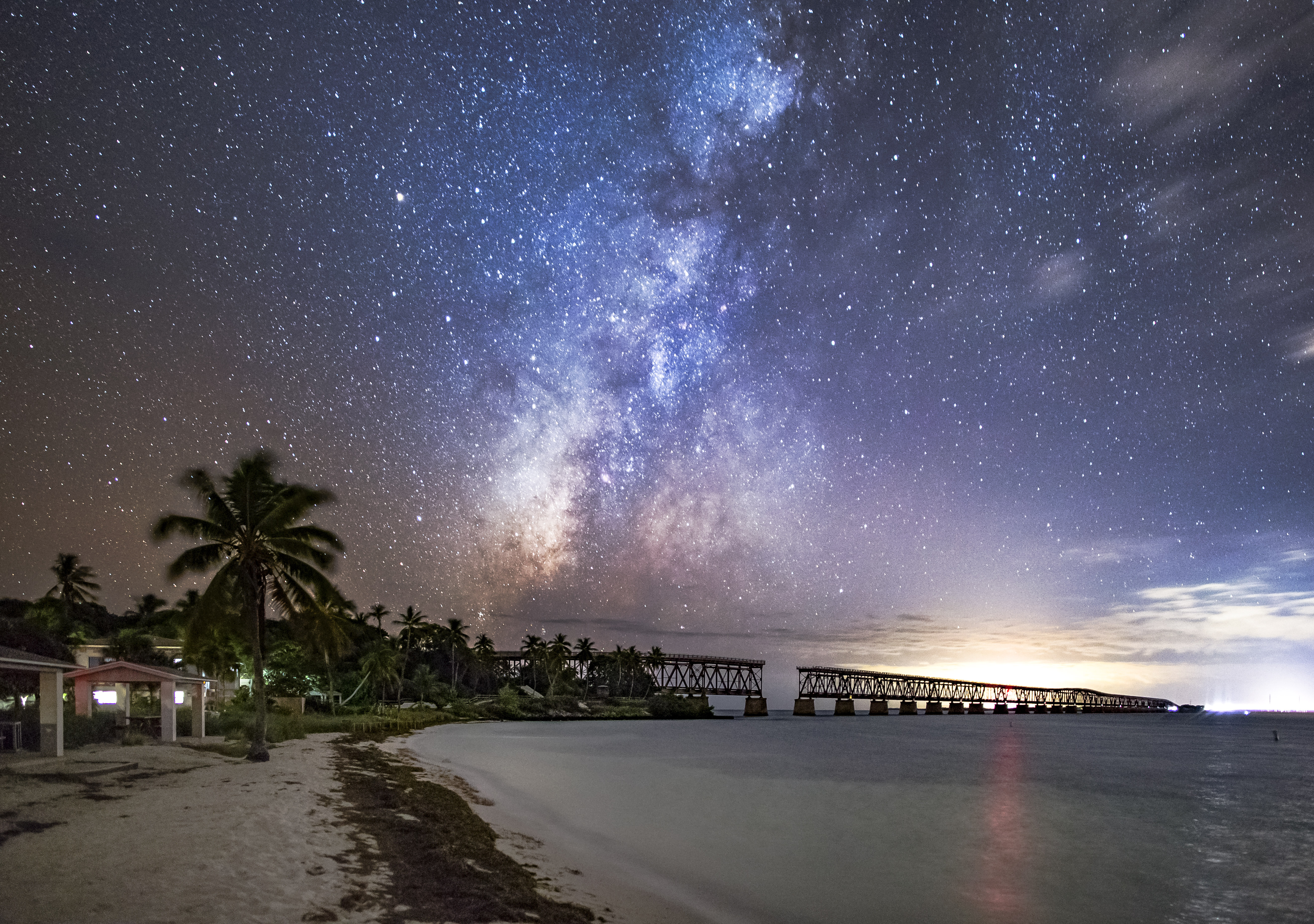
20s long exposure of Bahia Honda State Park Milky Way, October 2016

Middle and Lower Florida Keys are among a few remaining South Florida dark skies locations accessible by car, thanks to their position along the Atlantic Ocean, and therefore with southern skies unobstructed by light pollution associated with urban development.

Scout Key is home to Winter Star Party, a prominent annual amateur astronomy event in the United States, and one of the Top 10 star parties in the world according to BBC Sky at Night. It is an international gathering that attracts 500+ people each year who enjoy stargazing, astrophotography and Milky Way photography.

Bahia Honda State Park is a well known dark skies location among locals offering unobstructed views of the southern night sky year-round. It also hosts amateur astronomy gatherings.

== See also ==
- Adam's Bridge
- Florida Reef

== Other references ==
- Jeff, Ripple (1995). The Florida Keys: the Natural Wonders of an Island Paradise, Photographs by Bill Keogh, Stillwater, Minnesota: Voyageur Press. ISBN 0-89658-262-0.
- Jason Project The Story of Water Movement and Land Formation – accessed January 28, 2006.
- About the Florida Keys
- Florida Keys Fish
