= Big Coppitt Key =

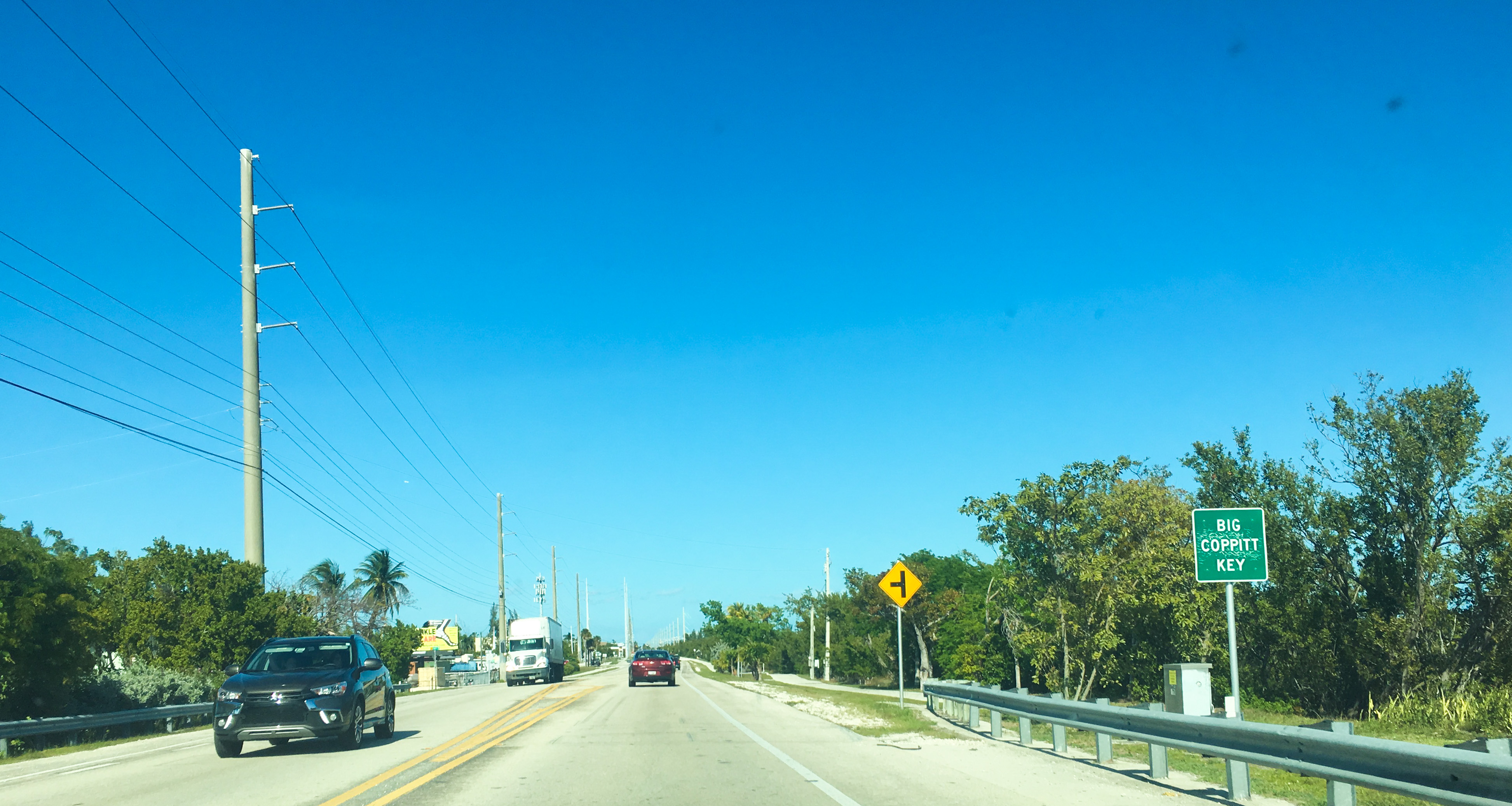
- Big Coppitt Key, as seen northbound on U.S. 1

- Big Coppitt Key Big Coppitt Key (the Caribbean)

Geography
- Location: Gulf of Mexico
- Coordinates: 24°35′52″N 81°39′24″W
- Archipelago: Florida Keys
- Adjacent to: Florida Straits

Administration
- United States
- State: Florida
- County: Monroe

Big Coppitt Key is an island in Monroe County, Florida, United States, in the lower Florida Keys. The name is said to be a derivation of the old English word "coppice", meaning thicket. According to A.D. Bache, in the notes for his coast survey conducted in 1861, this key was the location of Happy Jack's plantation in 1855.

== Geography ==
Big Coppitt Key is located at 24°35′52″N 81°39′24″W (24.597677, -81.656546).

U.S. 1 (the Overseas Highway) crosses the key at approximately mile markers 9.5-11, between East Rockland Key and the Saddlebunch Keys.

== About the island ==
There are several businesses on Big Coppitt Key. There is also a Monroe County Fire/Rescue Station located on the island. Law enforcement services are handled by the Monroe County Sheriff's Office. There are three churches located on Big Coppitt Key. The key features three parks, including one with a playground and another with a basketball court, in the avenues section. A cemetery is located at Avenue A and 4th Street.

In 2005, Hurricane Wilma caused catastrophic damage to the island; many structures were either destroyed or rendered almost uninhabitable due to flood damage.

More recently, in 2017, Hurricane Irma caused similarly catastrophic damage; most homes were left uninhabitable due to severe wind and water damage. However, damage to the island's world-famous Bobalu's Southern Cafe was light because of proper preparation. They boarded up their windows and took in their outdoor furniture and signs, saving the landmark.

== Big Coppitt Key, Florida ==
Big Coppitt Key, Florida
- Census-designated place
- Location in Monroe County and the state of Florida

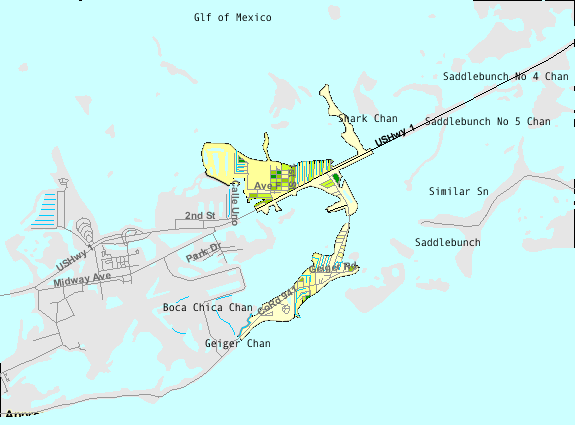
- U.S. Census Bureau map showing CDP boundaries
- Coordinates: 24°35′12″N 81°39′04″W
- Country: United States
- State: Florida
- County: Monroe

Area
  - Total: 1.84 sq mi (4.77 km^{2})
  - Land: 1.15 sq mi (2.99 km^{2})
  - Water: 0.69 sq mi (1.78 km^{2})
- Elevation: 0 ft (0 m)

Population (2020)
  - Total: 2,869
  - Density: 2,486.5/sq mi (960.06/km^{2})
- Time zone: UTC-5 (Eastern (EST))
  - Summer (DST): UTC-4 (EDT)
- ZIP Code: 33040 (Key West)
- FIPS code: 12-06350
- GNIS feature ID: 2402687

Big Coppitt Key is the name of a census-designated place and unincorporated community that occupies Big Coppitt Key and the neighboring islands of Geiger Key and Shark Key. As of the 2020 census, it had a population of 2,869. According to the United States Census Bureau, the CDP has a total area of 1.84 square miles (4.8 km^{2}), of which 1.15 square miles (3.0 km^{2}) are land and 0.69 square miles (1.8 km^{2}), or 37.38%, are water.

=== Demographics ===
Historical population
Census	Pop.	Note	%±
1980	1,856		—
1990	2,388		28.7%
2000	2,595		8.7%
2010	2,458		−5.3%
2020	2,869		16.7%

==== 2020 census ====
Big Coppitt Key racial composition
Race	Number	Percentage
White (non-Hispanic)	1,829	63.75%
Black or African American (non-Hispanic)	148	5.16%
Native American	4	0.14%
Asian	55	1.92%
Pacific Islander	3	0.1%
Other/Mixed	105	3.66%
Hispanic or Latino	725	25.27%

As of the 2020 United States census, there were 2,869 people, 1,082 households, and 617 families residing in the CDP.

==== 2000 census ====
As of the census of 2000, there were 2,595 people, 1,108 households, and 681 families residing in the CDP. The population density was 726.0 people/km^{2} (1,880 people/mi^{2}). There were 1,332 housing units at an average density of 372.7 units/km^{2} (965 units/mi^{2}). The racial makeup of the CDP was 92.91% White, 1.08% African American, 0.81% Native American, 1.46% Asian, 0.08% Pacific Islander, 1.04% from other races, and 2.62% from two or more races. Hispanic or Latino of any race were 16.76% of the population.

There were 1,108 households, out of which 24.2% had children under the age of 18 living with them, 46.4% were married couples living together, 7.9% had a female householder with no husband present, and 38.5% were non-families. 26.1% of all households were made up of individuals, and 6.6% had someone living alone who was 65 years of age or older. The average household size was 2.34 and the average family size was 2.77.

In the CDP, the population was spread out, with 19.3% under the age of 18, 5.9% from 18 to 24, 32.4% from 25 to 44, 30.8% from 45 to 64, and 11.5% who were 65 years of age or older. The median age was 41 years. For every 100 females there were 119.4 males. For every 100 females age 18 and over, there were 114.5 males.

The median income for a household in the CDP was $45,194, and the median income for a family was $49,783. Males had a median income of $31,915 versus $27,721 for females. The per capita income for the CDP was $24,022. About 6.1% of families and 8.6% of the population were below the poverty line, including 9.7% of those under age 18 and 7.5% of those age 65 or over.

== Gallery ==
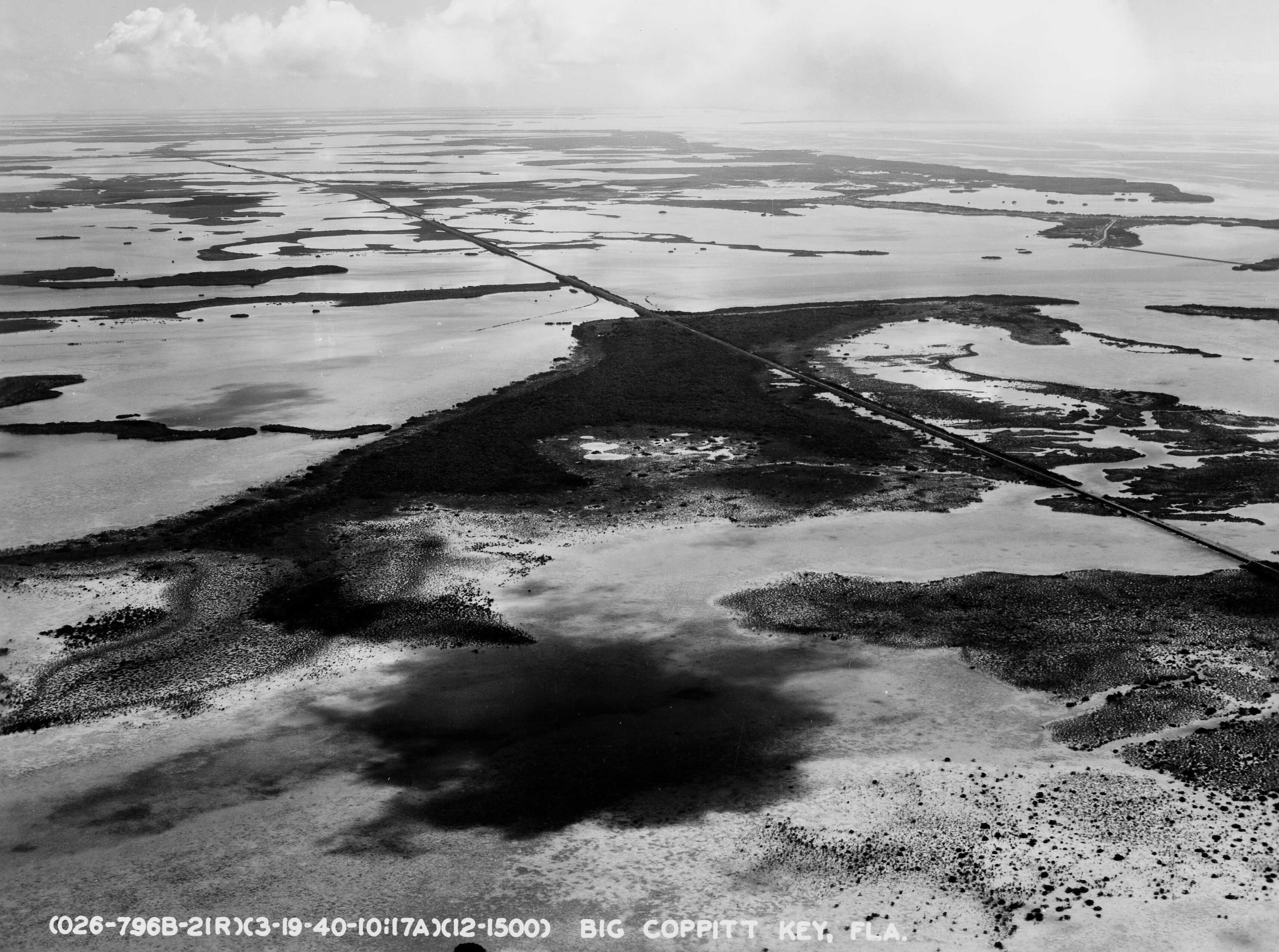
Aerial view, 1940

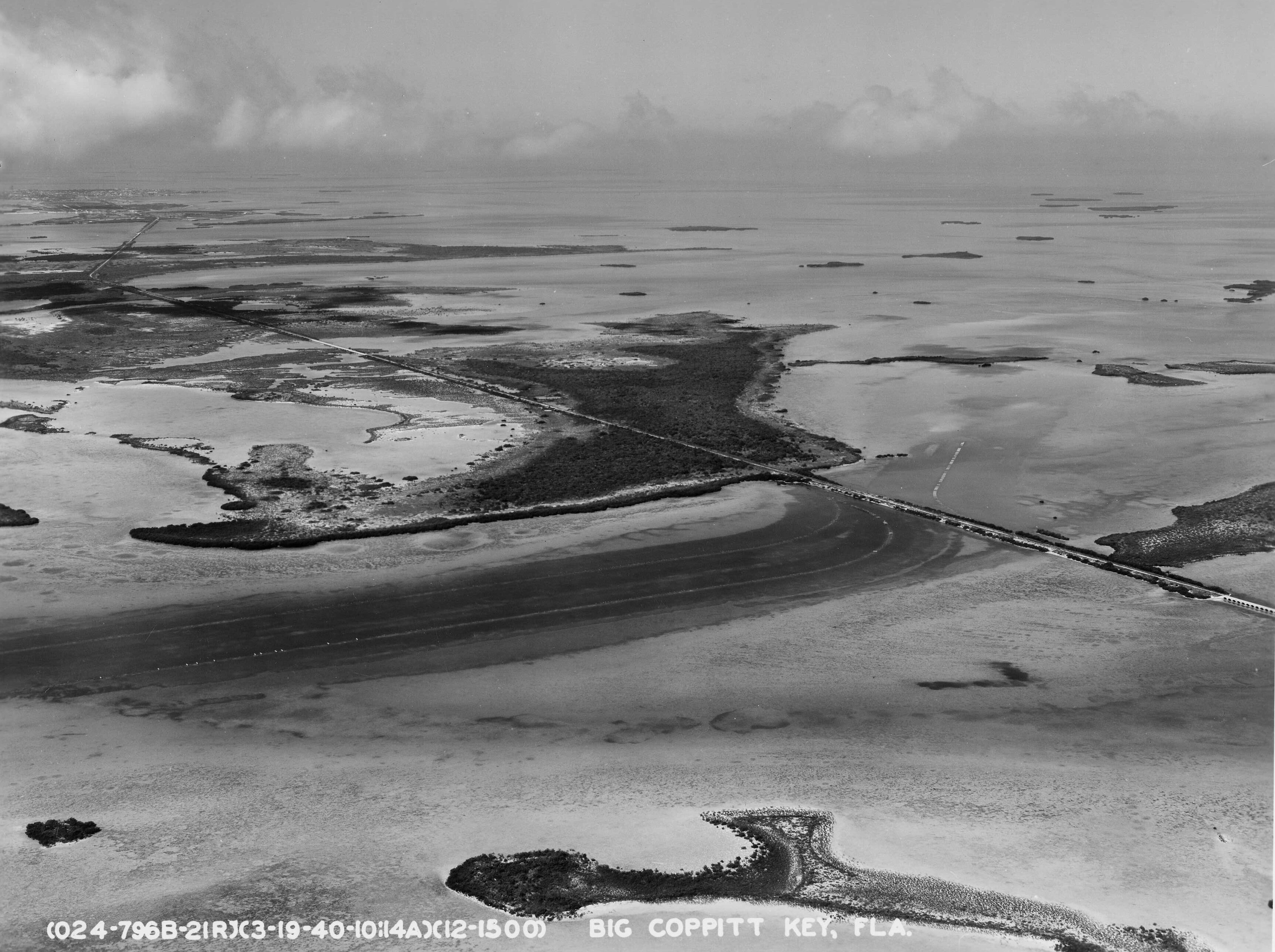
Aerial view, 1940

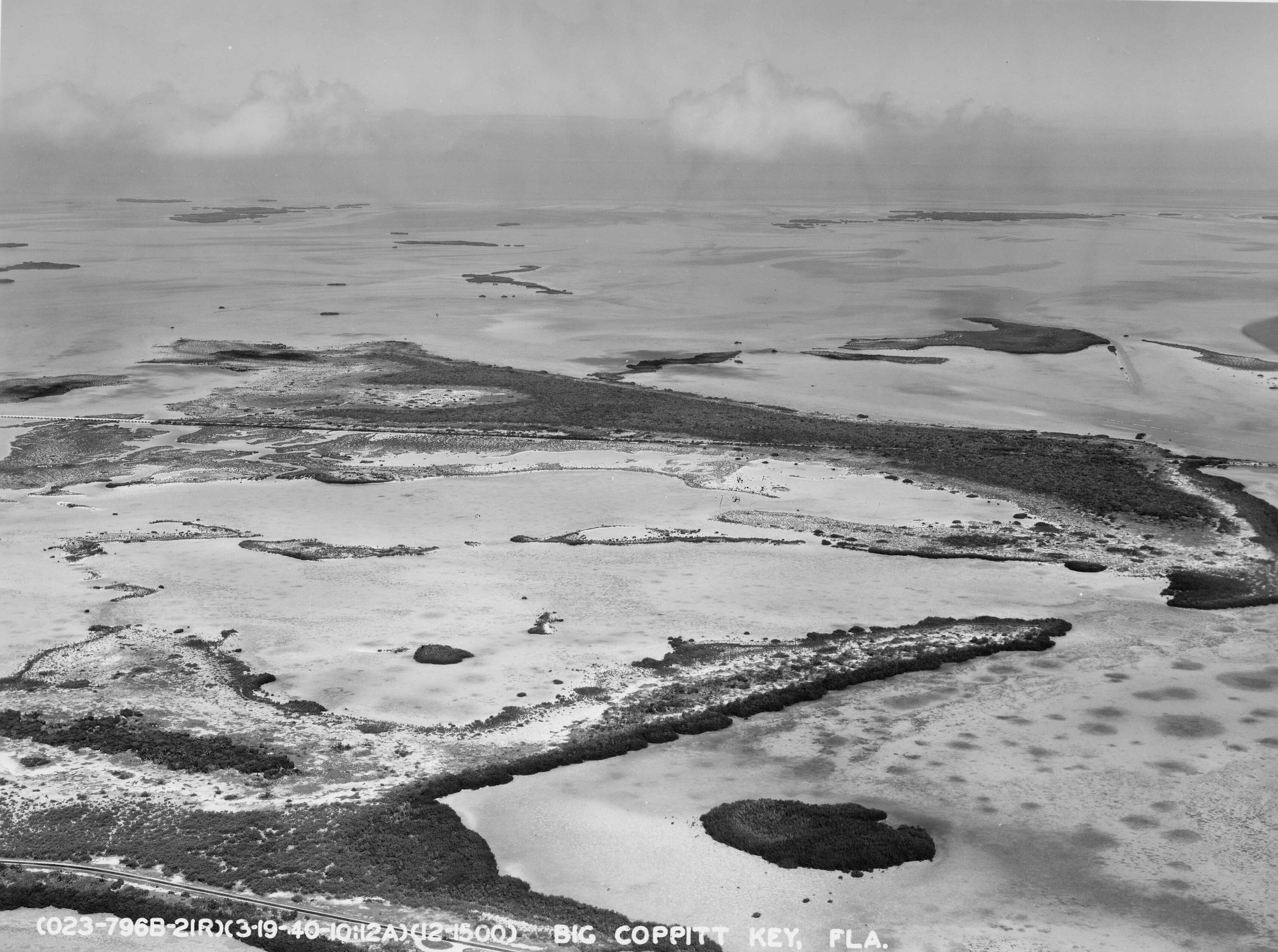
Aerial view, 1940
