= Totten Key =

Island of the upper Florida Keys in Biscayne National Park

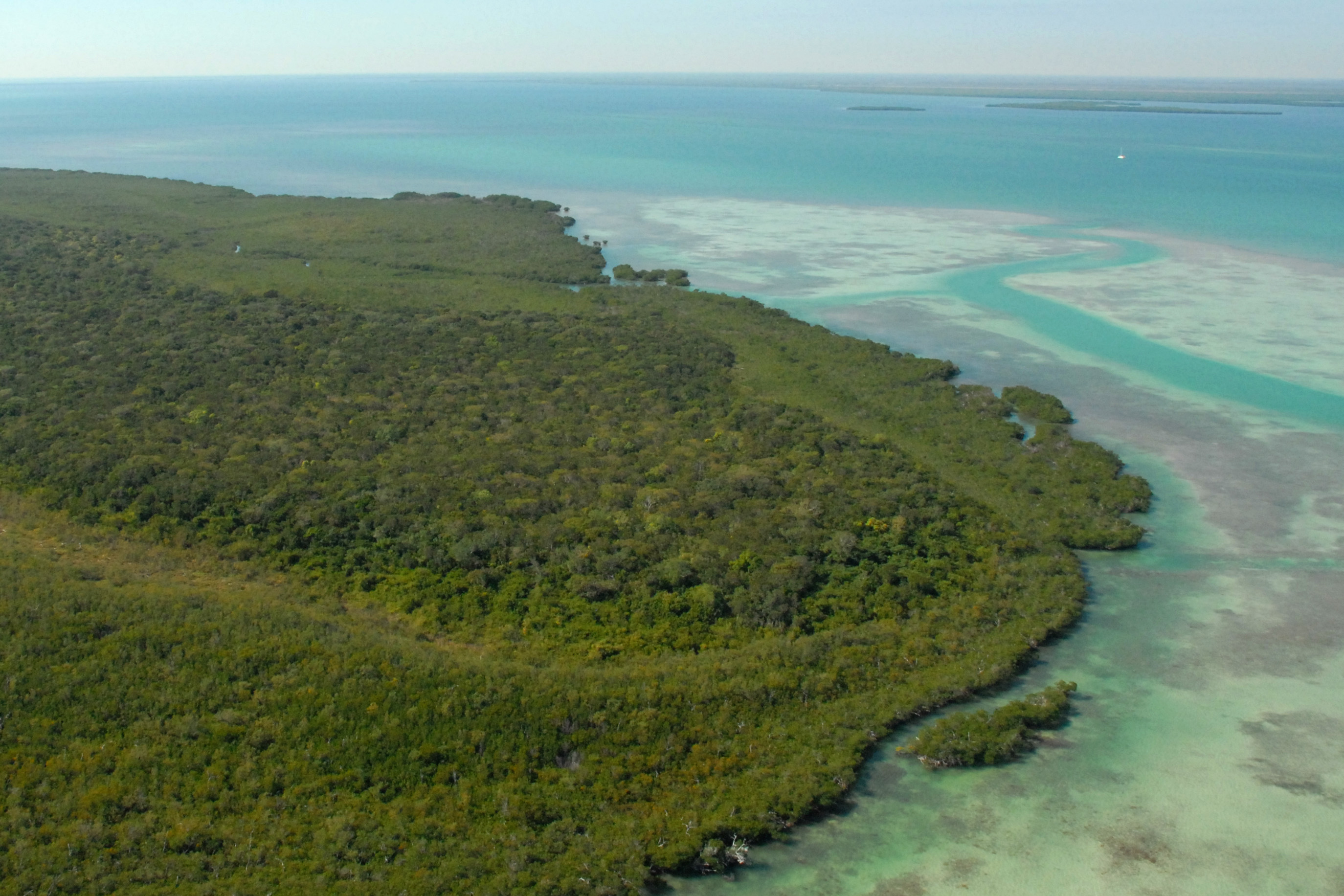
- Totten Key

- Totten Key Totten Key (North Atlantic)

Geography
- Location: Atlantic Ocean
- Coordinates: 25.3796°N 80.2484°W

Administration
- United States
- State: Florida
- County: Miami-Dade

Totten Key is an island of the upper Florida Keys in Biscayne National Park. It is in Miami-Dade County, Florida.

It is located in southern Biscayne Bay, just west of Old Rhodes Key.

== History ==
It was probably named for General Joseph Gilbert Totten who was Chief of Engineers for the U.S. Army. In 1848, Totten was in charge of a survey of the Florida coast concentrating on Biscayne Bay, with Robert E. Lee as a subordinate.

U.S. Coast Survey chart #68, Florida Reefs, Key Biscayne to Carysfort Reef (1858) has Totten's Key.
