= Old Rhodes Key =

Island north of the upper Florida Keys in Biscayne National Park

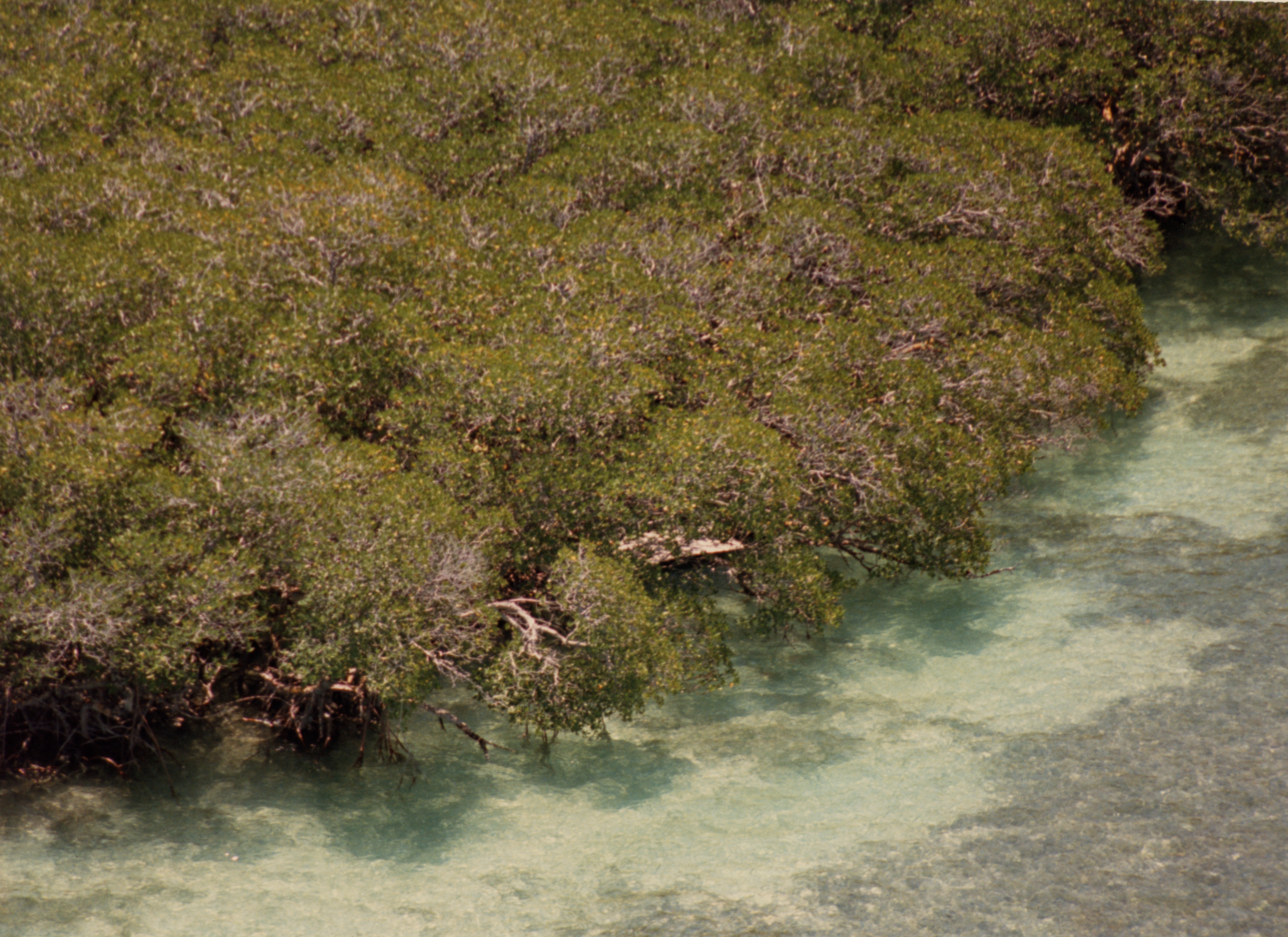
- Aerial view of Old Rhodes Key, October 1987

- Old Rhodes Key Old Rhodes Key (North Atlantic)

Geography
- Location: Atlantic Ocean
- Coordinates: 25.365957°N 80.241866°W

Administration
- United States
- State: Florida
- County: Miami-Dade

Old Rhodes Key is an island north of the upper Florida Keys in Biscayne National Park. It is in Miami-Dade County, Florida.

It is located just north of Broad Creek in the lower part of Biscayne Bay.

== History ==
Some of the earlier names for this island may have been "Old Road", "Jenyns Island", "Jenning's Island" and "Jenkyns".
