= National Register of Historic Places listings in Biscayne National Park =

This is a list of the National Register of Historic Places listings in Biscayne National Park.

This is intended to be a complete list of the properties and districts on the National Register of Historic Places in Biscayne National Park, Florida, United States. The locations of National Register properties and districts for which the latitude and longitude coordinates are included below, may be seen in a Google map.

There are six properties and districts listed on the National Register in the park.

This National Park Service list is complete through NPS recent listings posted June 27, 2025.

== Current listings ==
	Name on the Register	Image	Date listed	Location	City or town	Description
1	Boca Chita Key Historic District	Boca Chita Key Historic District	August 1, 1997 (#97000795)	Northwestern section of Boca Chita Key, roughly bounded by Biscayne Bay and a stone wall 25°31′23″N 80°10′29″W	Biscayne National Park	
2	Fowey Rocks Light	Fowey Rocks Light	January 26, 2011 (#10001181)	Offshore in Straits of Florida 6.3 miles south southeast of Cape Florida on Key Biscayne, Florida; 25°35′26″N 80°05′48″W	Key Biscayne	(Light Stations of the United States MPS)
3	Jones Family Historic District	Jones Family Historic District	October 23, 2013 (#13000846)	Biscayne National Park; 25°22′37″N 80°14′29″W	Islandia vicinity	
4	Offshore Reefs Archeological District		August 24, 1984 (#84000838)	Address Restricted	Homestead	
5	Populo	Populo	June 15, 2006 (#06000498)	Biscayne National Park; 25°21′51″N 80°09′41″W	Homestead	Part of the 1733 Spanish Plate Fleet Shipwrecks MPS
6	Sweeting Homestead		September 19, 1997 (#97001088)	Address Restricted; 25°27′07″N 80°11′28″W	Biscayne National Park	

== See also ==
- National Register of Historic Places listings in Miami-Dade County, Florida
- National Register of Historic Places listings in Florida
