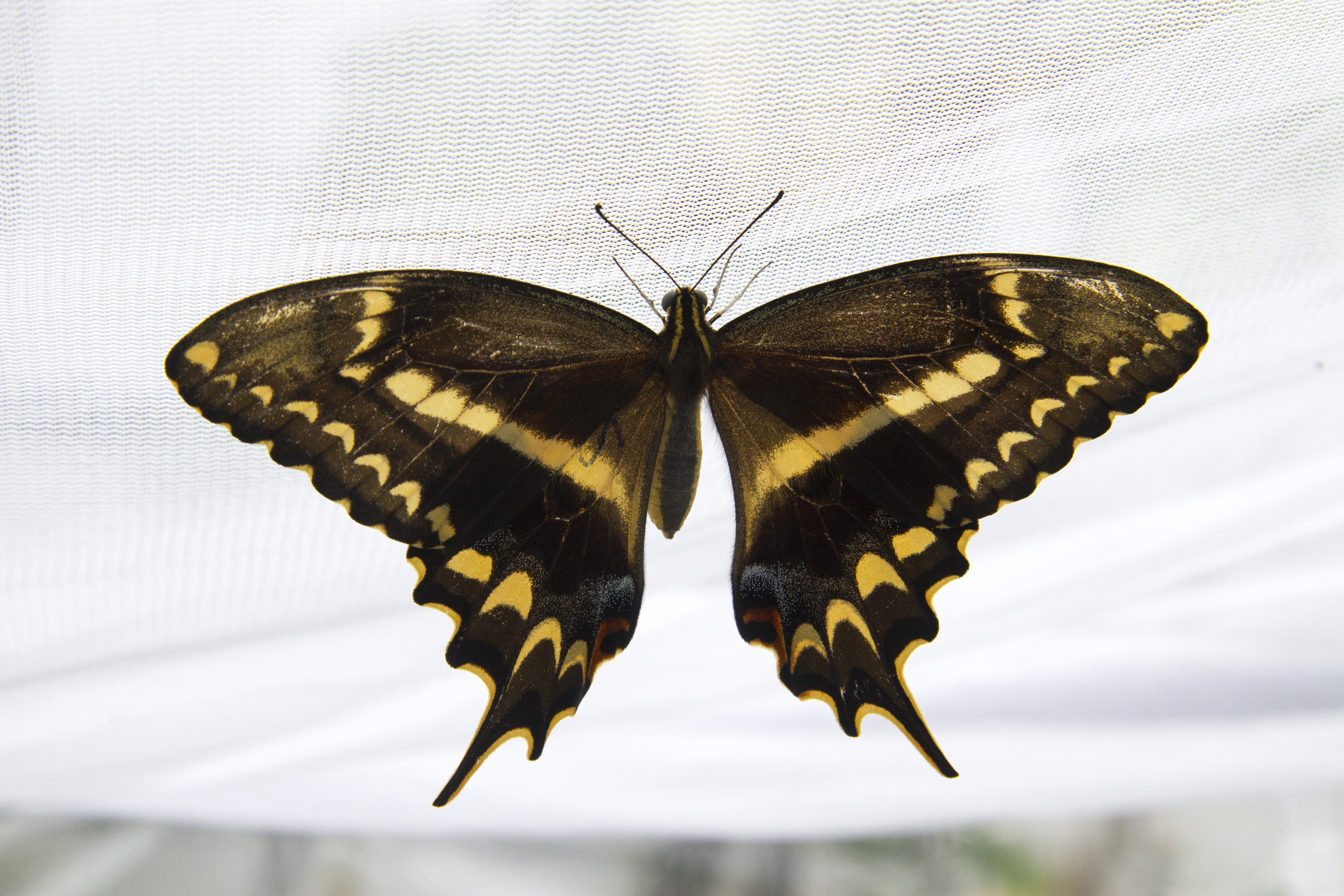

Conservation status
- Least Concern (IUCN 3.1)

- Critically Imperiled (NatureServe)

Scientific classification
- Kingdom: Animalia
- Phylum: Arthropoda
- Clade: Pancrustacea
- Class: Insecta
- Order: Lepidoptera
- Family: Papilionidae
- Genus: Papilio
- Species: P. aristodemus

Binomial name
- Papilio aristodemus Esper, 1794

Synonyms
- Heraclides papilio; Heraclides aristodemus ponceanus

= Papilio aristodemus =

Schaus' swallowtail

Species of butterfly

Papilio aristodemus, the Schaus' swallowtail or island swallowtail, is a species of American butterfly in the family Papilionidae. It is found in southern Florida in the United States and throughout the West Indies. It is named in honor of William Schaus.

== Subspecies ==
There are five subspecies:

- P. a. aristodemus, the nominate subspecies, found on Hispaniola (the Dominican Republic and Haiti) and possibly Puerto Rico.
- P. a. bjordalae, found on Great Inagua in The Bahamas.
- P. a. majasi, found on Crooked and Acklins Islands in The Bahamas.
- P. a. ponceana, found in Southern Florida in the United States. It was elevated to species status in 2020 while its subgenus, Heraclides, has again been elevated to a genus. Heraclides ponceana is considered Critically Imperiled by NatureServe.
- P. a. temenes, found on Cuba and the Cayman Islands.

== Physiology ==
=== Appearance ===
Schaus' swallowtail has black-brown wings with yellow markings and a broad rusty patch underneath the hindwing. The male's antennae are black with a yellow knob, while the female's antennae are all black. Their forewings have a dull yellow median band from the apex to about midpoint of the inner margin, with a short side branch to costa about one-third the distance from the apex. This species may be confused with Papilio cresphontes the giant swallowtail, but they can be differentiated by the small red patch on the ventral wing (within the small blue band) of the giant swallowtail, which the Schaus' swallowtail doesn't have.

=== Body size ===
Schaus' swallowtail has a wingspan of 3 1/4 by 3 3/4 inches (82 by 95 mm).

=== Diet ===
Torchwood is the primary source of food. Adults have been observed taking nectar from blossoms of guava, cheese shrub, hibiscus and wild coffee. Guava, although an exotic, seemed to be the nectar source preferred by individuals. Schaus' swallowtails will fly some distance from their homes to find blooming guava flowers. Caterpillar host plants are in the family Rutaceae and include hoptree (Ptelea trifoliata), citrus species, sea torchwood (Amyris elemifera), and lime prickly-ash (Zanthoxylum fagara).

== Distribution and habitat ==
In the United States, Schaus's swallowtail is indigenous to the southern tip of Florida. Historically it occurred in tropical hardwood hammock from South Miami to Lower Matecumbe Key, Florida. These butterflies inhabit the hardwood hammocks of the area where they prefer to stay out of direct sunlight. While they inhabit the islands around southern Florida, they are known to live at a relatively high elevation (3.0 to 4.6 meters above sea level), staying away from the tidal waters. Today, it is only found around the Florida Keys, mainly in the islands of Biscayne National Park and Key Largo. It is also found in The Bahamas, Hispaniola (the Dominican Republic and Haiti), the Cayman Islands, Cuba, and possibly Puerto Rico.

== Behavior ==
Schaus' swallowtails seem to be territorial. Males are seen to patrol females and investigate other butterflies entering their area. Male butterflies have been reported to patrol tree tops as high as 10 feet (3.0 m) on hot afternoons. They also linger in open areas for female Schaus' swallowtails. The flight pattern is usually rapid and unpredictable at about 1 to 2 m off the ground. Research also notes that male Schaus' swallowtail butterflies are remarkably adapted to flight within hardwood hammocks and are able to pick their way among branches and around spider webs. Schaus' swallowtails spend much of their time within hammocks, particularly where sunlight penetrates to give a dappling effect. Tropical hardwood hammocks are the environment for these butterflies which are found in the Florida Keys and the northern shores of the Florida Bay. Consequently, Florida is the place where Schaus' swallowtails live. Unfortunately, with hurricanes and the destruction of these hammock habitats, the Schaus has lost much of its population. These tropical hardwood hammocks are essential for the butterfly's mating and nectaring activities. The butterfly appears to be diurnal with sightings from as early as 7 am to as late as 7 pm.

=== Flight capability ===
Schaus' swallowtail is capable of flying as far as 5.8 miles (9.3 km) a day and travel between the Florida Keys. In 1986, a Schaus' swallowtail butterfly was seen crossing about 360 m from Old Rhodes Key to Swan Key. This observation indicates that these butterflies can travel across open water for a considerable distances among the Upper Keys and may be able to travel to and from the mainland.

=== Flight season ===
Schaus' swallowtail butterflies have a single annual flight season, primarily in May and June, where adults are active; most sightings have been recorded between mid-April and mid-July. There is only one generation of Schaus' swallowtail butterfly per year and adults are short lived.

== Reproduction ==
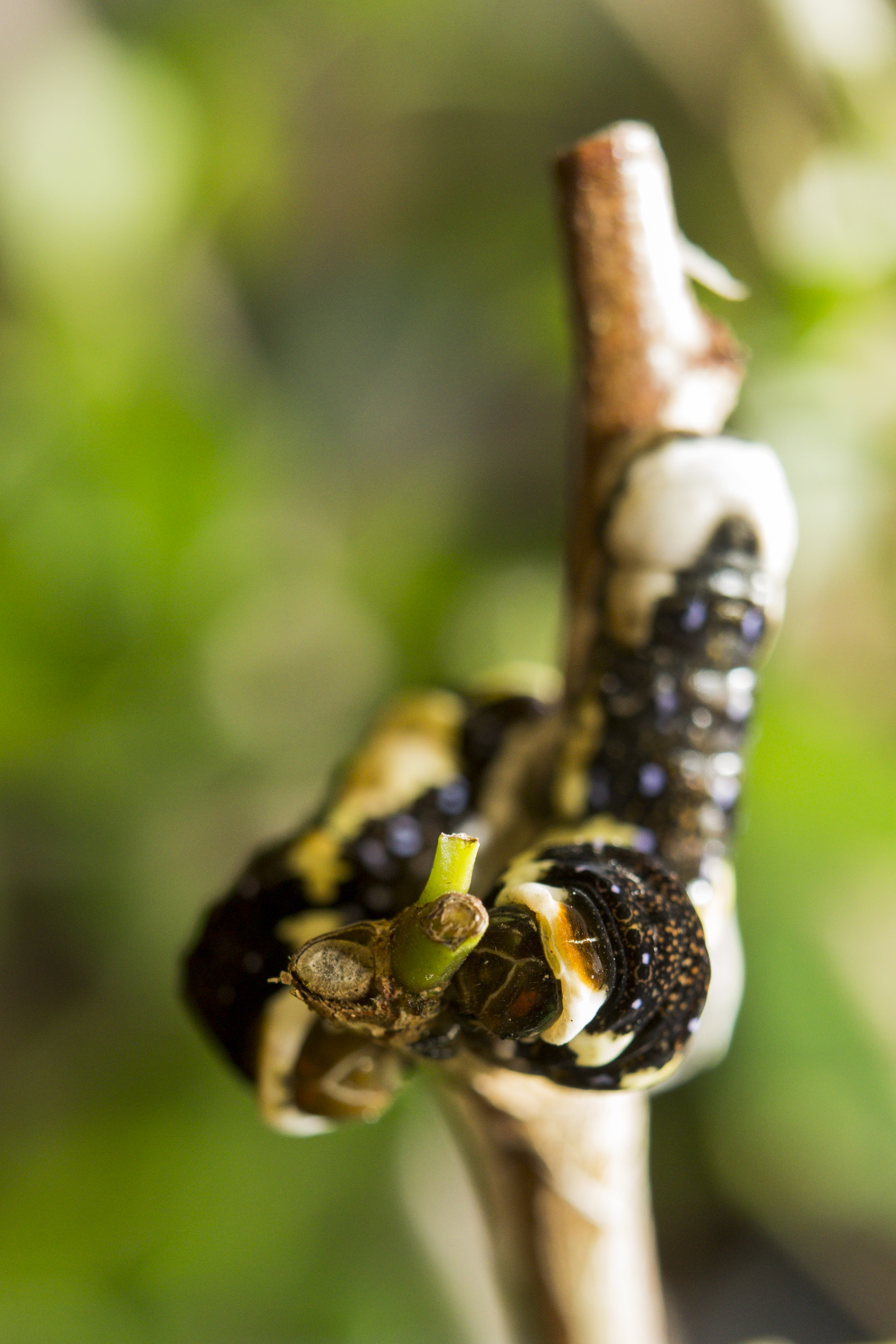
Caterpillar

Papilio aristodemus produces only one generation per year. This fact is in large part the reason that the Schaus are at high risk of endangerment. The female swallowtail lays pinhead-sized eggs on wild lime between April and June. Up to ten days later, the larvae emerge and after three to four weeks later they mature into caterpillars. These caterpillars can grow up to three inches (76 mm) in length. After the caterpillars mature they then pupate (a pupa is an insect at the immobile non-feeding stage of development between larva and adult, and pupating is when many internal changes occur in the pupa stage) and remain in their chrysalis until the following spring. Some caterpillars hibernate in their chrysalids, and they can remain dormant for up to two years. Before the females can lay the eggs however, they must mate with a male. The male butterflies patrol in tree canopies looking for any receptive females.

=== Development ===
The adult emergence of this species is commonly triggered by rainfall. Their primary flight sequences frequently begin in late April to mid-June; however, some adults fly in late July and early September. They have also, over time, developed the unique ability to stop in mid-air and fly backwards in order to avoid their predators, such as birds, lizards, spiders, etc.

==== Caterpillar hosts ====
Caterpillar hosts include plants in the citrus family (Rutaceae), such as citrus species, hop tree (Ptelea trifoliata), Zanthoxylum species, and torchwood (Amyris elemifera).

== Conservation ==
=== Threats ===
S. a. ponceanus was listed as endangered by the United States Fish and Wildlife Service in 1984 due to dramatic declines in numbers and contraction of range. Threats include mosquito control and destruction of its tropical hardwood hammock habitat. Aside from this, they are also known to be susceptible to dramatic weather conditions such as hurricanes and droughts. For instance in 1992, Hurricane Andrew devastated the region and nearly wiped out the entire population of Schaus's swallowtail, leaving only 73 documented individual survivors. It was considered "uncommon and local" on Hispaniola in a 2020 survey (with the Dominican Republic being the only place aside from Florida where records are available), and was considered rare on the Cayman Islands during a report there in 1975.

=== Captive rearing ===
Captive rearing has proven to be a successful method of maintaining the population of swallowtails. Preemptive planning prior to Hurricane Andrew led to the first mating and pupae production in captivity in 1993. In 2011 only 41 individual butterflies were counted. When the 2012 census resulted in only five, emergency procedures were initialized in June 2012. Up to four of the five, including the presumed only female will be caught and held until they will lay eggs. Those eggs will be removed and bred at the University of Florida McGuire Center for Lepidoptera and Biodiversity. The caught butterflies and those bred from the eggs will be set free inside Biscayne National Park. By June 2013 several larvae and one living female with one egg had been taken in custody. In August the National Park Service announced the spotting of 31 adult butterflies, several female laying eggs and a large number of larvae along with nine adult Papilio andraemon, thought to be extinct in the US, on one of the more remote islands of the national park.

Due to the rapid reproduction cycle of butterflies, the breeding program at the University of Florida resulted with more than a thousand larvae within two years. In June 2014 a first batch of eleven adult females, four males and 308 larvae were released on Elliott Key within Biscayne National Park.

== Taxonomy ==
Papilio andraemon is a member of the Papilio thoas species group.
