= Soldier Key =

Island in Biscayne National Park in Miami-Dade County, Florida

- Soldier Key Soldier Key (North Atlantic)

Geography
- Location: Atlantic Ocean
- Coordinates: 25.590214°N 80.161035°W

Administration
- United States
- State: Florida
- County: Miami-Dade

Soldier Key is an island in Biscayne National Park in Miami-Dade County, Florida. It is located between Biscayne Bay and the Atlantic Ocean, about three miles north of the Ragged Keys, five miles south of Cape Florida on Key Biscayne, seven-and-a-half miles east of the mainland and three miles west of Fowey Rocks. It lies on the Safety Valve, a sand bar that separates Biscayne Bay from the Atlantic Ocean and moderates storm surges into the bay.

== Geography ==
The island is small, about 200 yards (200 meters) by 100 yards (100 meters) with a maximum elevation of six feet (under two meters). It is at the southern end of the along-shore movement of sand that feeds the barrier islands to the North (such as Key Biscayne) and is the northernmost exposure of the Key Largo limestone (fossilized coral reef) which forms the "true" Florida Keys. The island is covered by grass and shrub vegetation typical of the Florida Keys. Although the island was described as "thickly wooded" in 1894, as of 1955 the only wooded areas were mangroves on the fringes of the island. Also as of 1955, there were several buildings on the island, and a boat slip protected by jetties.

== History ==
Earlier names for the island include: "La Parida y su Figulo", "La Parida y su Hijos", "Laurence Key", "Little Soldier Key", "Oswald Island" and "Parida".

Current charts show a single key at this location, but many early maps & charts show at least two.

In 1989/1990 a Fort Lauderdale Entertainment conglomerate unveiled plans to partner with a day cruise company and begin selling day trips to Soldier Key. This would have required dredging the bay bottom, creating an artificial beach, building tiki huts and concession stands, electrifying and plumbing the island. A group of locals began a grassroots protest, collecting hundreds of signatures of boycotting customers. They held a regatta protest in which twenty or so boats showed up. This was the day the ground war started in the first Gulf War, so their protest action was lost in the news out of Iraq. They ultimately prevailed and the plans for developing Soldier Key were abandoned.
