= Jones Family Historic District =

Historic district in Florida, United States

- U.S. National Register of Historic Places
- U.S. Historic district
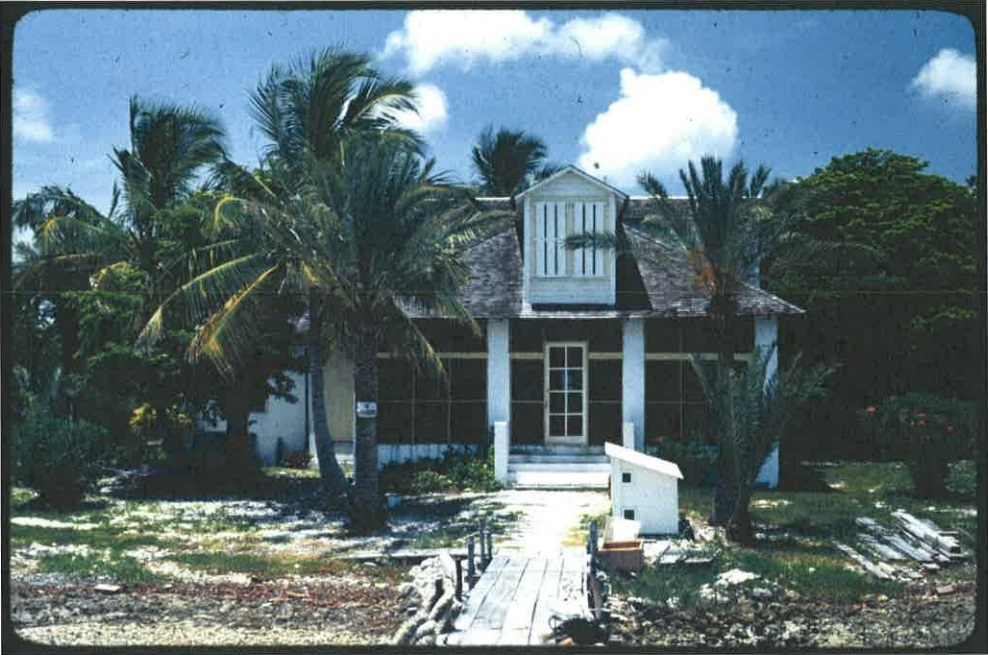
- Jones House, 1970

- Location within Florida Location within the United States
- Location: Islandia, Florida
- Coordinates: 25°22′36.88″N 80°12′29.02″W
- NRHP reference No.: 13000846
- Added to NRHP: October 23, 2013

Jones Family Historic District is a national historic district located at Islandia, Florida in the Biscayne National Park. It includes the homesite and the agricultural structures on Porgy Key and Totten Key.

It was added to the National Register of Historic Places in 2014.
