= Sweeting Homestead =

- U.S. National Register of Historic Places
- Location within Florida Location within the United States
- Nearest city: Biscayne National Park
- Coordinates: 25°27′6.7422″N 80°11′27.8988″W
- Built: 1882
- NRHP reference No.: 97001088
- Added to NRHP: September 19, 1997

The Sweeting Homestead (also known as the Sweeting Plantation) is a historic site in Elliott Key (Biscayne National Park, Florida). On September 19, 1997, it was added to the US National Register of Historic Places.

The story of the Sweeting family, English Bahamian settlers, is central to the Homestead's narrative. Their journey to Elliott Key came through Key West, a bustling maritime hub during the late 19th century. In April 1882, Asa Sweeting, along with his sons George and Thomas, embarked on a journey to Elliott Key, where they filed a homestead claim for 154.4 acres under the provisions of The Homestead Act of 1862.

The Sweeting family's endeavors on Elliott Key primarily revolved around agriculture. They delved into pineapple, key lime, and tomato cultivation, capitalizing on the favorable, frost-free climate of the Florida Keys. Notably, George Sweeting, one of Asa's sons, owned and operated a fleet of schooners, facilitating the transport of their produce to northern markets.

The year 1906 marked a significant turning point for the Sweeting family when a devastating hurricane struck Elliott Key. The hurricane's storm surge inundated the island, causing extensive damage to homes and pineapple plantations. In response, the family shifted their focus to commercial fishing, which offered a stable year-round income source. The challenges posed by the Great Depression prompted many families, including the Sweetings, to leave the island in search of better opportunities on the mainland.

In 1968, Biscayne National Monument was established, encompassing Elliott Key. Later, in 1980, it became Biscayne National Park, preserving the island and the homestead site.

== References and external links ==
- Dade County listings at National Register of Historic Places
