= Juanita Greene =

American journalist

Juanita Greene (1924 - 2017) was an American journalist and conservationist. She worked for the Miami Herald as a reporter and wrote about Everglades National Park and Biscayne National Park. She was the Herald's first environmental reporter.

== Life ==
She was born in Louisiana. She moved to Tampa in 1945. She worked for the Tampa Times. In 1956, she was hired by the Miami Herald. She was a friend of Marjory Stoneman Douglas. She wrote about and testified about the influx of Cuban refugees coming to South Florida. She retired from the Miami Herald in 1978.

She was on the board of Friends of the Everglades. She helped create Biscayne National Park.

She was interviewed for books on National Parks. Greene was featured in the 2009 television documentary miniseries The National Parks: America's Best Idea by acclaimed documentarian Ken Burns.
