= Adams Key =

Island north of the upper Florida Keys in Biscayne National Park

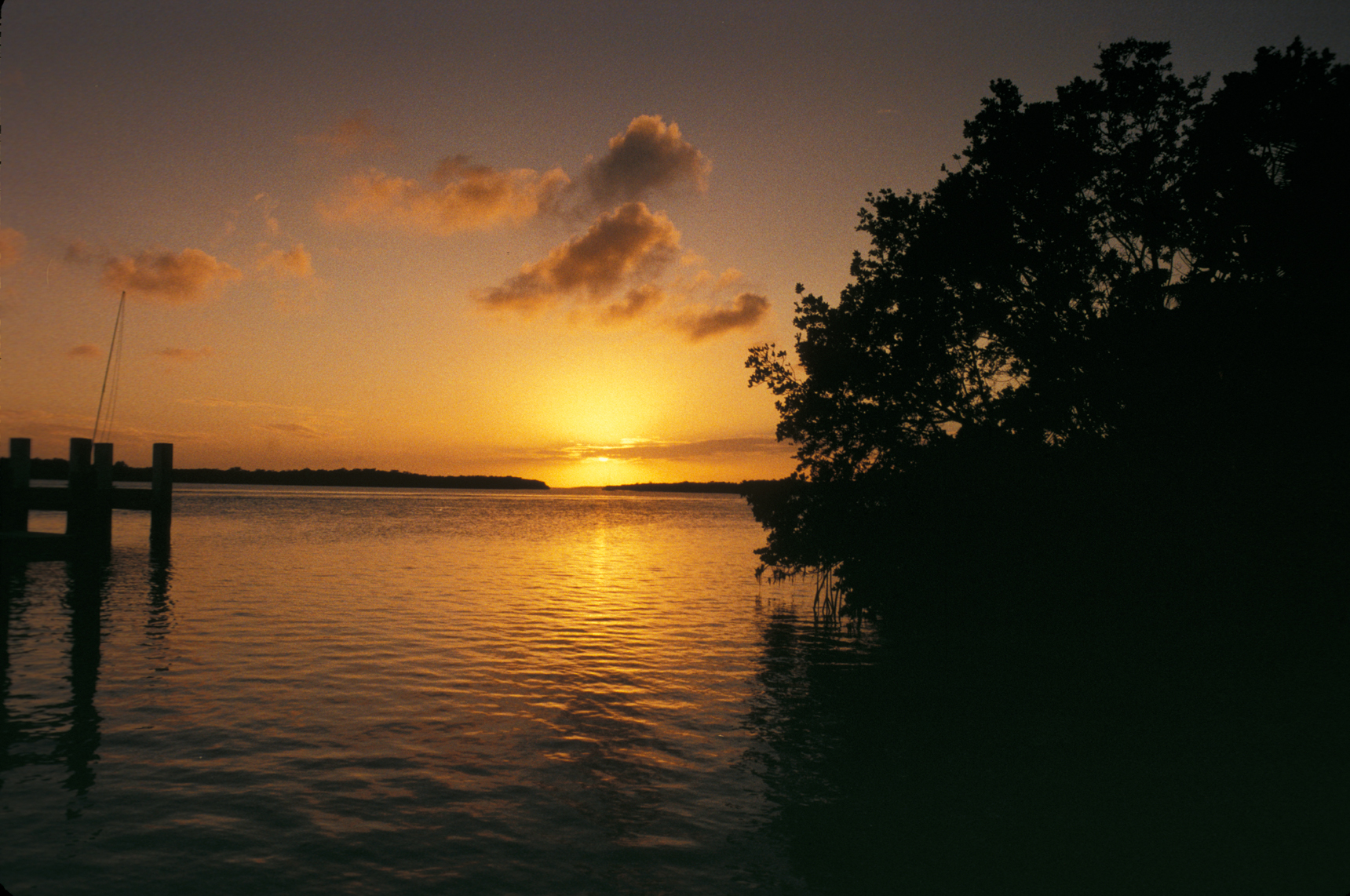
- Sunset at Adams Key in Biscayne National Park

- Adams Key Adams Key (North Atlantic)

Geography
- Location: Atlantic Ocean
- Coordinates: 25.400°N 80.233°W

Administration
- United States
- State: Florida
- County: Miami-Dade

Adams Key is an island at the northern part of the upper Florida Keys in Biscayne National Park. It is in Miami-Dade County, Florida. It is located west of the southern tip of Elliott Key, on the north side of Caesar Creek in the lower part of Biscayne Bay. The key is only accessible by boat, and overnight docking is prohibited.

== History ==
The earlier name for this island was Cocolobo Key. It was the site of the Cocolobo Cay Club, a private resort. Everything on the island, including the still-standing buildings of the club, was destroyed in 1992 when Hurricane Andrew passed almost directly over Adams Key.

It was named Adams' Key on U.S. Coast & Geodetic Survey of 1862.

According to the local legends, the island served as a base for "Black Caesar", a pirate.
