= Sands Key =

Island north of the upper Florida Keys in Biscayne National Park

- Sands Key Sands Key (North Atlantic)

Geography
- Location: Atlantic Ocean
- Coordinates: 25.500073°N 80.183415°W

Administration
- United States
- State: Florida
- County: Miami-Dade

Sands Key is an island north of the upper Florida Keys in Biscayne National Park. It is in Miami-Dade County, Florida.

It is located in lower Biscayne Bay, between Elliott Key and Boca Chita Key.

== History ==
Earlier names for the island were "Las Tetas", "The Paps", "Pownal Kay", "Pownall Island", "Restinga de Las Tetas" and "Saunder's Key".

"Las Tetas" is Spanish for "breasts". The island was most likely called this due to two hills, perhaps Indian mounds located there. Bahamians referred to the island as "Saunder's Key".
