= Ragged Keys =

Small islands north of the upper Florida Keys

- Ragged Keys Ragged Keys (North Atlantic)

Geography
- Location: Atlantic Ocean
- Coordinates: 25.5352°N 80.1705°W

Administration
- United States
- State: Florida
- County: Miami-Dade

Ragged Keys are small islands north of the upper Florida Keys.

They are located in Biscayne Bay, just north of Sands Key, and are part of Biscayne National Park.

Earlier names for these islands were "Knox Island", "Laurence Island", "Los Paradisos", "Mascaras", "Mucaras", "Mucasas", "Pollock Island" and "Soldiers Island".

== History ==
Bernard Romans, who visited these keys in 1774, wrote that these were "Seven rocks called Mascaras", which he said had been "Ill copied on English charts as Mucares".

The northernmost of the Ragged Keys, sometimes referred to as Ragged Key #1 was previously inhabited. There are rotted remains of an old wooden dock and a deteriorated concrete wall which encircles much of the island. Concrete pillars and another concrete structure sometimes described as a 'cistern' can also be found on the island.
