= Biscayne National Park =

U.S. national park in South Florida

- IUCN category II (national park)
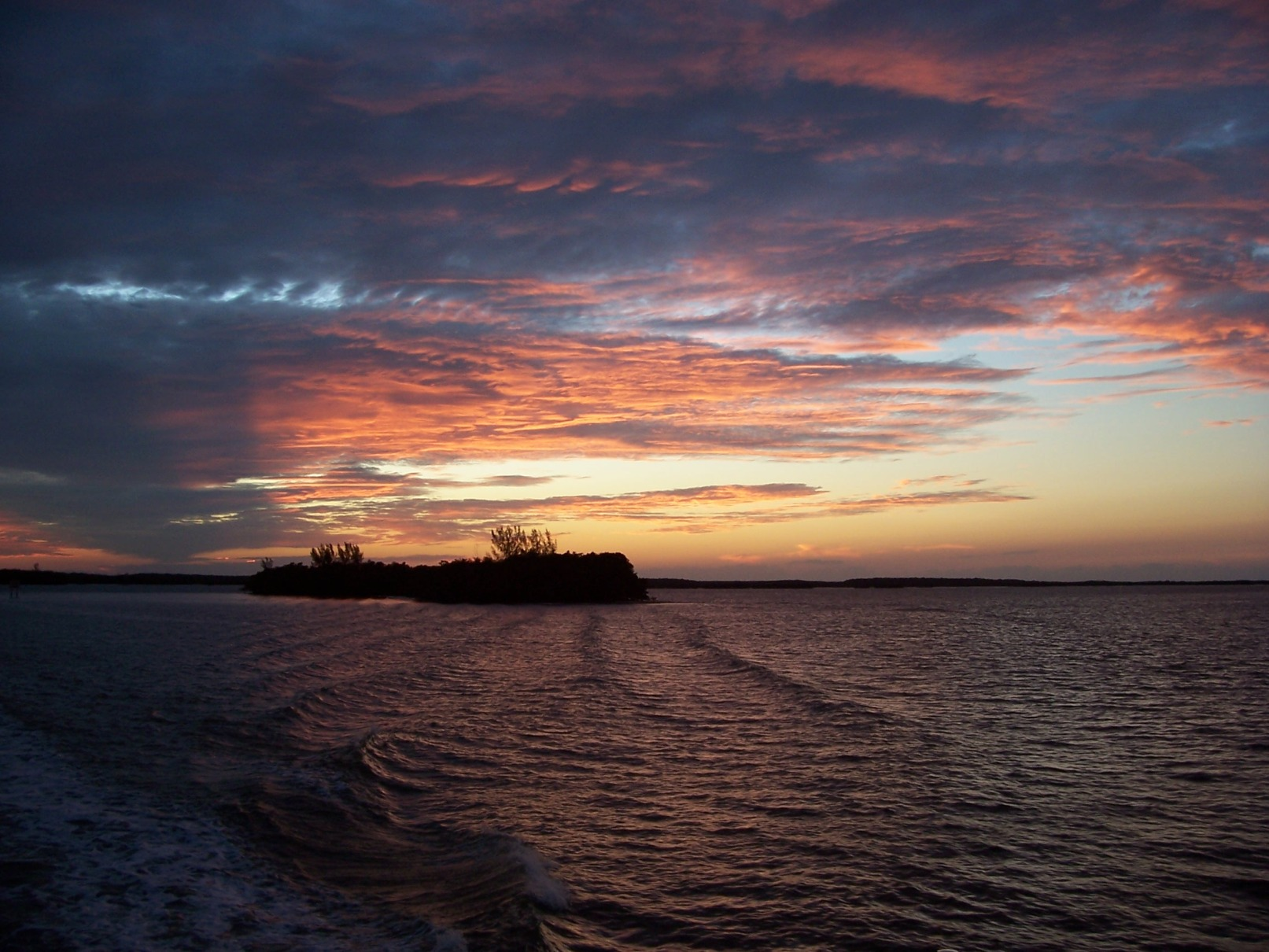
- Sunset at Biscayne National Park in December 2005

- Location within Florida Location within the United States
- Interactive map of Biscayne National Park
- Location: Miami-Dade County, Florida, U.S.
- Nearest city: Homestead
- Coordinates: 25°28′10″N 80°11′10″W
- Area: 172,971 acres (699.99 km^{2})
- Established: June 28, 1980
- Visitors: 701,023 (in 2022)
- Governing body: National Park Service
- Website: nps.gov/bisc

Biscayne National Park is a national park of the United States located south of Miami, Florida, in Miami-Dade County. The park preserves Biscayne Bay and its offshore barrier reefs. The shore of the bay is the location of an extensive mangrove forest. The park covers 172,971 acres (69,998.9 ha; 270.3 sq mi; 700.0 km^{2}), of which 9,075 acres (3,673 ha) are on land. It includes Elliott Key, the park's largest island and northernmost of the true Florida Keys, formed from fossilized coral reef. The islands farther north in the park are transitional islands of coral and sand. The offshore portion of the park includes the northernmost region of the Florida Reef, one of the largest coral reefs in the world.

Biscayne National Park protects four distinct ecosystems: part of the Florida mangroves along the shoreline, the shallow waters of Biscayne Bay, the coral limestone keys, and the offshore Florida Reef. The shoreline swamps of the mainland and island margins provide a nursery for larval and juvenile fish, molluscs, and crustaceans. The bay waters harbor immature and adult fish, seagrass beds, sponges, soft corals, and manatees. The keys are covered with tropical vegetation including endangered cacti and palms, and their beaches provide nesting grounds for endangered sea turtles. Offshore reefs and waters harbor more than 200 species of fish, pelagic birds, whales, and hard corals. Sixteen endangered species including Schaus' swallowtail butterflies, smalltooth sawfish, manatees, and green and hawksbill sea turtles may be observed in the park. Biscayne also has a small population of threatened American crocodiles and a few American alligators.

The people of the Glades culture inhabited the Biscayne Bay region as early as 10,000 years ago before rising sea levels filled the bay. The Tequesta people occupied the islands and shoreline from about 4,000 years before the present to the 16th century, when the Spanish took possession of Florida. Reefs claimed ships from Spanish times through the 20th century, with more than 40 documented wrecks within the park's boundaries. While the park's islands were farmed during the 19th and early 20th centuries, their rocky soil and periodic hurricanes made agriculture difficult to sustain.

In the early 20th century the islands became secluded destinations for wealthy Miamians who built getaway homes and social clubs. Mark C. Honeywell's guesthouse on Boca Chita Key that featured a mock lighthouse was the area's most elaborate private retreat. The Cocolobo Cay Club was at various times owned by Miami developer Carl G. Fisher, yachtsman Garfield Wood, and President Richard Nixon's friend Bebe Rebozo, and was visited by four United States presidents. In 1972, Rebozo encouraged Richard Nixon to fire then-National Park Service director George Hartzog in retaliation for receiving "a ticket from a park ranger in Biscayne National Park for tying his boat illegally to an NPS administrative dock there." Nixon fired Hartzog in December 1972, despite attempts by Secretary of the Interior Rogers Morton to talk the president out of his decision. Nixon opted to replace Hartzog with his office's head of travel arrangement Ron Walker, an "unqualified appointment" who openly admitted "that he did not know the difference between the National Park Service and the Boy Scouts." Rebozo's influence on Nixon's firing of Hartzog has also been noted in Dr. Gil Lusk's 2019 book National Parks: Our Living National Treasures and A Conservative Environmentalist: The Life and Career of Frank Masland Jr. Former National Park Service director Jonathan B. Jarvis has credited Rebozo with indirectly bringing about an overly-politicized era of the Parks program administration that still exists to the present, wherein NPS directors are expected to resign with the election of each new president.

The amphibious community of Stiltsville, established in the 1930s in the shoals of northern Biscayne Bay, took advantage of its remoteness from land to offer offshore gambling and alcohol during Prohibition. After the Cuban Revolution of 1959, the Central Intelligence Agency and Cuban exile groups used Elliott Key as a training ground for infiltrators into Fidel Castro's Cuba.

Originally proposed for inclusion in Everglades National Park, Biscayne Bay was removed from the proposed park to ensure Everglades' establishment. The area remained undeveloped until the 1960s, when a series of proposals were made to develop the keys in the manner of Miami Beach, and to construct a deepwater seaport for bulk cargo, along with refinery and petrochemical facilities on the mainland shore of Biscayne Bay. Through the 1960s and 1970s, two fossil-fueled power plants and two nuclear power plants were built on the bay shores. A backlash against development led to the 1968 designation of Biscayne National Monument. The preserved area was expanded by its 1980 re-designation as Biscayne National Park. The park is heavily used by boaters, and apart from the park's visitor center on the mainland and a jetty at Black Point Marina, its land and sea areas are accessible only by boat.

== Geography ==
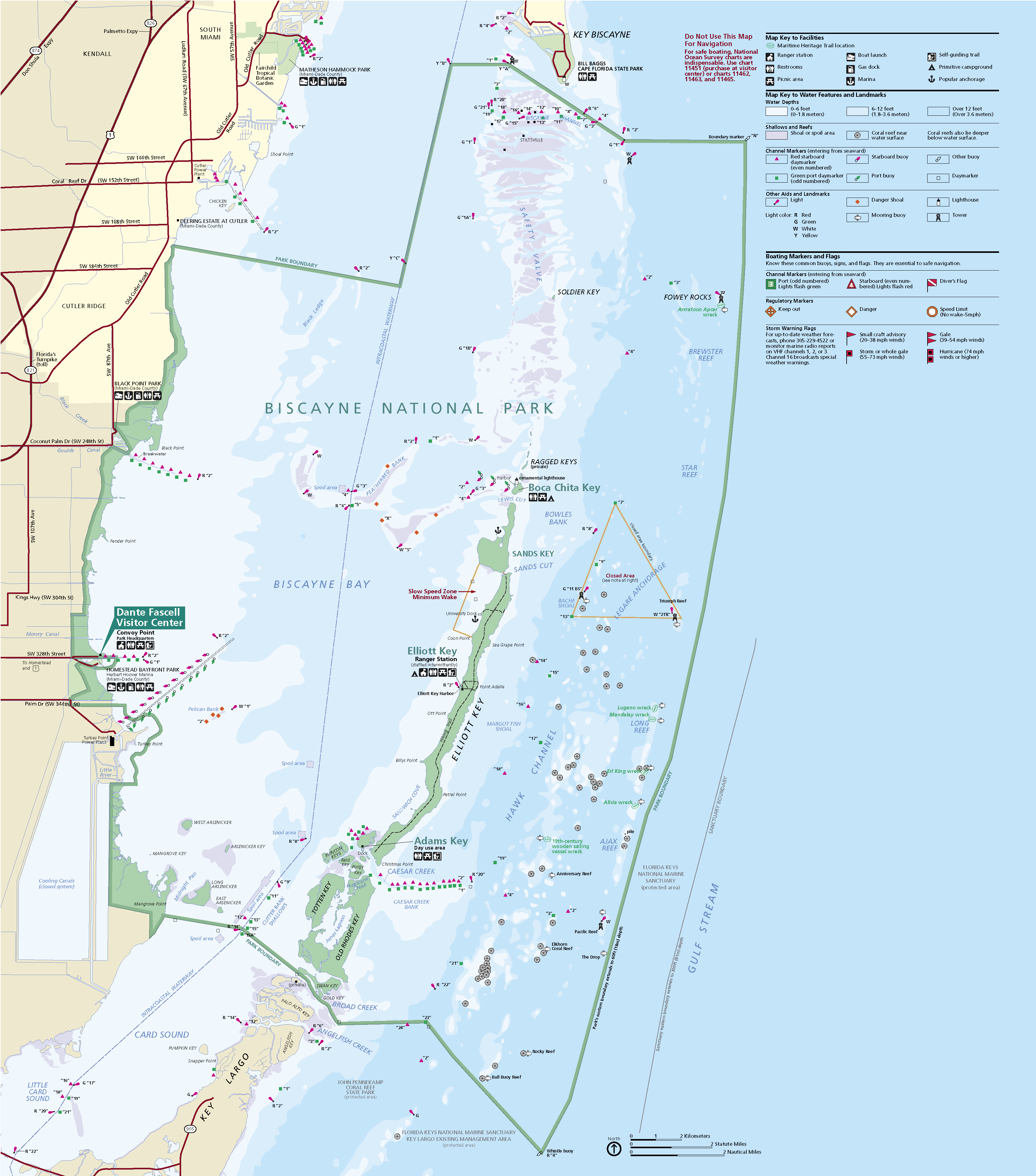
Map of Biscayne National Park

Biscayne National Park comprises 172,971 acres (270.267 sq mi; 699.99 km^{2}) in Miami-Dade County in southeast Florida. Extending from just south of Key Biscayne southward to just north of Key Largo, most of the park is open water, although there are 42 islands within the park boundaries including Soldier Key, the Ragged Keys, Sands Key, Elliott Key, Totten Key and Old Rhodes Key, as well as smaller islands that form the northernmost extension of the Florida Keys. The Safety Valve, a wide shallow opening in the island chain, between the Ragged Keys and Key Biscayne just north of the park's boundary, allows storm surge water to flow out of the bay after the passage of tropical storms. The park's eastern boundary is the ten-fathom line (60-foot; 18 m) of water depth in the Atlantic Ocean on the Florida Reef. The park's western boundary is a fringe of property on the mainland, extending a few hundred meters inland between Cutler Ridge and Mangrove Point. The only direct mainland access to the park is at the Convoy Point Visitor Center, adjacent to the park headquarters. The southwestern boundary adjoins the Turkey Point Nuclear Generating Station and its system of cooling canals.

The southern portion of Biscayne Bay extends between Elliott Key and the mainland, transited by the Intracoastal Waterway. The park abuts the Florida Keys National Marine Sanctuary on the east and south sides of the park and John Pennekamp Coral Reef State Park to the south. Only 9,075 acres (36.73 km^{2}; 14.180 sq mi) of the park's area are on land, with the offshore keys comprising 4,250 acres (17.2 km^{2}; 6.64 sq mi) and mainland mangrove swamps account for the remaining 4,825 acres (19.53 km^{2}; 7.539 sq mi). As an extension of the Everglades ecosystem, much of the park was originally proposed to be included in Everglades National Park, but was excluded to obtain a consensus for the establishment of the Everglades park in 1947.

=== Geology ===
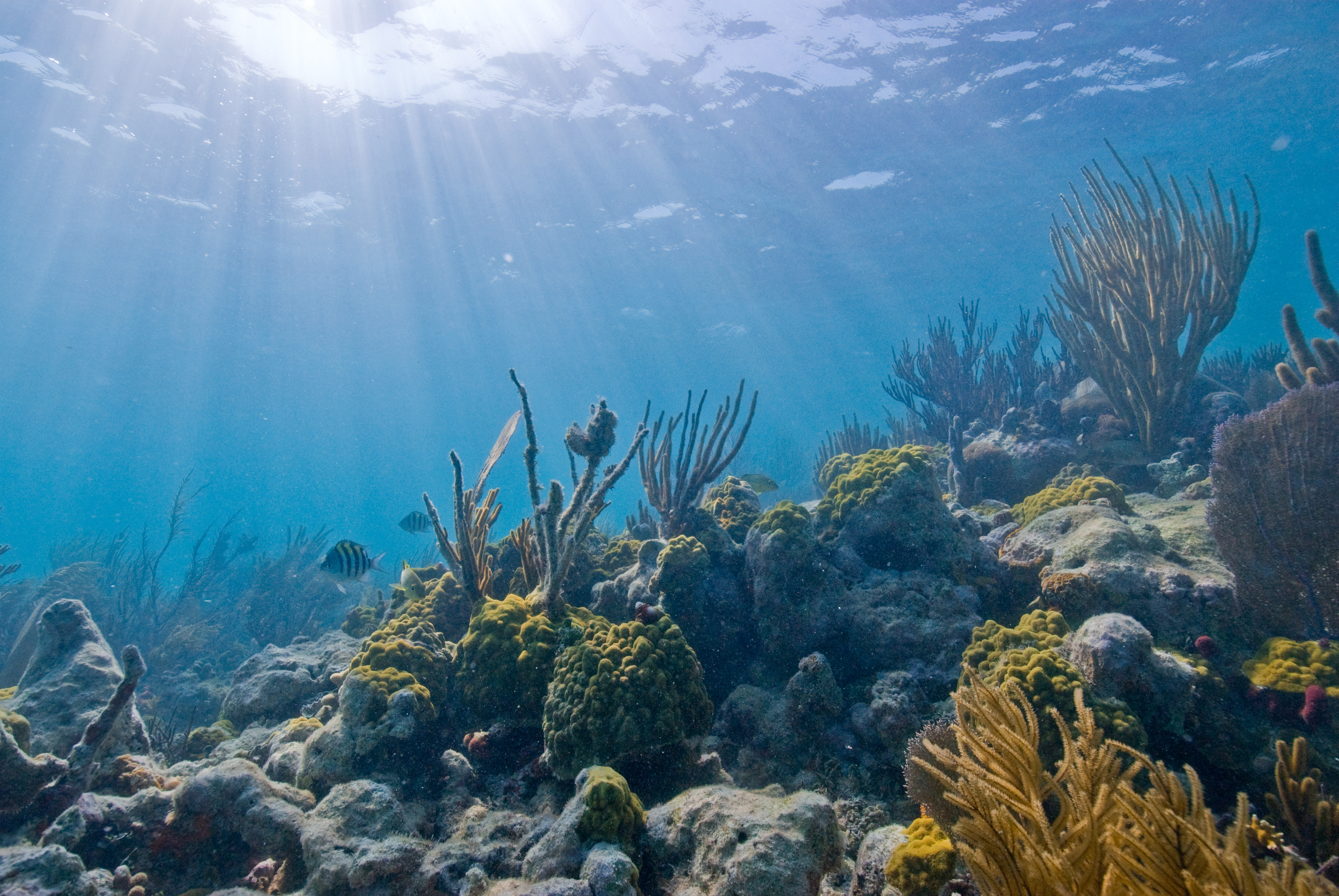
Underwater view of a coral reef at Biscayne National Park

Biscayne Bay marks the southernmost extent of the Atlantic barrier islands, represented by Key Biscayne and the northernmost extent of the Florida Keys at Elliott Key. The keys are distinguished from the barrier islands by the coral limestone that extends to the islands' surface under a thin veneer of topsoil, while the barrier islands are dominated by wave-deposited sands that cover most of the limestones. Biscayne Bay lies between low ridges of oolitic Miami Limestone on the west, forming Cutler Ridge and the coral-based Key Largo limestone that underlies Elliott Key and the keys to the south. The Miami limestone was deposited in turbulent lagoon waters.

The Key Largo Limestone is a fossilized coral reef formed during the Sangamonian Stage of about 75,000 to 125,000 years ago. The Miami Formation achieved its present form somewhat later, during a glacial period in which fresh water consolidated and cemented the lagoon deposits. The Key Largo Limestone is a coarse stone formed from stony corals, between 69 and 200 feet (21 and 61 m) in thickness. As a consequence of their origins as reefs, the beaches of Elliott Key and Old Rhodes Key are rocky. Significant sandy beaches are found only at Sands Key.

=== Hydrology ===
Biscayne Bay is a shallow semi-enclosed lagoon which averages 10 ft (3.0 m) in depth. Both its mainland margins and the keys are covered by mangrove forest. The park includes the southern portion of Biscayne Bay, with areas of thin sediment called "hardbottom", and vegetated seagrass meadows supporting turtlegrass and shoal grass.

As a result of efforts to control water resources in Florida and projects to drain the Everglades during the early and mid-20th century, water flow into Biscayne Bay has been altered by the construction of canals. These canals channel water from portions of the southeastern Everglades now used for agriculture into the bay. Prior to canal construction, most fresh water inflow came from rain and groundwater, but the canals are now altering the salinity profile of the bay, conveying sediment and pollutants and leading to saltwater intrusion into the Biscayne aquifer. The Comprehensive Everglades Restoration Plan (CERP) was established in 2000 to mitigate the effects of human intervention into the natural water flow of the Everglades. Primarily aimed at the restoration of historical patterns of water flow into Everglades National Park, the project will also deal with issues arising from the diversion of water out of the southern Everglades into Biscayne Bay. The Biscayne Bay Coastal Wetlands Project (BBCW) is a CERP component specifically intended to redistribute water flow so that fresh water is introduced gradually through creeks and marshes rather than short, heavy discharges through drainage canals.

== Human history ==
=== Native people ===
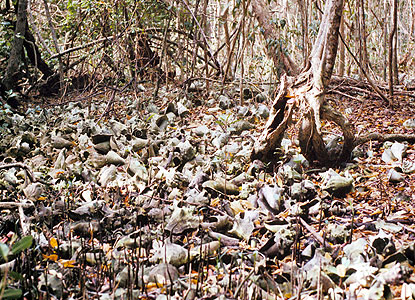
Piles of conch and whelk shells left behind by Native Americans.

Native Americans were present in lower Florida 10,000 years ago, when ocean levels were low and Biscayne Bay was comparatively empty of water. Water levels rose from about 4000 years ago and inundated the bay. Archeologists believe any traces left by the peoples of that era are now submerged; none now exist on dry lands in the park. The Cutler Fossil Site, just to the west of the park, has yielded evidence of human occupation extending to at least 10000 years before the present.

The earliest evidence of human presence in Biscayne dates to about 2500 years before the present, with piles of conch and whelk shells left by the Glades culture. The Glades culture was followed by the Tequesta people, who occupied the shores of Biscayne Bay. The Tequesta were a sedentary community that lived on fish and other sea life, with no significant agricultural activity. A site on Sands Key has yielded potsherds, worked shells and other artifacts indicating occupation from at latest 1000 CE to about 1650, after contact was made with Europeans. Fifty significant archaeological sites have been identified in the park.

=== Exploration ===
Juan Ponce de León explored the area in 1513, discovering the Florida Keys and encountering the Tequesta on the mainland. Other Spanish explorers arrived later in the 16th century and Florida came under Spanish rule. The Tequesta were resettled by the then-Spanish government in the Florida Keys, and the South Florida mainland was depopulated. Ponce de León referred to the bay as "Chequescha" after its inhabitants, becoming "Tequesta" by the time of Spanish governor Pedro Menéndez de Avilés later in the century. The present name has been attributed to a shipwrecked Basque sailor known as the "Biscaino" or "Viscayno" who lived in the area for a time, or to a more general allusion to the Bay of Biscay.

Spanish treasure fleets regularly sailed past the Florida Keys and were often caught in hurricanes. There are 44 documented shipwrecks in the park from the 16th through the 20th centuries. At least two 18th-century Spanish ships were wrecked in the park area. The Spanish galleon Nuestra Senora del Popolo is believed to have been wrecked in park waters in 1733, though the site has not been found. HMS Fowey was wrecked in 1748 in what is now Legare Anchorage, at some distance from the Fowey Rocks. The discovery of the ship in 1975 resulted in a landmark court case that established the wreck as an archaeological site rather than a salvage site. 43 wrecks are included on the National Register of Historic Places in the Offshore Reefs Archeological District, which extends for 30 mi (48 km) along the seaward side of the Biscayne National Park keys. During the 18th century, Elliott Key was the reputed base of two different pirates, both called Black Caesar, commemorated by Caesar's Creek between Elliott and Old Rhodes Key.

=== Settlement and pre-park use ===
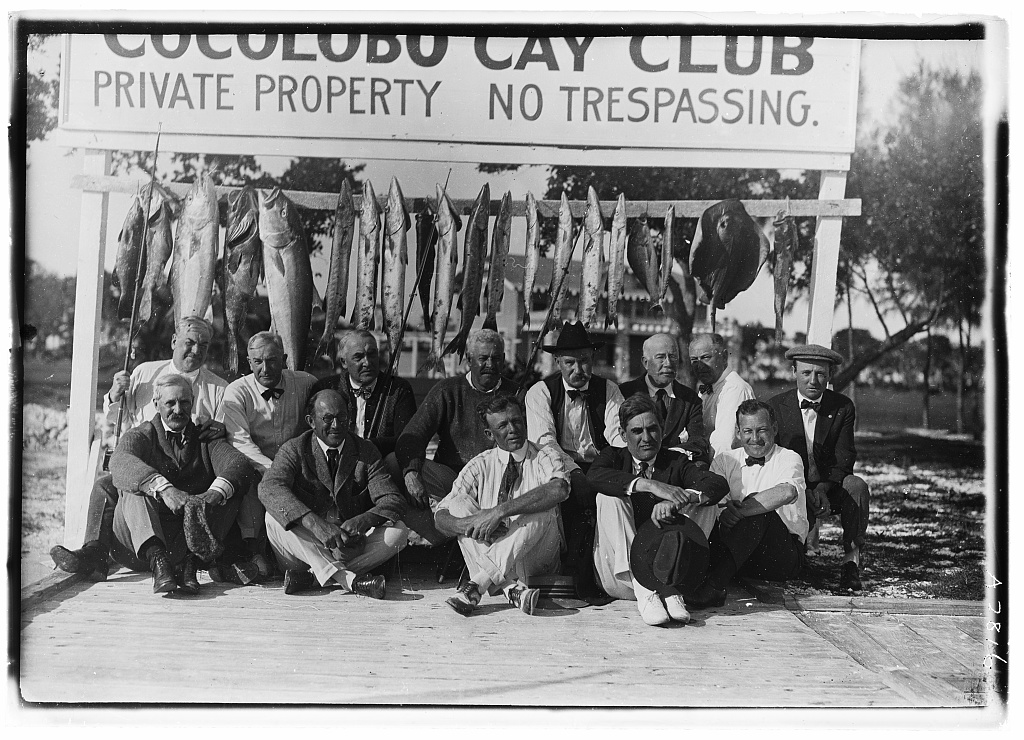
U.S. President Warren G. Harding and fishing party at the Cocolobo Cay Club.

The first permanent European settlers in the Miami area did not come until the early 19th century. The first settlements around Biscayne Bay were small farms on Elliott Key growing crops like key limes and pineapples. John James Audubon visited Elliott Key in 1832. Colonel Robert E. Lee surveyed the area around Biscayne Bay for potential fortification sites in 1849. At the end of the American Civil War in 1865, a number of Confederates passed through the area as they were attempting to escape to Cuba. Elliott Key was a brief stopping point for John C. Breckinridge during his flight to Cuba. The former United States vice president, Confederate general and Confederate secretary of war spent two nights in Biscayne Bay on his journey. Few people lived in the park area until 1897, when Israel Lafayette Jones, an African-American property manager, bought Porgy Key for US$300 (equivalent to $11,600 in 2025). The next year Jones bought the adjoining Old Rhodes Key and grew limes and pineapples there.

In 1911, Jones bought 212-acre (86 ha) Totten Key, which had been used as a pineapple plantation, for a dollar an acre, selling in 1925 for US$250,000. Before Israel Jones' death in 1932 the Jones plantations were for a while among the largest lime producers on the Florida east coast.

Carl G. Fisher, who was responsible for much of the development of Miami Beach, bought Adams Key, once known as Cocolobo Key, in 1916 and built the Cocolobo Cay Club in 1922. The two-story club building had ten guest rooms, a dining room, and a separate recreation lodge. Patrons included Warren G. Harding, Albert Fall, T. Coleman du Pont, Harvey Firestone, Jack Dempsey, Charles F. Kettering, Will Rogers and Frank Seiberling. Israel Jones' sons Lancelot and Arthur dropped out of the lime-growing business after competition from Mexican limes made their business less profitable, and after a series of devastating hurricanes in 1938 they became full-time fishing guides at the Cocolobo Club. The club had declined with the crash of 1929 which cost Fisher his fortune, but was revived by Garfield Wood in 1934. Among the Joneses' clients was avid fisherman Herbert Hoover and his family. The Joneses also provided the club with fish, lobster and crabs. Arthur and Lancelot Jones were the second largest landowners and the only permanent residents of the lower Biscayne Bay keys during the 1960s. Wood sold the Cocolobo Cay Club to a group of investors led by Miami banker Bebe Rebozo in 1954, who renamed it the Coco Lobo Fishing Club. Clients guided by the Joneses through the 1940s and 1950s included then-senators John F. Kennedy, Lyndon Johnson, Richard Nixon, Herman Talmadge, and George Smathers.

During the Cold War the future park area was a training ground for Cuban exiles training for missions in Fidel Castro's Cuba. Elliott Key in particular was used by the Central Intelligence Agency as a training area in the early 1960s in preparation for Bay of Pigs invasion. The largest facility was Ledbury Lodge, the only hotel ever built on the key. As late as 1988 a group of Cuban exiles were arrested when they tried to use the key for a mock landing. Farther north, exiled Venezuelan president Marcos Pérez Jiménez kept a house on Soldier Key until he was extradited in 1963.

=== Proposed development ===
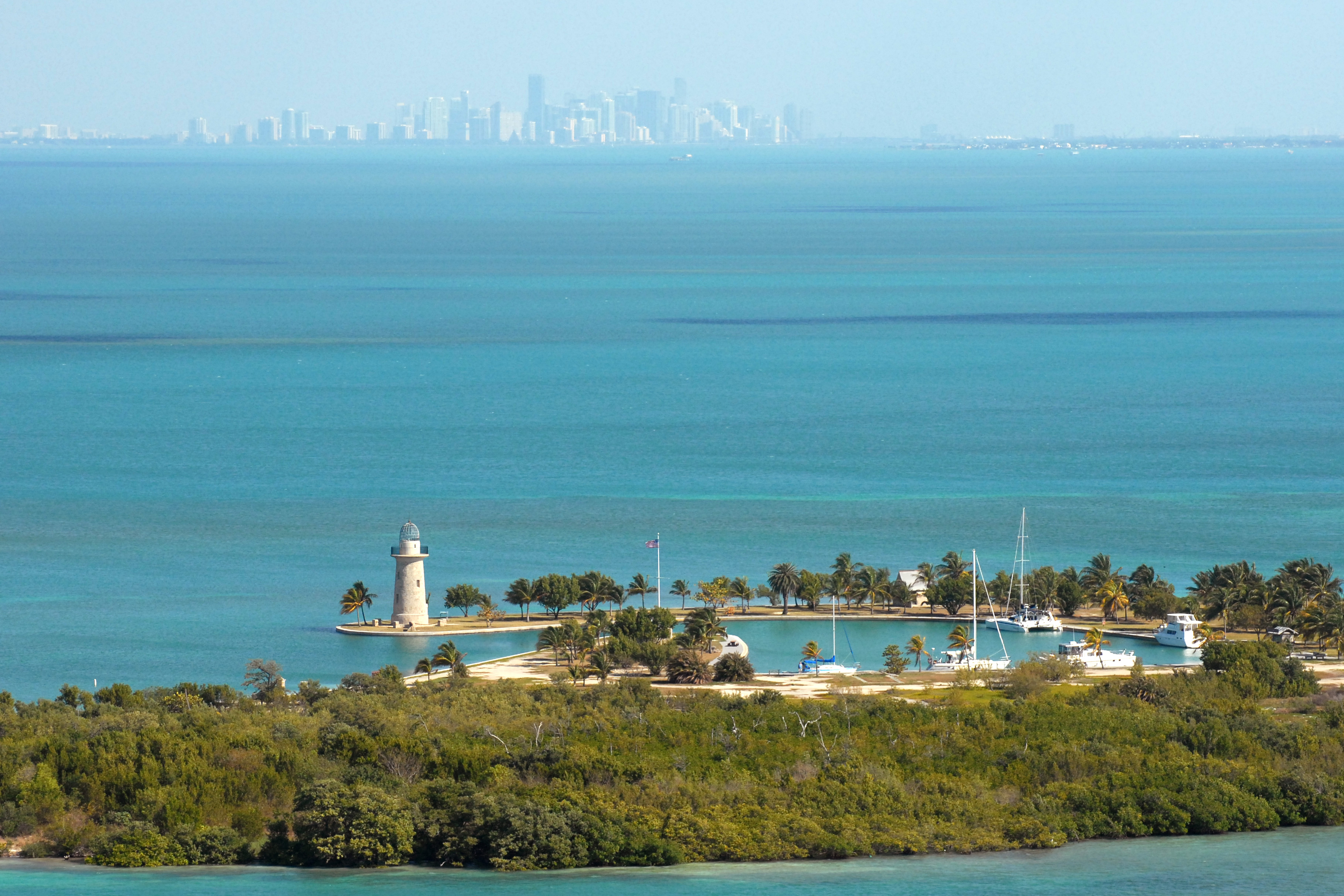
Boca Chita Key lighthouse and the Miami skyline

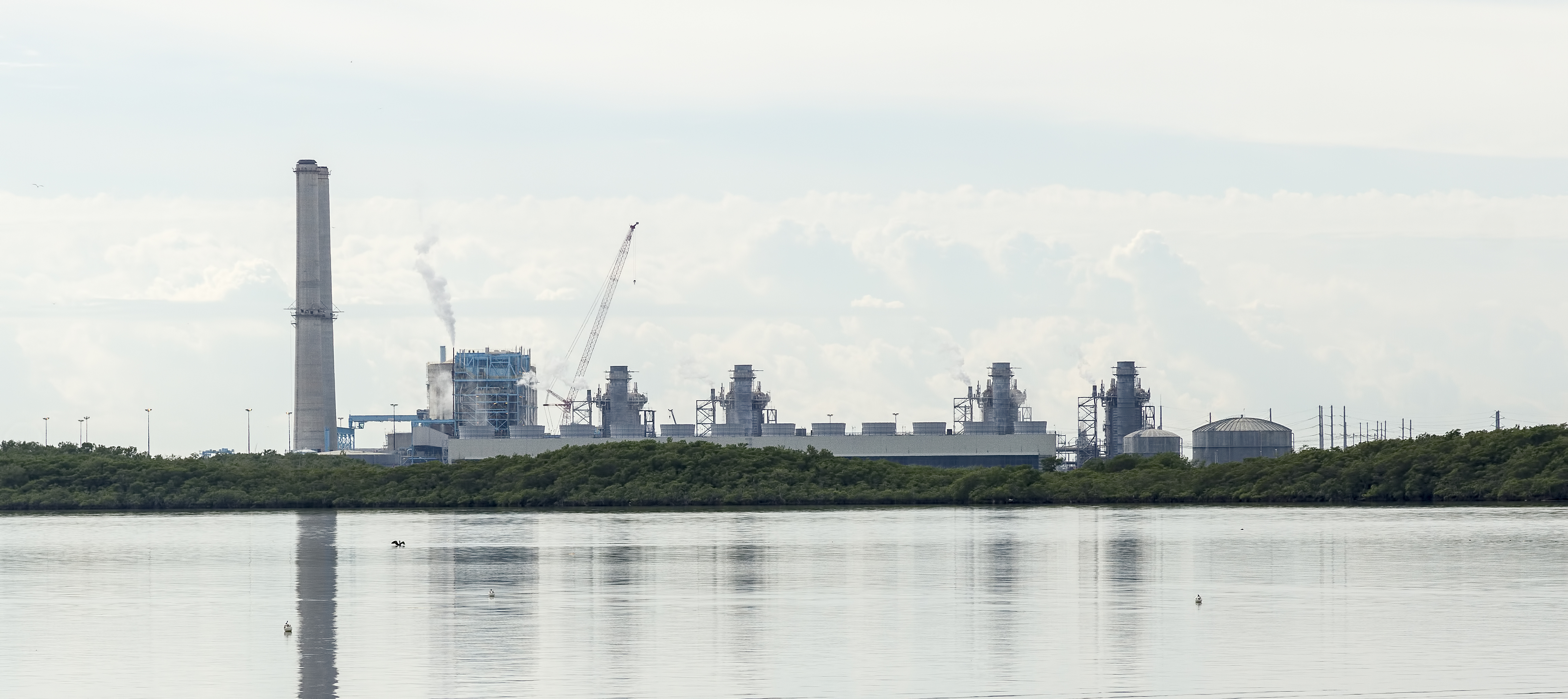
Turkey Point Power Station

As modern communities grew in and around Miami, developers looked to southern Miami-Dade County for new projects. The undeveloped keys south of Key Biscayne were viewed as prime development territory.

Beginning in the 1890s, local interests promoted the construction of a causeway to the mainland. One proposal included building a highway linking the Biscayne Bay keys to the Overseas Highway at Key Largo and to the developed barrier islands to the north. At the same time, pressure built to accommodate industrial development in South Florida. This led to competing priorities between those who wanted to develop for residential and leisure use and those in favor of industrial and infrastructure development. On December 6, 1960, 12 of the 18 area landowners who favored development voted to create the City of Islandia on Elliott Key. The town was incorporated to encourage Dade County to improve access to Elliott Key, which landowners viewed as a potential rival to Miami Beach. The new city lobbied for causeway access and formed a negotiating bloc to attract potential developers.

In 1962, an industrial seaport was proposed for the mainland shores of Biscayne Bay, to be known as SeaDade. SeaDade, supported by billionaire shipping magnate Daniel K. Ludwig, would have included an oil refinery. In addition to the physical structures, it would have been necessary to dredge a 40-foot-deep (12 m) channel through the bay for large ships to access the refinery. The channel would have also required cutting through the coral reef to get to the deep water. In 1963 Florida Power and Light (FP&L) announced plans for two new 400-megawatt oil-fired power plants on undeveloped land at Turkey Point.

Many local residents and politicians supported SeaDade because it would have created additional jobs, but a group of early environmentalists thought the costs were too high. They fought against development of the bay and formed the Safe Progress Association. Led by Lloyd Miller, the president of the local chapter of the Izaak Walton League, Miami Herald reporter Juanita Greene, and Art Marshall, the opponents of industrialization proposed the creation of a national park unit that would protect the reefs, islands and bay. After initial skepticism, the park proposal obtained the support of Miami Herald editors, as well as Florida Congressman Dante Fascell and Florida Governor Claude R. Kirk Jr., and were supported by lobbying efforts by sympathetic businessmen including Herbert Hoover, Jr.

One vision of Islandia, supported by land owners, would have connected the northern Florida Keys from Key Biscayne to Key Largo, with bridges and created new islands using the fill from the SeaDade channel. Although Miami-area politicians and the state of Florida did not support Ludwig's SeaDade plans, Islandia's supporters continued to lobby for development support. In 1968, when it appeared the area was about to become a national monument, Islandia supporters bulldozed a highway six lanes wide down the center of the island, destroying the forest for 7 miles (11 km). Islandia landowners called it Elliott Key Boulevard, but called it "Spite Highway" privately. It was hoped that since there was so much environmental damage, no one would want it for a national monument. Over time in the near-tropical climate, the forest grew back and now the only significant hiking trail on Elliott Key now follows the path of Elliott Key Boulevard.

The oil-fired Turkey Point power stations were completed in 1967–68 and experienced immediate problems from the discharge of hot cooling water into Biscayne Bay, where the heat killed marine grasses. In 1964 FP&L announced plans for two 693 MW nuclear reactors at the site, which were expected to compound the cooling water problem. Because of the shallowness of Biscayne Bay, the power stations were projected to consume a significant proportion of the bay's waters each day for cooling. After extensive negotiations and litigation with both the state and with Ludwig, who owned lands needed for cooling water canals, a closed-loop canal system was built south of the power plants and the nuclear units became operational in the early 1970s.

Portions of the present park were used for recreation prior to the park's establishment. Homestead Bayfront Park, still operated by Miami-Dade County just south of Convoy Point, established a "blacks-only" segregated beach for African-Americans at the present site of the Dante Fascell Visitor Center. The segregated beach operated through the 1950s into the early 1960s before segregated public facilities were abolished.

=== Park establishment and history ===
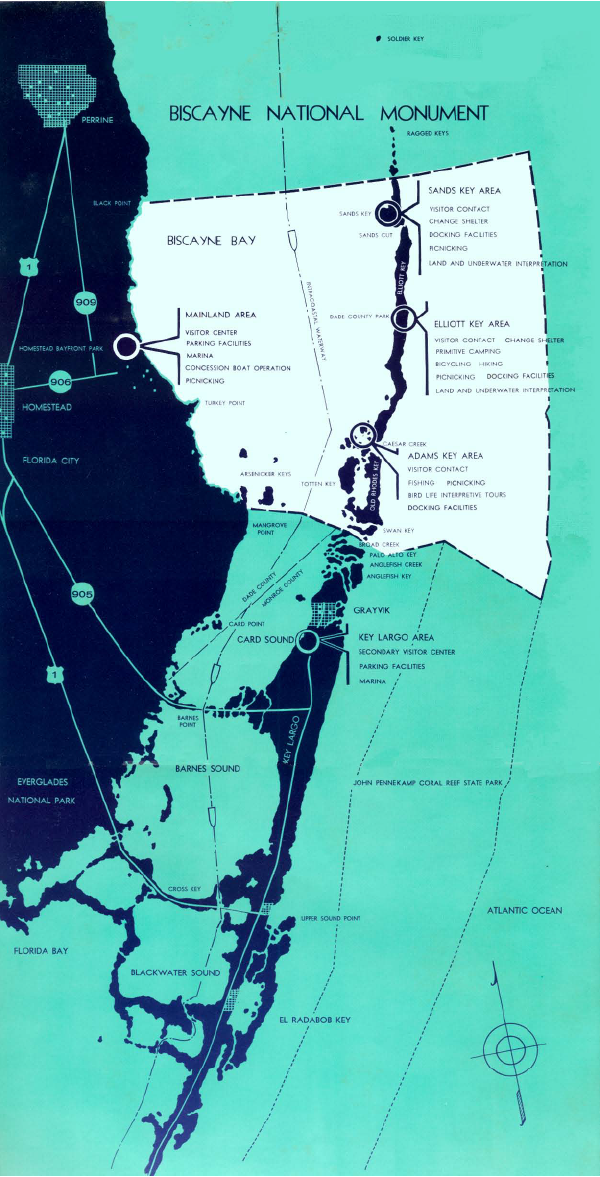
Biscayne National Monument as proposed in 1966

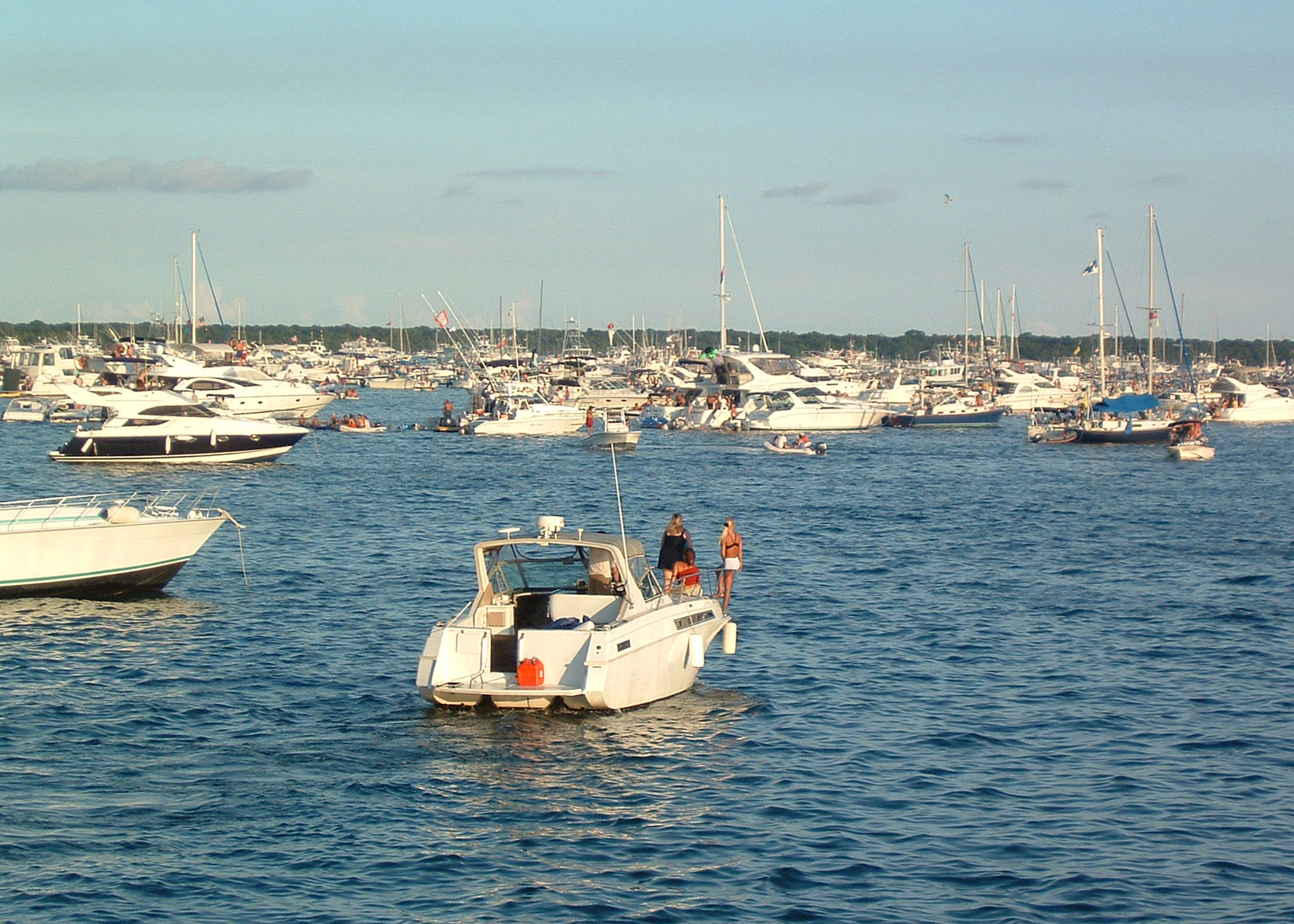
Columbus Day boating crowd

The earliest proposals for the protection of Biscayne Bay were part of proposals by Everglades National Park advocate Ernest F. Coe, whose proposed Everglades park boundaries included Biscayne Bay, its keys, interior country including what are now Homestead and Florida City, and Key Largo. Biscayne Bay, Key Largo and the adjoining inland extensions were cut from Everglades National Park before its establishment in 1947. When proposals to develop Elliott Key surfaced in 1960, Lloyd Miller asked Secretary of the Interior Stewart Udall to send a Park Service reconnaissance team to review the Biscayne Bay area for inclusion in the national park system. A favorable report ensued, and with financial help from Herbert Hoover, Jr., political support was solicited, most notably from Congressman Fascell. A 90-acre (36 ha) area of Elliott Key was by this time a part of the Dade County park system. The 1966 report noted the proposed park contained the best remaining areas of tropical forest in Florida and a rare combination of "terrestrial, marine and amphibious life", as well as significant recreational value. The report found the most significant virtues of the potential park were "the clear, sparkling waters, marine life, and the submerged lands of Biscayne Bay and the Atlantic Ocean. Here in shallow water is a veritable wonderland."

President Lyndon B. Johnson signed Public Law 90–606 to create Biscayne National Monument on October 18, 1968. The monument was expanded in 1974 under Public Law 93-477 and expanded again when the monument was redesignated a national park by an act of Congress through Public Law 96-287, effective June 28, 1980. The 1980 expansion extended the park almost to Key Biscayne and included Boca Chita Key, the Ragged Keys and the Safety Valve shoal region, together with the corresponding offshore reefs and a substantial portion of central Biscayne Bay.

The first Islandia property owner to sell land to the National Park Service was Lancelot Jones, together with Katherine Jones, Arthur's widow. They sold their lands for $1,272,500, about a third of the potential development value. Jones was given a life estate on 3 acres (1.2 ha) at the age of 70. He visited with park rangers stationed at the former Cocolobo Club, which eventually burned down in 1975. The other life estate in the park was held by Virginia Tannehill, the widow of Eastern Airlines executive Paul Tannehill. Jones' house built by Lancelot, his father and his brother, burned down in 1982. He lived in a two-room shack for the next ten years, riding out hurricanes on Porgy Key, but left his home permanently just before Hurricane Andrew in 1992. The house was destroyed and Jones remained in Miami until his death in 1997 at 99 years.

Deprived of a rationale for existence by the national monument's establishment, Islandia languished. The hiring of a police chief in 1989 prompted questions from the National Park Service to the Dade County state attorney's office, headed by Janet Reno. In 1990 Reno's office determined after investigation that all of the town's elections were invalid, since the elections were restricted only to landowners, not residents. The town was finally abolished by the Miami-Dade Board of County Commissioners in March 2012.

The impact of Hurricane Andrew on neighboring Homestead Air Force Base caused the Air Force to consider closing the base and conveying it to Miami-Dade County, which was interested in using the base for commercial air traffic as an alternative to Miami International Airport. An environmental impact study concluded the resulting flight paths over the bay, only 2 mi (3.2 km) to the east, would result in degradation of the park. In 1999 The Air Force prohibited major commercial development at Homestead as a result.

The park's popularity as a destination for boaters has led to a high rate of accidents, some of them fatal. The Columbus Day weekend has been cited as the "most dangerous weekend of the year". An annual boating regatta in its 57th year in 2012 resulted in six deaths between 2002 and 2011, with damage to seabeds from vessel groundings and littering. Although official regatta activities take place outside the park, the area of Elliott Key has become a popular destination for some participants.

A fifth generating unit fueled by natural gas and oil was added to the Turkey Point generating station in 2007. In 2009, Turkey Point was proposed as the site of two new 1117 MW AP1000 nuclear reactors, to be designated Turkey Point 6 and 7. If built, the new reactors would make Turkey Point one of the largest generating sites in the United States. Other neighboring influences on the bay are the agricultural lands of south Miami-Dade County, a sewage treatment facility on the park boundary at Black Point, and its neighbor, the South Miami-Dade Landfill.

== Activities ==
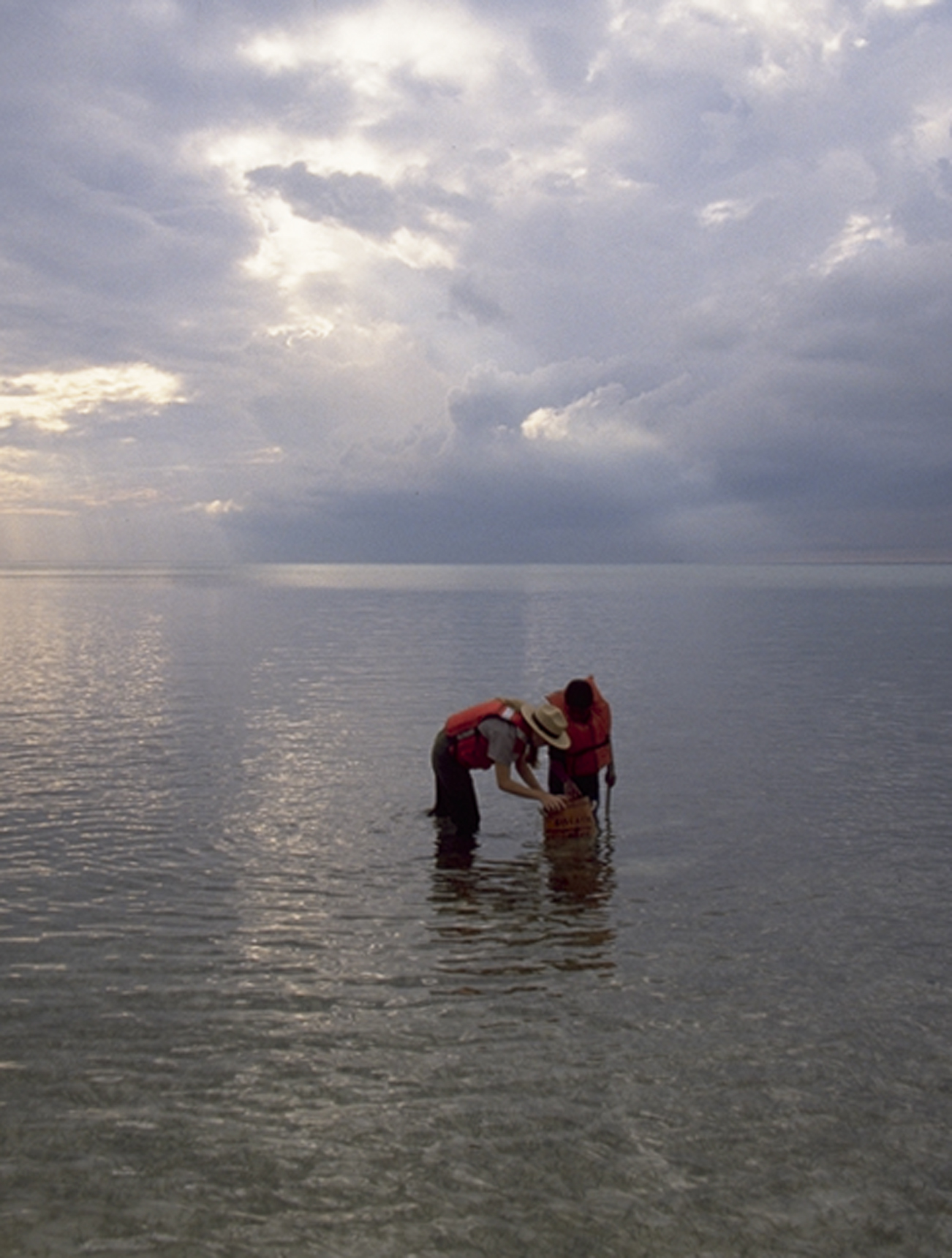
A park ranger shows underwater life to a visitor using a glass-bottomed bucket

Biscayne National Park operates year-round. Camping is most practical in winter months, when mosquitoes are less troublesome on the keys. The Biscayne National Park Institute provides half and full day tours in the park that include snorkeling, hiking, paddling and sailing from the park headquarters. Boat excursions to Boca Chita Key and the area's lighthouses are also available. Licensed private concessionaires provide guided fishing, snorkeling, sailing, and sightseeing tours.

=== Recreation ===
Access to the park from the mainland is limited to the immediate vicinity of the Dante Fascell Visitor Center at Convoy Point. All other portions of the park are reachable only by private or concessioner boats. Activities include boating, fishing, kayaking, windsurfing, snorkeling and scuba diving. Miami-Dade County operates four marina parks near the park. Homestead Bayfront Park is directly adjacent to the park headquarters at Convoy Point. Farther south Black Point Park provides access to Adams and Elliott Keys. Matheson Hammock Park is near the north end of the park, and Crandon Park is on Key Biscayne.

Although it is a federally designated park, fishing within Biscayne is governed by the state of Florida. Anglers in Biscayne are required to have a Florida recreational saltwater fishing license. Fishing is limited to designated sport fish, spiny lobster, stone crab, blue crab and shrimp. Tropical reef fish may not be collected, nor may sharks, conch, sea urchins and other marine life. Reef life species such as coral and sponges are also protected from collecting by visitors. Additionally, lobstering is prohibited in the Biscayne Bay-Card Sound Lobster Sanctuary, administered by the state of Florida to protect spiny lobster breeding areas, which overlaps much of Biscayne Bay.

A private concessioner provides tours from the Park headquarters into the bay and to the keys. Most tours are operated during the peak winter season from January to April. Personal watercraft are prohibited in Biscayne and most other national parks, but other private powerboats and sailboats are permitted.

=== Island facilities ===
Most of Biscayne's permanent facilities are on the offshore keys. A seasonally staffed ranger station is on Elliott Key, as well as a campground and 36 boat slips. A single loop trail runs from the harbor to the oceanfront, and a path following the Spite Highway runs the length of the island. Adams Key is a day-use-only area for visitors, although two Park Service residences are on the island. Boca Chita Key is the most-visited island, with a campground and picnic areas. The Boca Chita Lighthouse is occasionally open to visitors when staffing permits.

=== Snorkeling and diving ===
Snorkeling and scuba diving on the offshore reefs are popular activities. The reefs have been the cause of many shipwrecks. A selection of wrecks have been the subjects of ranger-led snorkeling tours and have been organized as the Maritime Heritage Trail, the only underwater archaeological trail in the National Park Service system. The wrecks of the Arratoon Apcar (sank 1878), Erl King (1891), Alicia (1905), Lugano (1913) and Mandalay (1966) are on the trail together with an unknown wreck from the 1800s and the Fowey Rocks Lighthouse. The Alicia, Erl King and Lugano are relatively deep wrecks, best suited for scuba dives. The Mandalay is at a shallower depth and is especially popular for snorkeling.

== Historical structures ==
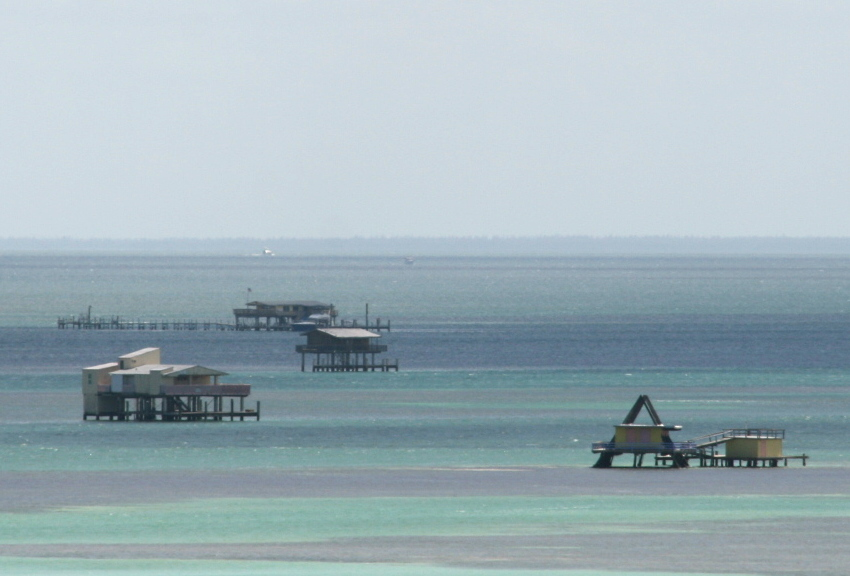
Stiltsville as seen from Cape Florida

Although most of Biscayne National Park's area is water, the islands have a number of protected historical structures and districts. Shipwrecks are also protected within the park, and the park's offshore waters are a protected historic district.

=== Stiltsville ===
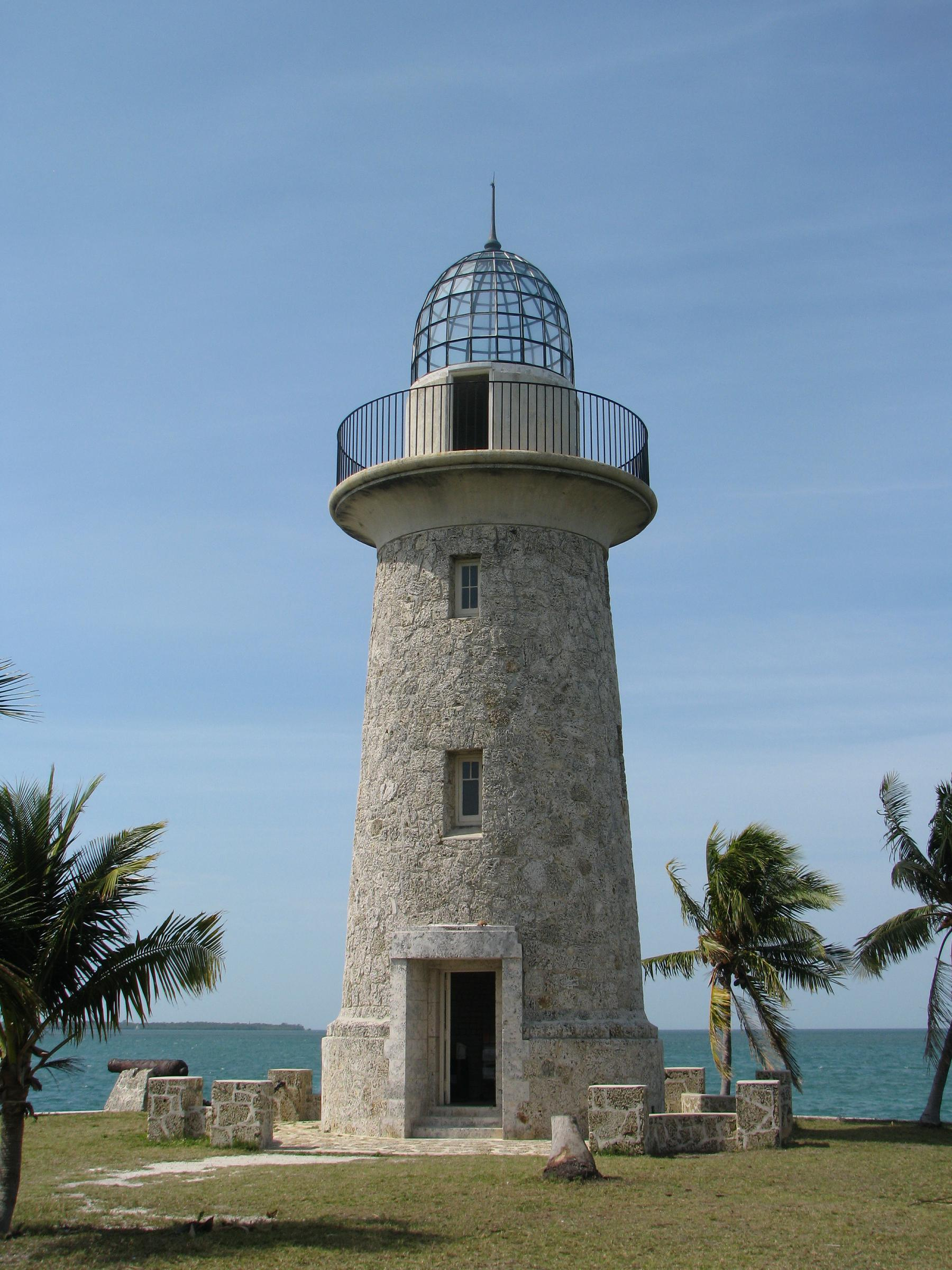
The ornamental lighthouse at Boca Chita Key

Stiltsville was established by Eddie "Crawfish" Walker in the 1930s as a small community of shacks built on pilings in a shallow section of Biscayne Bay, not far from Key Biscayne. Comprising 27 structures at its height in the 1960s, Stiltsville lost shacks to fires and hurricanes, with only six surviving in 2021, none of them dating to the 1960s or earlier. The site was incorporated into Biscayne National Park in 1985, when the Park Service agreed to honor existing leases until July 1, 1999. Hurricane Andrew destroyed most of Stiltsville in 1992. The Park Service has undertaken to preserve the community, which is now unoccupied. The community is to be administered by a trust and used as accommodation for overnight camping, educational facilities and researchers.

=== Other structures ===
Biscayne National Park includes a number of navigational aids, as well as an ornamental structure built to resemble a lighthouse. The Fowey Rocks Light is a skeleton-frame cast iron structure built in 1878. Already included within the boundaries of the park, the light was acquired by the Park Service on October 2, 2012. The unmanned Pacific Reef Light is about three miles (4.8 km) offshore from Elliott Key. The original 1921 structure was replaced in 2000 and its lantern was placed on display in a park in Islamorada.

Industrialist Mark C. Honeywell was a Cocolobo Club member who bought Boca Chita Key in 1937, expanding the facilities to include a small lighthouse. Boca Chita Key was developed with several structures including an imitation lighthouse, built using coral rock and topped with a wire cage resembling a lighthouse lantern, and the end of a jetty on the north side of the key. The key was owned by Honeywell until 1945. Mark and Olive Honeywell also built a chapel, a guesthouse, seawalls and utility buildings on the island.

The Boca Chita Key structures are administered as a cultural landscape, interpreting the area's use as a retreat for the rich. More modest homesteads include the now-abandoned plantations developed by Israel Jones and his sons, and the Sweeting Homestead on Elliott Key. The frame structures associated with these plantations, together with those of the Cocolobo Cay Club and frame buildings on Boca Chita Key, have been destroyed by fire and hurricanes.

== Ecology ==
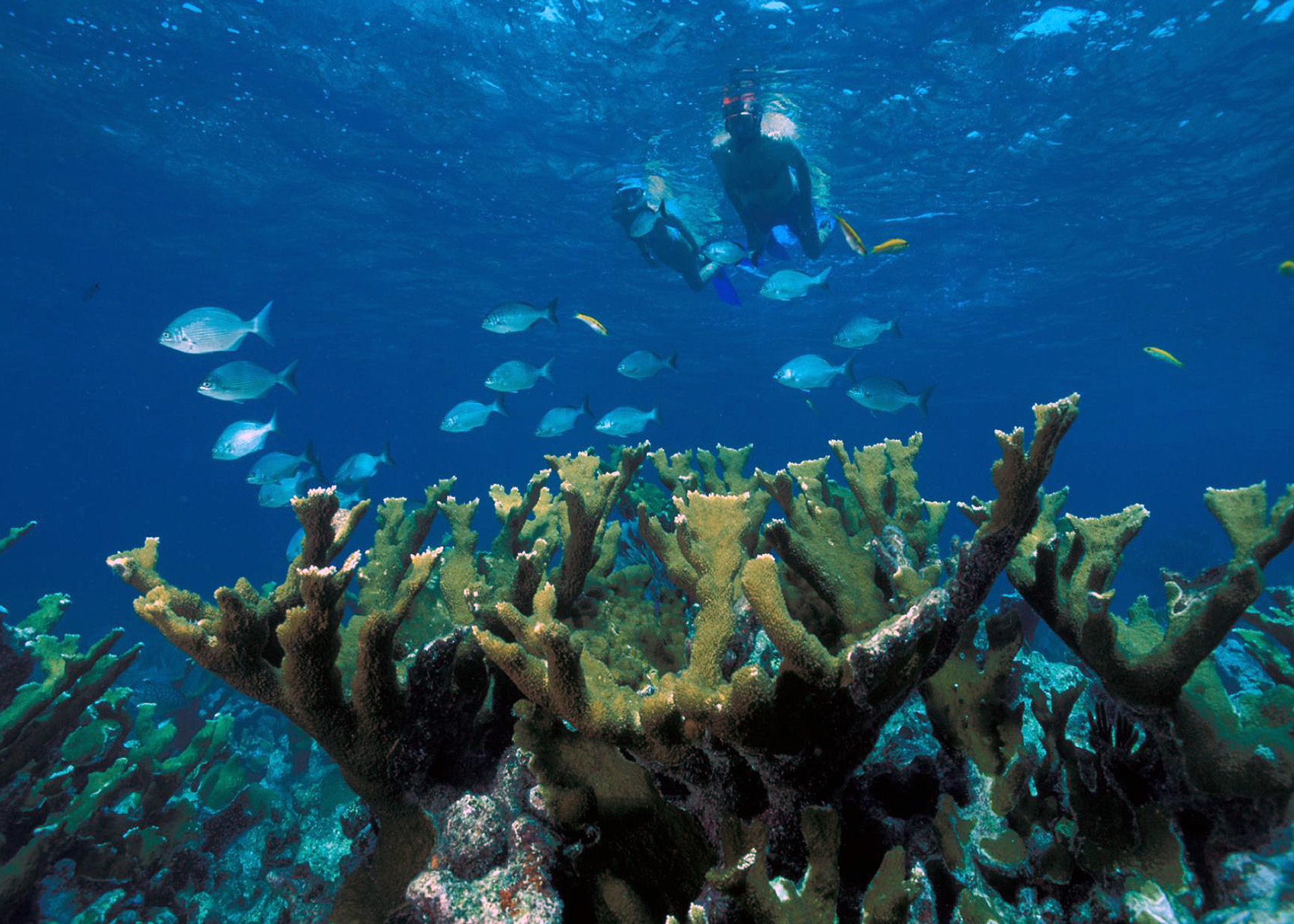
Snorkelers and elkhorn coral

South Florida is a transitional zone between the Nearctic and Neotropical realms, resulting in a wide variety of plant and animal life. The intersection of realms brings opportunities for visitors to see species, particularly birds, not seen elsewhere in North America. The park includes four distinct ecosystems, each supporting its own flora and fauna. Mangrove swamp, lagoon, island key and offshore reef habitats provide diversity for many species. In this semi-tropical environment, the seasons are differentiated mainly by rainfall. Warm to hot and wet summers bring occasional tropical storms. Though only marginally cooler, the winters tend to be relatively drier. Bay salinity varies accordingly, with lower salinity levels in the wet summer, trending to more fresh water on the west side where new fresh water flows in.

Hundreds of species of fish are present in park waters, including more than fifty crustacean species ranging from isopods to giant blue land crabs, about two hundred species of birds and about 27 mammal species, both terrestrial and marine. Molluscs include a variety of bivalves, terrestrial and marine snails, sea hares, sea slugs and two cephalopods, the Caribbean reef octopus and the Caribbean reef squid.

The sheltered open waters of the bay and the outlying chain of keys provide resting areas for migrating birds on their way between North American, the Caribbean islands, and South America. Many southbound land birds stop in the fall at Bill Baggs Cape Florida State Park, just north of the park on Key Biscayne, before venturing across the open waters of Biscayne Bay. Northbound spring migrants do likewise on Elliott Key. Most of the small passerine migrants are warblers, with ovenbirds, palm warblers, American redstarts, common yellowthroats, prairie warblers, worm-eating warblers and black-throated blue warblers accounting for the majority. Migrant raptors include short-tailed hawks, sharp-shinned hawks, merlins, peregrine falcons and swallow-tailed kites, while bald eagles and ospreys nest in the park. Both white-tailed and red-tailed tropicbirds are seen in the park, as are American flamingos, with some of the latter probably escaped captive birds.

=== Shoreline and mangrove swamp ===
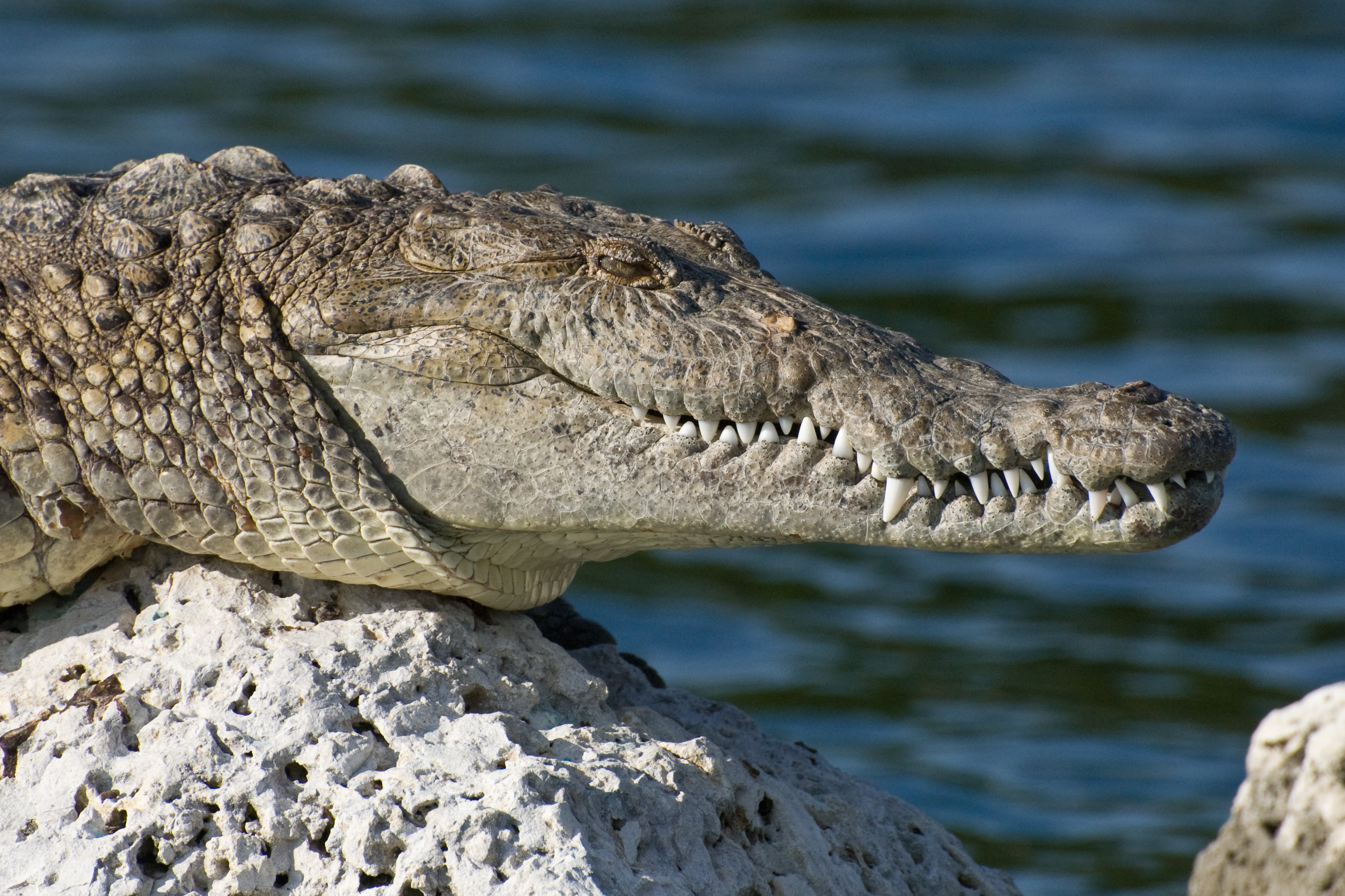
American crocodile

The mainland shorelines are dominated by a marshy transitional zone chiefly populated by red mangrove and black mangrove growing from the shallow water, with white mangrove growing farther back from the water's edge. The trees' aerial root structure provides a sheltered habitat for crabs, fish and wading birds. The brown waters within the mangrove thickets are nurseries for fish, mollusc and crustacean larvae that require a quiet sheltered environment before the immature animals can disperse into open waters. Mangroves shed leaves at about 2 to 4 short tons per acre (4.5 to 9.0 t/ha) per year, providing food for fish, worms and crustaceans. Because the carbon in the leaves is sequestered by incorporation into animals, the mangrove swamp is estimated to have two to three times the ability to sequester carbon of terrestrial forests. The mangrove forest on Biscayne Bay is the longest on Florida's east coast. Shoreline and island mangrove swamps, together with the bay, represent a significant nursery for the marine life of southeast Florida.

The salt-tolerant mangrove margin has expanded inland as freshwater flow into the bay has been channelized, replacing freshwater sawgrass marshes. The L-31E coastal storm surge levee inland of the park's western boundary has played a significant role in isolating former freshwater marshlands from their water sources. At the same time, tidal water does not reach the interior of the coastal margin, limiting interchange between salt and freshwater ecosystems.

Bird life on the shoreline includes yellow-crowned night herons, loggerhead shrikes, prairie warblers and shorebirds. Mangrove cuckoos, a notoriously difficult-to-observe species, may be seen at Convoy Point and Black Point. Biscayne has one of the largest populations of mangrove cuckoos in Florida.

The park's margins are habitat for the threatened American crocodile. The construction of miles of cooling water canals in the marl lands close to the shore behind the Turkey Point power plant, and the canals' warm waters, have provided a nearly ideal environment for crocodile nesting, making the power plant a nursery for many of those living in the park. Although crocodiles and American alligators both occur in extreme southern Florida, alligators are uncommon in Biscayne, since alligators mainly inhabit fresh waters found farther inland, while crocodiles can live in Biscayne's somewhat saltier estuarine waters.

=== Bay waters ===
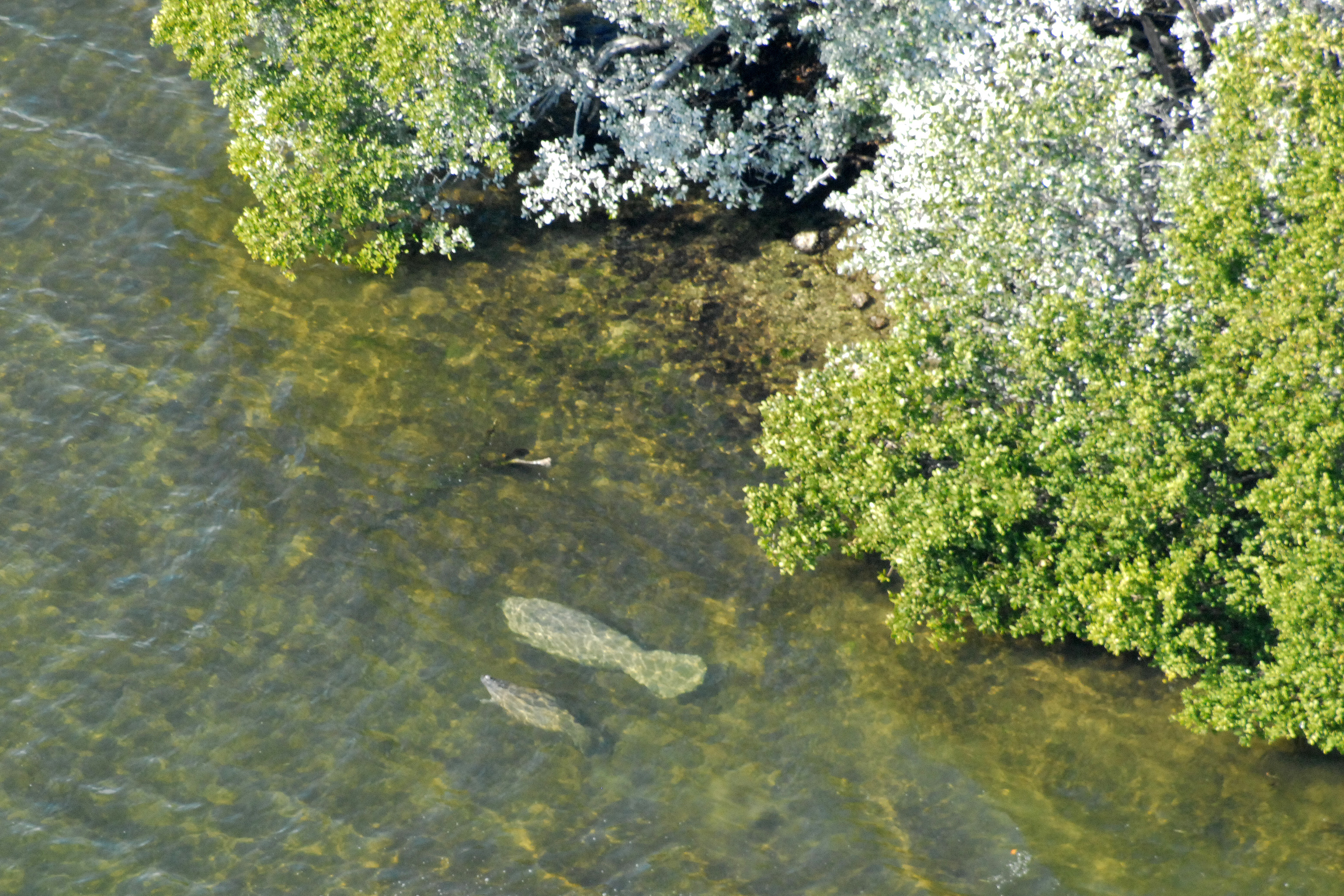
Manatees in Biscayne Bay

The open waters are inhabited by fishes, molluscs and crustaceans living on sea grasses or who prey on each other. The shallowness of the lagoon makes it suitable habitat for diving birds such as anhinga, cormorants and diving ducks. The bay also provides habitat for juvenile sea animals that have left the shelter of the mangrove belts. Manatees frequent the quiet waters of the bay. The bay has a year-round population of double-crested cormorants. Winter residents include northern gannets, American white pelicans and common loons. The bay also has a resident population of common bottlenose dolphins.

Biscayne Bay is a shallow lagoon with little vertical density or salinity gradient due to its lack of depth. Instead of a vertical gradient, the bay shows a horizontal density gradient, with fresh water entering from the drainage canals on the west side and seawater entering through gaps in the keys and through the safety valve section of shoals. Bay salinity reaches a peak in June. Changes in the salinity pattern of the bay have had negative effects on formerly abundant species such as red drum. Biscayne Bay and Florida Bay are major nurseries for red grouper and gray snapper. The bottom of the lagoon hosts sponges and soft corals in places where grasses cannot not grow. Three primary species of seagrass are found in the park: turtlegrass, shoal grass and manatee grass. Johnson's seagrass is also found in small quantities in the bay, which is at the southern end of the grass's range. Roughly 75 percent of the central bay floor is covered by grasses. Scarring of seagrass beds by vessel groundings or propellers is a significant problem. About 200 such incidents are documented each year, with full re-growth requiring up to 15 years. The bay is also affected by commercial shrimp trawling, which is permitted in park waters. The passage of roller-frame trawl nets does not harm grasses, but damages soft corals and sponges.

=== Keys ===
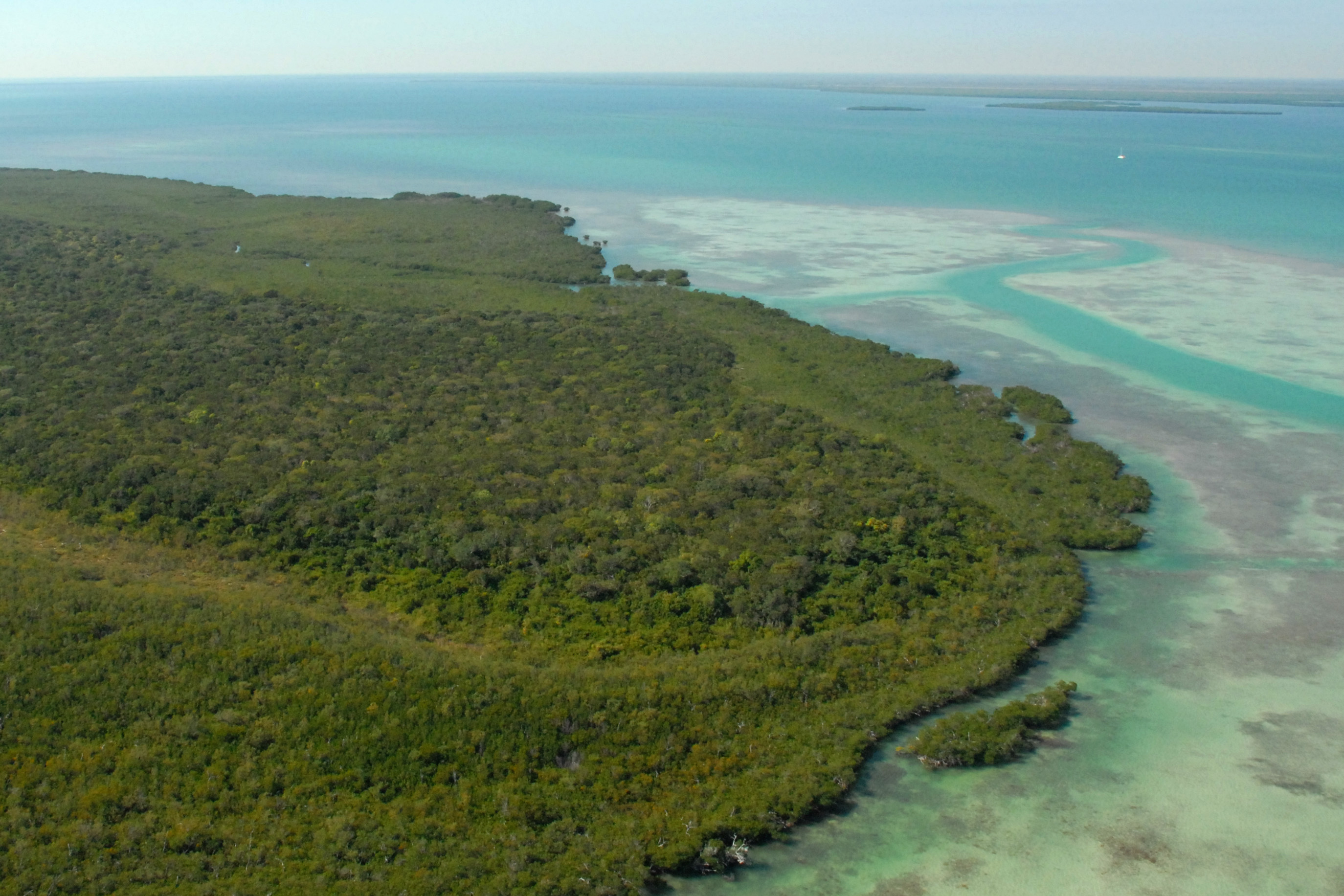
Totten Key and reefs

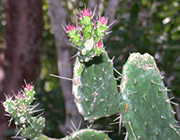
The semaphore prickly-pear cactus is only found in and near Biscayne National Park and may be the rarest plant in the U.S.

Elliott Key is the largest island in the park, measuring 1,650 acres (670 ha) and about 8.1 miles (13.0 km) long by 0.62 miles (1.00 km) wide. Next largest is Old Rhodes Key at 660 acres (270 ha), then Sands Key 420 acres (170 ha), Totten Key 380 acres (150 ha) and Little Totten Key at 200 acres (81 ha), with 37 smaller islands arranged in a north–south line 5 to 8.7 miles (8.0 to 14.0 km) east of the mainland shoreline. The keys shift from barrier islands with rocky cores in the north to coral rock platforms in the south. All are fringed with mangroves, with subtropical vegetation and hardwood forests in the interiors, including gumbo limbo, mahogany, ironwood, torchwood and satinleaf. Insects include Schaus' swallowtail, an endangered species, as well as dense clouds of mosquitoes in the wet season, preyed upon by dragonflies. Marsh rabbits and raccoons, together with mice and rats comprise the primary mammalian species. Reptiles include rattlesnakes and a variety of lizards, as well as an occasional crocodile.

The keys are a transitional area capable of hosting unexpected birds, often Caribbean species that have strayed near the mainland. The interior of the keys are frequented by warblers and the hawks that prey on them. Coastal zones are habitat for ruddy turnstones and least sandpipers. Gulls and terns include royal terns, laughing gulls and ring-billed gulls, with brown pelicans just offshore. Wilson's plovers nest on Boca Chita Key, where nesting zones are closed during breeding season.

Sea turtles nest on island beaches in the park. Park staff actively assist turtle nesting by removing debris from beaches that might pose an obstacle to adults and hatchlings. Loggerhead turtles are the most common sea turtle species and account for nearly all of the turtle nests in the park. Nest sites are identified by daily morning beach patrols and are protected with mesh screen against the predation by abundant raccoon population. Nest protection efforts have reduced predation from 100% of nests disturbed per year to no disturbed nests in 2007, with a more usual average of more than 50% nest disturbance in most years. In 2012, one undisturbed nest was found and protected, five partially disturbed nests were protected, and one nest was destroyed by predators. The threatened eastern indigo snake is also present on the island.

Rare and endangered plant species on the islands include Sargent's cherry palm and the semaphore prickly-pear cactus (Consolea corallicola). The cactus, which has been described as "near extinction", has been reduced to about 20 individuals. A colonial population of 570 cacti were found on one island in Biscayne Bay in 2001, making it the largest known population of semaphore prickly-pear cactus in the world. The only natural population of Sargent's palm grows on Elliott Key. Fewer than 50 grew on the key in 1991. Despite efforts to propagate the plant, there are now 16 Sargent's palms on Elliott Key, with about 123 propagated on Long Key.

Two critically endangered butterflies, Schaus' swallowtail (Papilio aristodemus) and the Miami blue, are found in the park, mostly on Elliott Key. In 2012 the U.S. Fish and Wildlife Service (USFWS) authorized a capture and captive breeding program for Schaus' swallowtail after only five of the butterflies were found by surveyors in the park, down from 35 in 2011, of a total surveyed Florida population of 41. The Miami blue was feared to be extinct after Hurricane Andrew in 1992, but a population was found in 1999 at Bahia Honda Key. Captive breeding produced 25,000 Miami blues, some of which have been released on Elliott Key with mixed results.

=== Coral reef and offshore waters ===
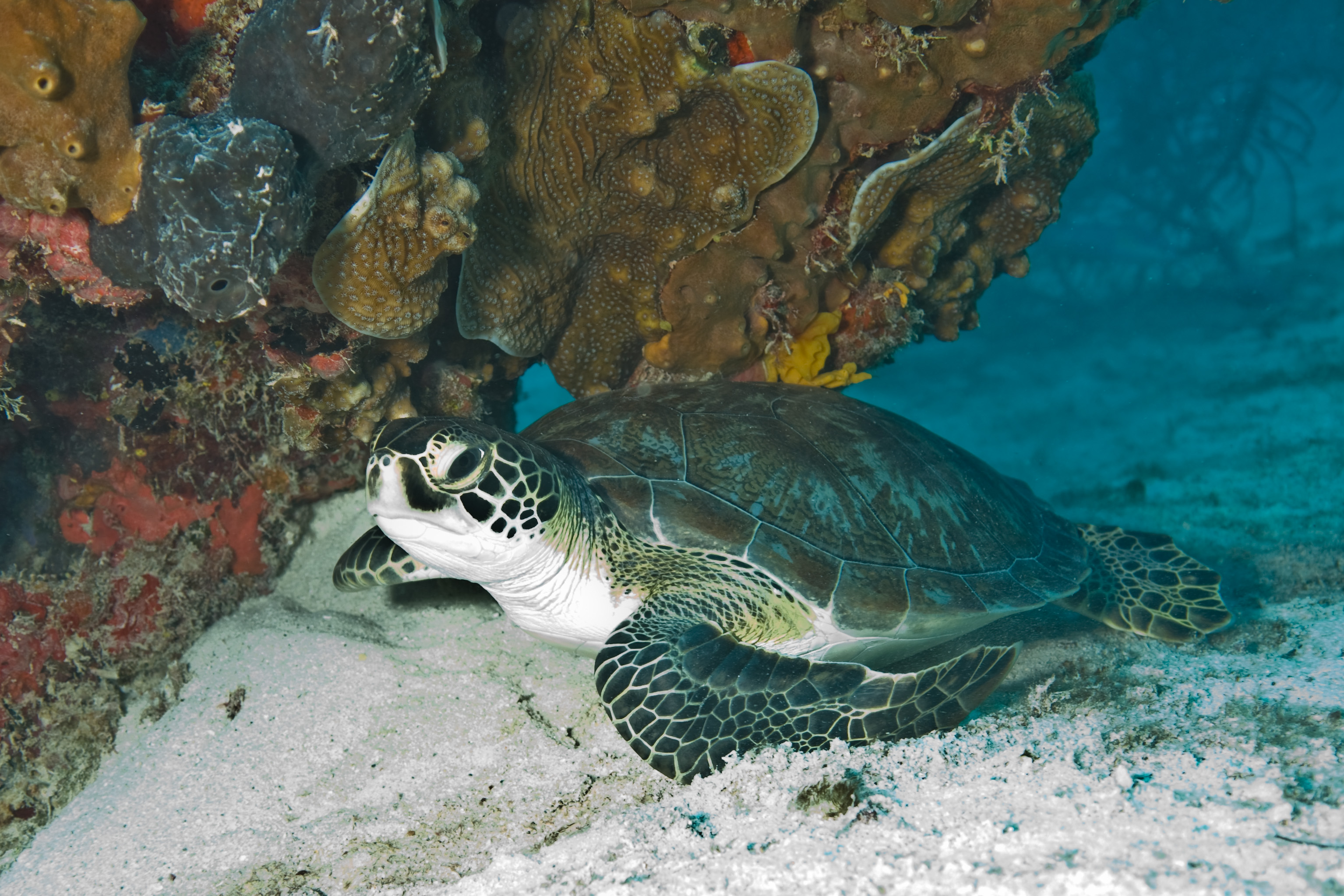
Green sea turtle

Beyond the keys in the Atlantic Ocean the seafloor slopes gradually down before rising in an almost continuous coral reef. The reef, composed of living corals, is inhabited by more than 200 species of fish, as well as molluscs, crustaceans and worms. Every coral species in park waters is considered protected by either federal or state regulations. Coral reefs are estimated to cover about half the area of the park, with about 4000 individual patch reefs and areas of bank-barrier reef. Hundreds of species of hard and soft corals, sea anemones and sponges are found in bay and offshore waters. The coral reefs may themselves be subdivided into the outer reef on the edge of the Florida carbonate platform, the patch reefs between the outer reef and the keys, and the reefs in the shoals on either side of the keys. The offshore reefs are dominated by elkhorn coral to 10-meter (33 ft) water depth, and staghorn coral below 10 meters. The landward patch reefs are principally composed of boulder star coral and symmetrical brain coral. The island shoal reefs mainly consist of lesser starlet coral and Porites finger corals.

Reef environments in Biscayne National Park have seen declines in species richness and diversity across all fish species from 1977 to 1981 to 2006–2007. A sampling program showed declines at all sampling sites. A correlation has been posited between the observed decline in coral reef coverage throughout the Florida Reef tract and the decline in fish species. Declines in populations were noted in both gamefish and in fish species not exposed to fishing pressure. Algal cover has increased as coral has declined, so coral-dwelling species have decreased while herbivorous fish have increased. Increased overall salinity and changing salinity gradients in Biscayne Bay may also play a role, while polychlorinated biphenyl and mercury contamination have been noted in fish samples.

The park's eastern boundary lies just beyond the rise of the offshore reef at ten-fathom (60-foot; 18 m) sea depth. Areas farther offshore are protected within the Florida Keys National Marine Sanctuary, which extends eastward to a boundary corresponding to a depth of 300 fathoms (1,800 ft; 550 m). The offshore waters harbor brown pelicans, magnificent frigatebirds, brown boobies, particularly around the offshore lights, and pelagic birds such as shearwaters and petrels. Whales in offshore waters are rare, but can include right whales, humpback whales, sperm whales, fin whales and sei whales, all of them endangered. The smalltooth sawfish is similarly rare in park waters and endangered. Threatened coral species include elkhorn and staghorn corals, as well as pillar coral, listed as endangered in Florida.

=== Exotic species ===
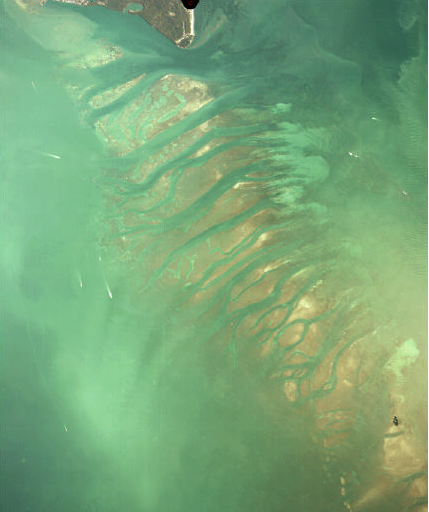
Biscayne Bay's "Safety Valve" is a natural outlet for storm surges.

More than 50 species of exotic plant have been documented in the park, with almost 20 of those considered to be pest species which may displace native plants and possibly alter the ecological balance. Green iguanas, cane toads, black rats, lionfish, fire ants, oscars and brown basilisk lizards are common in the park. The lionfish (Pterois volitans and Pterois miles) is a tropical fish from the Indian-Pacific Ocean area. It is known for its voracious appetite and its ability to establish itself in new waters, rapidly replacing other species. Researchers theorized the introduction of this species in the park occurred during Hurricane Andrew in 1992. Sightings in Biscayne Bay at that time were believed to have been from home aquariums destroyed during the hurricane, though the researcher who first proposed the theory has since retracted the assertion. More recent lionfish sightings are probably from more established populations in the Florida Keys to the south of the park. Also likely originating from human captivity, Burmese pythons have been observed near the park's boundary along the mainland. Exotic plant species which pose the highest risk to native plant communities include Brazilian-pepper, torpedo grass, tuberous sword fern, guava and portiatree.

== Climate ==
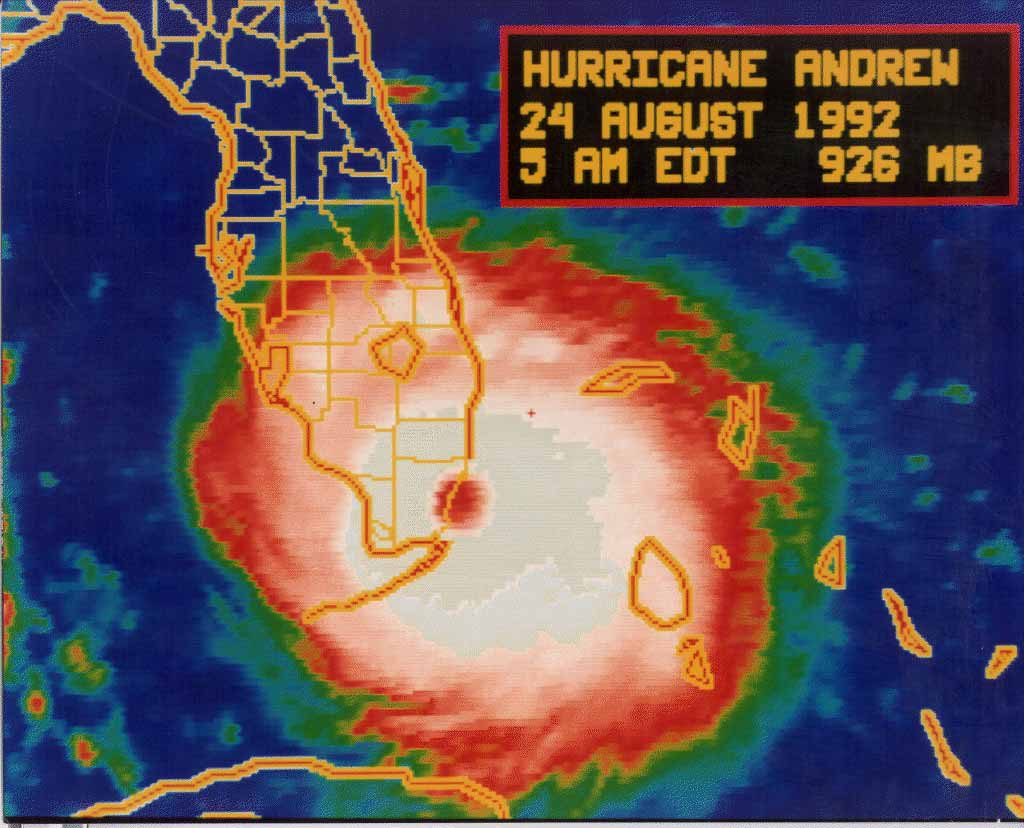
Hurricane Andrew at landfall on Biscayne Bay

Biscayne's tropical climate reflects its location in extreme South Florida. Southern Miami-Dade County is classified as having a tropical savanna climate in the Köppen-Geiger system, with the park bordering on a tropical monsoon climate. Seasons may be divided into the November–April dry season and the May–October wet season. Dry season temperatures average between 66 and 76 °F (19 and 24 °C) with an average monthly rainfall of 2.1 inches (53 mm). Wet season temperatures average between 76 and 85 °F (24 and 29 °C) with an average monthly rainfall of 5.39 inches (137 mm). The wet season roughly coincides with hurricane season, with frequent thunderstorms.

Like many locations in southern Florida, Biscayne National Park is affected by hurricanes every few years. Most storms require temporary closings and occasional repairs to park facilities. A direct hit by a powerful hurricane can produce severe consequences, primarily by its impact on human interventions in the environment rather than on the natural environment of the park, which is well-adapted to these events. Significant hurricanes to strike Biscayne include storms in 1835 and 1904, the 1906 Florida Keys hurricane, the 1926 Miami hurricane, the 1929 Bahamas hurricane, the 1935 Labor Day hurricane, the 1935 Yankee hurricane, the 1941 Florida hurricane, the 1945 Southeast Florida hurricane, the 1948 Miami hurricane, Hurricane King in 1950, Hurricane Donna in 1960,. Hurricane Cleo in 1964, and Hurricane Andrew in 1992. The park can be affected by wave action from more distant tropical storms such as 2012's Hurricane Sandy, which damaged facilities on Elliott Key.

On August 24, 1992, Hurricane Andrew came ashore just south of Miami, passing directly across Biscayne National Park with maximum sustained winds of 141 miles per hour (227 km/h), with gusts to 169 mph (272 km/h). The storm surge was up to 17 ft (5.2 m) above mean sea level. It was a compact Category 5 hurricane on the Saffir-Simpson Hurricane Scale. Biscayne Bay was affected by bottom scouring and turbidity and with damage to its fringes of mangrove forest. Leakage from damaged boats and marinas polluted the bay with fuel, with discharges continuing for nearly a month after the hurricane's passage. A commemorative plaque was placed at the Dante Fascell Visitor Center in 2002 to commemorate the human and environmental cost of Andrew, and to celebrate the area's recovery from the storm's effects. The inscription reads in part:

On Monday, August 24, 1992, at 4:30 a.m., the eye wall of Hurricane Andrew passed over this point before striking Homestead and southern Miami-Dade County.

The Fowey Rocks light station transmitted weather data with winds peaking at a two-minute wind speed of 127 knots (235 km/h) and a gust to 147 knots (272 km/h) before the station ceased transmitting, presumably due to damage from stronger gusts. The strongest part of the eyewall had not reached Fowey Rocks when it stopped transmitting.

Since all park lands are no more than a few feet above sea level, they are vulnerable to rising sea levels. Park Service studies project that much of the park's land area will be lost in the next two hundred years. Sea level in Biscayne Bay is projected to rise between 3 and 7 inches (8 and 18 cm) by 2030, and 9 to 24 inches (23 to 61 cm) by 2060. A sea level rise of 3 to 6 inches (8 to 15 cm) is projected to increase saltwater intrusion into the Biscayne Aquifer. Higher rises will make the southern Everglades a saltwater marsh, altering the ecology of the region.

Climate data for Elliott Key Ranger Station, elevation 0 ft (0 m), 1981-2010 normals, extremes 1981-2019
Month	Jan	Feb	Mar	Apr	May	Jun	Jul	Aug	Sep	Oct	Nov	Dec	Year
Record high °F (°C)	83.7 (28.7)	87.1 (30.6)	88.0 (31.1)	92.2 (33.4)	91.2 (32.9)	93.9 (34.4)	95.0 (35.0)	93.6 (34.2)	92.3 (33.5)	89.9 (32.2)	88.7 (31.5)	86.7 (30.4)	95.0 (35.0)
Mean daily maximum °F (°C)	74.1 (23.4)	75.5 (24.2)	76.8 (24.9)	79.0 (26.1)	82.1 (27.8)	85.5 (29.7)	87.2 (30.7)	87.3 (30.7)	86.4 (30.2)	83.2 (28.4)	79.2 (26.2)	75.9 (24.4)	81.0 (27.2)
Mean daily minimum °F (°C)	61.8 (16.6)	63.5 (17.5)	66.0 (18.9)	68.7 (20.4)	73.6 (23.1)	77.0 (25.0)	78.6 (25.9)	78.9 (26.1)	78.3 (25.7)	75.0 (23.9)	69.8 (21.0)	64.6 (18.1)	71.4 (21.9)
Record low °F (°C)	35.0 (1.7)	38.6 (3.7)	43.6 (6.4)	51.7 (10.9)	59.5 (15.3)	65.9 (18.8)	72.6 (22.6)	72.0 (22.2)	70.8 (21.6)	55.9 (13.3)	47.7 (8.7)	32.8 (0.4)	32.8 (0.4)
Average precipitation inches (mm)	1.85 (47)	1.91 (49)	2.62 (67)	2.55 (65)	4.64 (118)	7.83 (199)	5.41 (137)	7.09 (180)	7.56 (192)	5.18 (132)	2.85 (72)	1.79 (45)	51.28 (1,303)
Average dew point °F (°C)	59.9 (15.5)	61.1 (16.2)	62.2 (16.8)	64.1 (17.8)	69.0 (20.6)	73.5 (23.1)	74.3 (23.5)	74.7 (23.7)	74.5 (23.6)	71.5 (21.9)	66.4 (19.1)	62.3 (16.8)	67.8 (19.9)
Source: PRISM

== See also ==
- List of national parks of the United States

== Bibliography ==
- Bryan, Jonathan; Scott, Thomas M.; Means, Guy H. (2009), Roadside Geology of Florida. Mountain Press. ISBN 978-0-87842-542-6.
- Grunwald, Michael (2006). The Swamp: The Everglades, Florida, and the Politics of Paradise. Simon & Schuster. ISBN 978-0-7432-5105-1
- Hach, Steve (2004), Cold War in South Florida Historic Resource Study. National Park Service.
- Harris, Ann G.; Tuttle, Esther; Tuttle, Sherwood D. (2004). Geology of the National Parks, 6th ed. Kendall/Hunt. ISBN 978-0-7872-9971-2
- Leynes, Jennifer Brown; Cullison, David (1998), Biscayne National Park Historic Resource Study, National Park Service
- Miller, Lloyd (2008), Biscayne National Park: It Almost Wasn't, LEMDOT Publishing. ISBN 978-0-615-17494-5.
- National Park Service (NPS) (2011), Biscayne National Park: Draft General Management Plan/Environmental Impact Statement
- National Parks Conservation Association (NPCA) (2006), State of the Parks: Biscayne National Park
- Shumaker, Susan (2012), Untold Stories from America's National Parks: Israel Lafayette "Parson" Jones, Sir Lancelot Jones and Biscayne National Park. Public Broadcasting Service.
