= Elliott Key =

Northernmost of the true Florida Keys in the United States of America

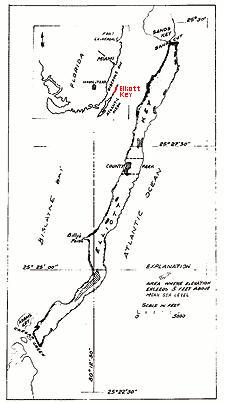
- Sketch of Elliott Key

- Elliott Key Elliott Key (North Atlantic)

Geography
- Location: Atlantic Ocean
- Coordinates: 25°26′35″N 80°11′50″W

Administration
- United States
- State: Florida
- County: Miami-Dade

Elliott Key is the northernmost of the true Florida Keys (those 'keys' which are ancient coral reefs lifted above the present sea level), and the largest key north of Key Largo. It is located entirely within Biscayne National Park, in Miami-Dade County, Florida, east of Homestead, Florida. It is bordered by the Atlantic Ocean to the east, Biscayne Bay to the west, Sands Key (across Sands Cut) to the north, and Old Rhodes Key (across Caesar Creek) to the south. Adams Key is just west of the southern end of Elliott Key. Elliott Key is about seven miles (11 km) long. Its maximum width is about 2,500 feet (760 m) near the north end, and its average width is less than 2,000 feet (610 m). The higher elevations on the island range from 6 to 8 feet (1.8 to 2.4 m) above sea level and occur generally along an unimproved road that runs longitudinally through the center of the island. The average elevation is about 3 feet (0.91 m) above sea level. The key is accessible only by boat. Elliott Key has a National Park Service campground, but is otherwise uninhabited.

== History ==
Elliott Key was used on a transient basis for millennia by Tequesta Indians, and, in the 19th century, by fishermen and wreckers from the lower Florida Keys. The earlier name for the key was Ledbury Key, named after a snow that was driven ashore in 1769. There are legends of Elliott Key and adjacent keys being used as a refuge by pirates and escaped slaves. The chief pirate of legend is Black Caesar, who is said to have escaped from a slave ship, and used Elliott Key as his base. The key was inhabited and the site of pineapple plantations in the latter part of the 19th century and the first half of the 20th century. In 1910, there were more than a dozen families raising pineapples on Elliott Key, where an average crop was 50,000 to 75,000 dozen fruits, mostly sent by schooner to New York.

In the 1950s, it was proposed to build a highway (with a causeway across the Safety Valve) from Key Biscayne to Key Largo, connecting Elliott Key and other keys to the mainland and the rest of the Florida Keys. This led to the incorporation of the city of Islandia, Florida, encompassing the keys north of Key Largo up to the Ragged Keys. In anticipation of the highway, and to forestall designation of the northernmost keys as a park, developers cleared most of the land on Elliott Key and dredged channels around it. With the establishment of the Biscayne National Monument in 1968 and the purchase of private property in the park by the Federal government, development of the highway and of Elliott Key was halted, and the money that was allocated for the proposed causeway was used to build a replacement Card Sound Bridge connecting northern Key Largo to the mainland. The City of Islandia was abolished in 2012.

On August 24, 1992, Hurricane Andrew made landfall on Elliott Key.
