= Boca Chita Key =

Island in the upper Florida Keys, US

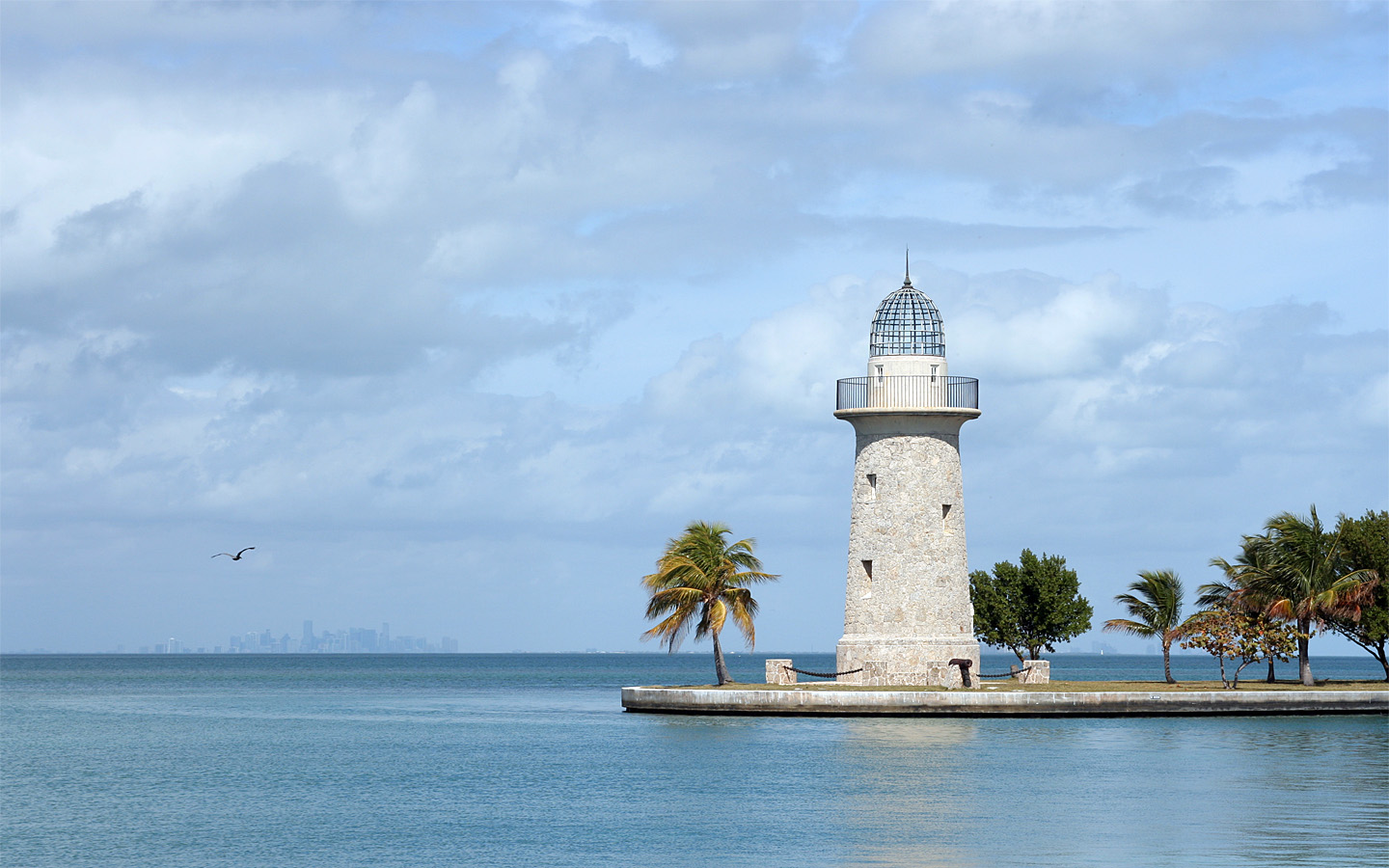
- The 65-foot (20 m) Boca Chita Lighthouse is ornamental, built by a previous owner of the island.

- Boca Chita Key Boca Chita Key (North Atlantic)

Geography
- Location: Atlantic Ocean
- Coordinates: 25.5231°N 80.1746°W

Administration
- United States
- State: Florida
- County: Miami-Dade

Boca Chita Key is the island north of the upper Florida Keys in Biscayne National Park, Miami-Dade County, Florida.

The key is located in Biscayne Bay, just north of Sands Key. An ornamental 65-foot (20 m) lighthouse is present on the key. The harbor has a bulkhead with cleats where boats may be tied. There is a campground with picnic tables and salt water toilets. Fresh water and electricity are not available on the island.

On the north-west part of the island is the Boca Chita Key Historic District containing historic structures such as the Boca Chita lighthouse.

== Gallery ==
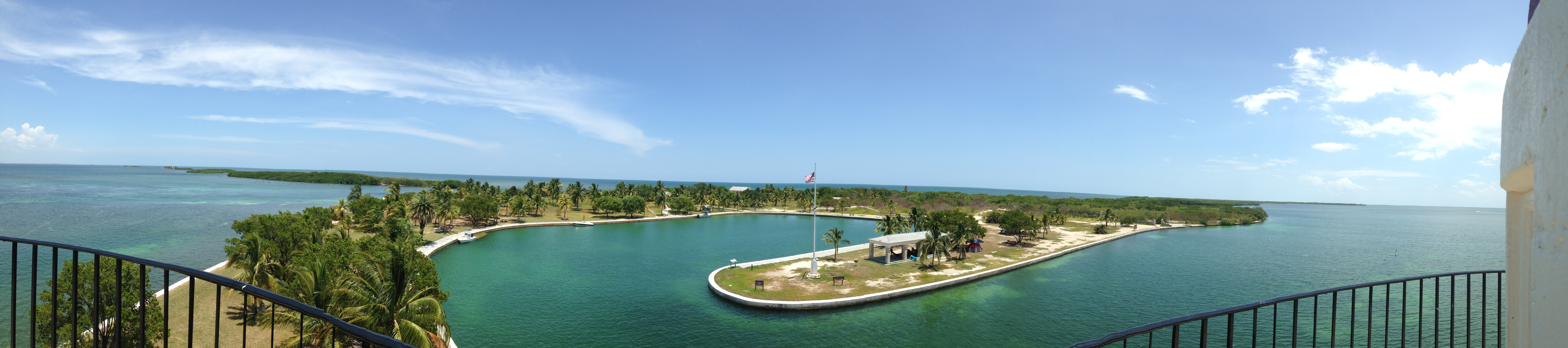
View of Boca Chita Key from the Lighthouse
