= Offshore Reefs Archeological District =

Historic district in Florida, United States

- U.S. National Register of Historic Places
- U.S. Historic district
- Location within Florida Location within the United States
- Location: Miami-Dade County, Florida
- Nearest city: Homestead
- Coordinates: 25°25′53″N 80°09′54″W
- Area: 226,400 acres (916 km^{2})
- NRHP reference No.: 84000838
- Added to NRHP: August 24, 1984

The Offshore Reefs Archeological District is a U.S. historic district (designated as such on August 24, 1984) east of Homestead, Florida. It is located across a 30-mile stretch along the eastern edge of the Biscayne National Park.
