= Islandia, Florida =

- Unincorporated community
- Location in Miami-Dade County and the state of Florida

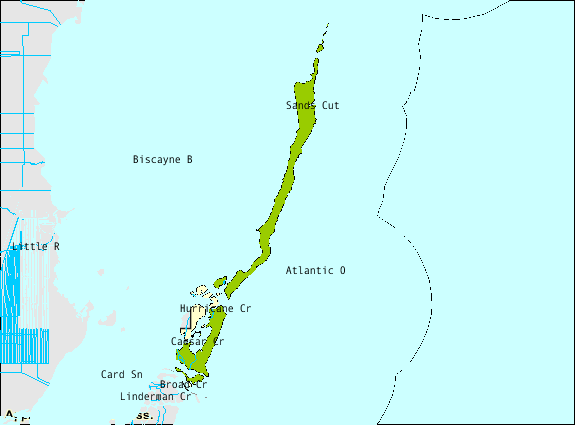
- U.S. Census Bureau map showing limits of former city
- Coordinates: 25°23′18″N 80°14′10″W
- Country: United States
- State: Florida
- County: Miami-Dade

Area
  - Total: 66.4 sq mi (171.9 km^{2})
  - Land: 6.4 sq mi (16.7 km^{2})
  - Water: 59.9 sq mi (155.2 km^{2})
- Elevation: 3.3 ft (1 m)

Population (2010)
  - Total: 18
  - Density: 2.8/sq mi (1.1/km^{2})
- Time zone: UTC-5 (Eastern (EST))
  - Summer (DST): UTC-4 (EDT)
- FIPS code: 12-34175
- GNIS feature ID: 0304638

Islandia is an unincorporated community and former city in Miami-Dade County, Florida, United States. It is located in the upper Florida Keys on the islands of Elliott Key and other nearby keys, such as Totten Key. It was the only municipality in the Florida Keys not located in neighboring Monroe County. The population was 18 at the 2010 Census. Most residents of the city were National Park Service employees.

In the 2010 Primary Election, the Miami-Dade County Commission was empowered via a charter amendment to abolish Islandia. On December 6, 2011, Miami-Dade County Commissioners unanimously approved an ordinance to abolish the city, with final action to be taken after a public hearing. Following a public hearing, the ordinance abolishing Islandia received final approval on March 6, 2012, and took effect on March 16, 2012.

== History ==
Islandia, particularly Elliott Key, was originally fished by the Native American Tequesta people. It subsequently became a haven for shipwreck survivors. By the mid-1800s, a group of Bahamians had made their way to the key, where they unsuccessfully tried farming on an island with a base of coral rock. By the early 1900s, Islandia had its own school district and more than 100 residents. However, the number of residents dwindled over time due to the lack of electricity, poor farming, and the relatively long distance from the mainland.

In 1950 the Dade County Planning Board announced a plan to build a highway connecting Key Biscayne with the Overseas Highway on Key Largo. The project envisioned a series of bridges connecting artificial islands, to be built on the Safety Valve, and existing small keys to Elliott Key and on to Key Largo. When the Dade County Planning Board was unable to secure a right of way for the highway across the southern end of Key Biscayne, it dropped the plan.

At the end of 1960, however, 13 of the island's 18 registered voters approved the incorporation of a municipality, and the 33 northernmost islands of the Florida Keys became the city of Islandia. Developers and the residents revived the plan to build a causeway across the bay, and sought to fill Elliott Key with luxury hotels, golf courses, oceanfront homes, and a six-lane roadway running down the center of the key. A grassroots opposition of fishermen, gardeners, and elected state leaders opposed the plan, and sought to include the islands in the national park system. Islandia mayor Luther Brooks and his small city council fought back, and at one point obtained a large bulldozer and cleared a 125-foot (38 m) wide swath down the center of Elliott Key as the beginning of the proposed six-lane Elliott Key Boulevard.

Nevertheless, the purchase by the federal government of most of the land on Elliott Key ended those plans, and in 1968, Islandia was made a part of Biscayne National Monument (which later became Biscayne National Park). What remains today of the failed Elliott Key Boulevard is an 8-foot (2.4 m) wide nature trail covered by a tree canopy that is mockingly referred to as "Spite Highway."

By 1990, exasperated by decades of the city not filing papers or following municipal procedures, the state of Florida ruled all of Islandia's elections illegal on the grounds that only land owners, as opposed to all residents, had been permitted to vote, in violation of voting-rights laws. The state called for the dismantling of the municipality. In December 2011, the Miami-Dade County Commission finally agreed, and the area reverted to unincorporated status in March 2012 after the Commission gave final approval to the ordinance abolishing the City of Islandia.

== Geography ==
Islandia is located at 25°23′18″N 80°14′10″W (25.388299, -80.236180).

According to the United States Census Bureau, the city had a total area of 66.4 square miles (172 km^{2}). 6.4 square miles (17 km^{2}) of it is land and 59.9 square miles (155 km^{2}) of it (90.28%) is water.

=== Surrounding areas ===
- Biscayne Bay
- Biscayne Bay Atlantic Ocean
- Biscayne Bay Atlantic Ocean
- Key Largo Atlantic Ocean
- Key Largo, Atlantic Ocean

== Demographics ==
=== 2010 ===
At the 2010 census, there were 18 people in 3 households, including 3 families, in the city. The population density was 2.7 inhabitants per square mile (1.0/km^{2}). There were 3 housing units at an average density of 0.4 inhabitants/mi^{2} (0.2 persons/km^{2}). The racial makeup of the city was 100.0% White (11.1% Non-Hispanic White). Hispanic or Latino of any race were 88.9% of the population (44.4% Salvadoran, 38.9% Guatemalan, 5.6% Peruvian).

There are 3 households, 2 had children under the age of 18 living with them, 3 had a female householder with no husband present living together. The average household size was 6.00 and the average family size was 5.33.

The age distribution was 6 under the age of 18, 8 from 25 to 44, 3 from 45 to 64 years, and 1 from 65 years and over. The median age was 31.5 years. For every female there was 0.3 males. For every female of age 18 and over, there were 0.2 males.

The median household income was $47,214. The per capita income for the city was $32,064. None of the population was below the poverty line.

=== 2000 ===
At the 2000 census, there were six people, three households, and one family residing in the city. The population density was 0.9 inhabitants per square mile (0.35/km^{2}). There were five housing units at an average density of 0.8 inhabitants/mi^{2} (0.3 persons/km^{2}). The racial makeup of the city was 100% White.

There are three households, one had children under the age of 18 living with them, one was a married couple living together, and two were non-families. Two households were made up of individuals. The average household size was two, and the average family size was four. For every female, there was 0.3 males. For every female of age 18 and over, there were 0.2 males.

The age distribution was two under the age of 18, two from 25 to 44, and two from 45 to 64. The median age was 32 years. For every female, there was one male. For every woman age 18 and over, there was one man.

The median household income was $41,875, and the median family income was $80,488. Males had a median income of $41,875 versus $0 for females. The per capita income for the city was $27,000. None of the population was below the poverty line.
