= C15H26O =

The molecular formula C_{15}H_{26}O may refer to:

- Bisabolol (Levomenol)
- α-Cadinol
- δ-Cadinol
- τ-Cadinol
- Carotol
- Cedrol
- Cubebol
- Farnesol
- Guaiol
- Indonesiol
- Junenol
- Juniperol
- Ledol
- Mysantol
- Nerolidol
- Patchouli alcohol
- Viridiflorol

== See also ==
- Cadinol
