= Hardwood =

Wood from angiosperm trees

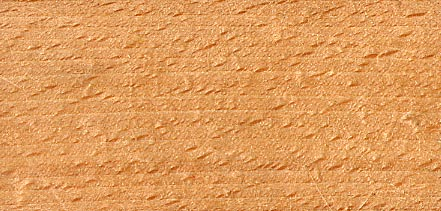
Beech is a popular hardwood.

Hardwood is wood from flowering (angiosperm) trees. These are usually found in broad-leaved temperate and tropical forests. In temperate and boreal latitudes, they are mostly deciduous, but in the tropics and subtropics, they are mostly evergreen. Hardwood (which comes from angiosperm trees) contrasts with softwood (which is from gymnosperm trees).

== Characteristics ==
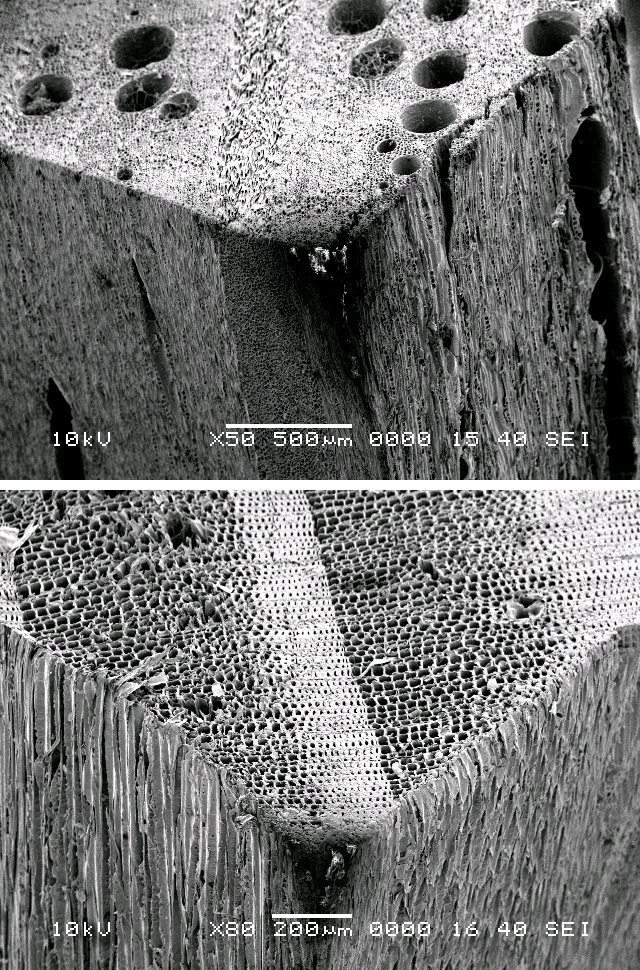
SEM images showing the presence of pores in hardwoods (oak, top) and absence in softwoods (pine, bottom)

Hardwoods are produced by angiosperm trees that reproduce by flowers, and have broad leaves. Many species are deciduous. Those of temperate regions lose their leaves every autumn as temperatures fall and are dormant in the winter, but those of tropical regions may shed their leaves in response to seasonal or sporadic periods of drought. Hardwood from deciduous species, such as oak, normally shows annual growth rings, but these may be absent in some tropical hardwoods.

Hardwoods have a more complex structure than softwoods and are often much slower growing as a result. The dominant feature separating "hardwoods" from softwoods is the presence of pores, or vessels. The vessels may show considerable variation in size, shape of perforation plates (simple, scalariform, reticulate, foraminate), and structure of cell walls, such as spiral thickenings. Several specific microscopic features are used in the identification process of a hardwood species.

As the name suggests, the wood from these trees is generally harder than that of softwoods, but there are significant exceptions. In both groups there is an enormous variation in actual wood hardness, with the range in density in hardwoods completely including that of softwoods; some hardwoods (e.g., balsa) are softer than most softwoods, while yew is an example of a hard softwood.

== Chemistry ==
The structural polymers of hardwoods are cellulose, hemicellulose, and lignin. The constituents of hardwood lignin differs from those included in softwood. Sinapyl alcohol and coniferyl alcohol are the main monomers of hardwood lignin.

Hardwoods contain a smaller quantity of non-structural constituents, named extractives, than softwoods. These extractives are usually categorized into three broad groups: aliphatic compounds, terpenes and phenolic compounds. Aliphatic compounds found in hardwoods include fatty acids, fatty alcohols and their esters with glycerol, fatty alcohols (waxes) and sterols (steryl esters), hydrocarbons, such as alkanes, sterols, such as sitosterol, sitostanol and campesterol. The terpene content of the hardwood significantly differs from the softwood, and mainly consists of triterpenoids, polyprenols and other higher terpenes. Triterpenoids commonly purified from hardwoods include cycloartenol, betulin and squalene. Hardwood polyterpenes are rubber, gutta percha, gutta-balatá and betulaprenols. Although in small quantities, hardwoods also contain mono-, sesqui- and diterpenes, such as α- and β-pinenes, 3-carene, β-myrcene, limonene, hinokitiol, δ-cadinene, α- and δ-cadinols, borneol. Hardwood is rich in phenolic compounds, such as stilbenes, lignans, norlignans, tannins, flavonoids.

== Applications ==
Hardwoods are employed in a large range of applications, including fuel, tools, construction, boat building, furniture making, musical instruments, flooring, cooking, barrels, and manufacture of charcoal. Solid hardwood joinery tends to be expensive compared to softwood. In the past, tropical hardwoods were easily available, but the supply of some species, such as Burma teak and mahogany, is now becoming scarce due to over-exploitation. Cheaper "hardwood" doors, for instance, now consist of a thin veneer bonded to a core of softwood, plywood or medium-density fibreboard (MDF). Hardwoods may be used in a variety of objects, but are most frequently seen in furniture or musical instruments because of their density which adds to durability, appearance, and performance. Different species of hardwood lend themselves to different end uses or construction processes. This is due to the variety of characteristics apparent in different timbers, including density, grain, pore size, growth and fibre pattern, flexibility and ability to be steam bent. For example, the interlocked grain of elm wood (Ulmus spp.) makes it suitable for the making of chair seats where the driving in of legs and other components can cause splitting in other woods.

=== Cooking ===
There is a correlation between density and calories/volume. This makes the denser hardwoods like oak, cherry, and apple more suited for camp fires, cooking fires, and smoking meat, as they tend to burn hotter and longer than softwoods like pine or cedar whose low-density construction and highly-flammable pitch make them burn quickly and without producing quite as much heat.

== See also ==
- List of woods
- Hardwood flooring
- Softwood
- Brinell hardness test
- Janka hardness test
