= Big Torch Key =

Island in the lower Florida Keys, United States

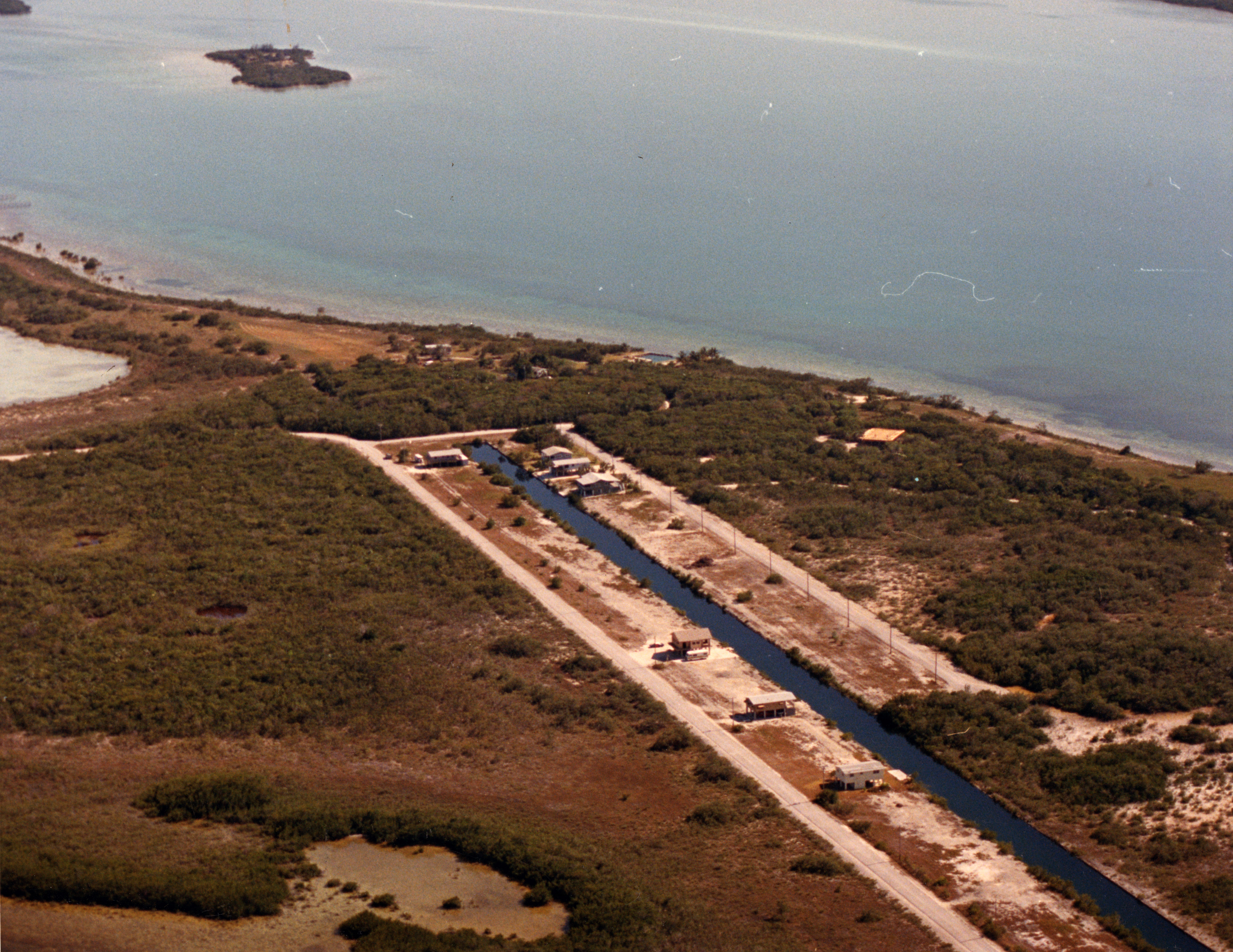
- Aerial view of Big Torch Key, October 1987

- Big Torch Key Big Torch Key (the Caribbean)

Geography
- Location: Gulf of Mexico
- Coordinates: 24.71826°N 81.438346°W

Administration
- United States
- State: Florida
- County: Monroe

Big Torch Key is an island in the lower Florida Keys.

It is located to the north of Middle Torch Key, connected to it via a causeway.

It is named for the Sea Torchwood (Amyris elemifera L.), a native species of tree found on the island.

It is the site of an early settlement.

Although it is the largest of the three large Torch Keys, it is the only one not traversed by U.S. 1.
