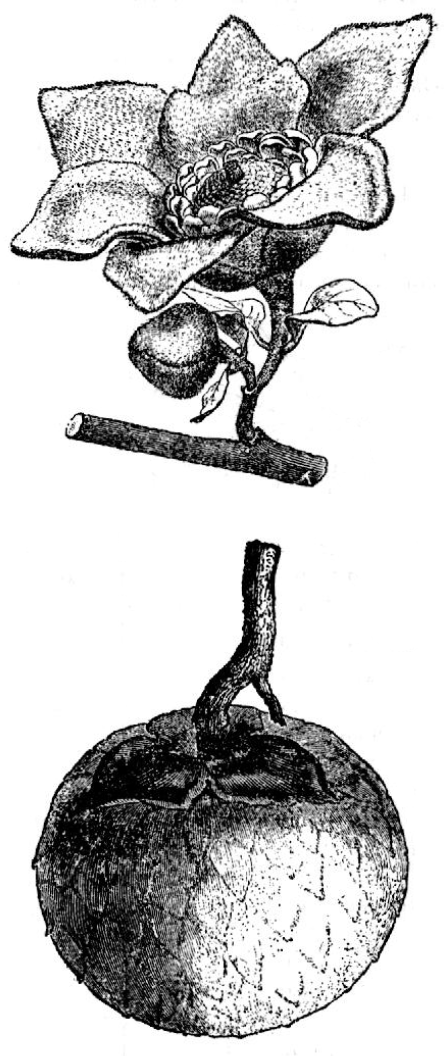
- Botanical illustrations of Fusaea longifolia

Conservation status
- Least Concern (IUCN 3.1)

Scientific classification
- Kingdom: Plantae
- Clade: Embryophytes
- Clade: Tracheophytes
- Clade: Spermatophytes
- Clade: Angiosperms
- Clade: Magnoliids
- Order: Magnoliales
- Family: Annonaceae
- Genus: Fusaea
- Species: F. longifolia

Binomial name
- Fusaea longifolia (Aubl.) Saff.

Synonyms
- Aberemoa longifolia (Aubl.) Baill.; Annona longifolia Aubl.; Annona rhombipetala Ruiz & Pav. ex G.Don; Duguetia longifolia (Aubl.) Baill.; Fusaea decurrens R.E.Fr.; Fusaea rhombipetala (Ruiz & Pav. ex G.Don) J.F.Macbr.; Uvaria spectabilis DC.

= Fusaea longifolia =

Species of plant

Fusaea longifolia is a species of flowering plant in the family Annonaceae. It is a shrub or tree native to Brazil, Colombia, Ecuador, French Guiana, Guyana, Peru, Suriname and Venezuela. Jean Baptiste Christophore Fusée Aublet, the French botanist who first formally described the species using the basionym Annona longifolia, named it after its long-leaved (longus and -folium in Latin) foliage.

== Description ==
Fusea longifolia is a tree or bush. It has very short petioles. Its oblong leaves are 25 by 8 centimeters and come to a long tapering point at their tip. The upper surface of the leaves is hairless, while the underside has sparse hairs. Its flowers are extra-axillary, and occur alone or in pairs. The flowers are on long pedicels. The pedicels have 1–2 bracteoles. Its sepals are partially fused to form a 3-lobed calyx. The outer surface of the calyx is covered in rust-colored hairs. Its flowers have 6 purple, oval to oblong petals in two rows of three. Its flowers have numerous stamens. The outer stamens are sterile and have a petal-like appearance. The inner stamens are fertile, and the tissue connecting the anther lobes extends to form a cap. The fruits are round, smooth with a network pattern on the surface, and have red pulp with numerous seeds.

=== Reproductive biology ===
The pollen of F. longifolia is shed as loose, permanent, tetragonal or tetrahedral tetrads that are 115 micrometers in diameter.

=== Habitat and distribution ===
It has been observed growing in forest habitats.

=== Uses ===
Aublet and Safford describe it as edible and report that it is consumed by the indigenous people of French Guiana. Extracts from the leaves have been reported to contain bioactive molecules including alpha-Cadinol and Spathulenol.
