= Torch Keys (Florida) =

- Interactive map of Torch Keys

Geography
- Location: Florida Keys
- Coordinates: Little Torch; 24.6686°N 81.3907°W; Middle Torch; 24.6852°N 81.4063°W; Big Torch; 24.71561°N 81.4365°W
- Type: Key
- Total islands: 3

The Torch Keys are three islands in the lower Florida Keys, consisting of Little Torch Key, Middle Torch Key, and Big Torch Key. Little Torch Key is the most populated of the three. The islands were named for their forests of Sea Torchwood (Amyris elemifera), which are effective as kindling even when green. The Torch Keys are located just west of Big Pine Key, or about 28 miles (45 km) east of Key West.
