= Little Torch Key =

Island in the lower Florida Keys, United States

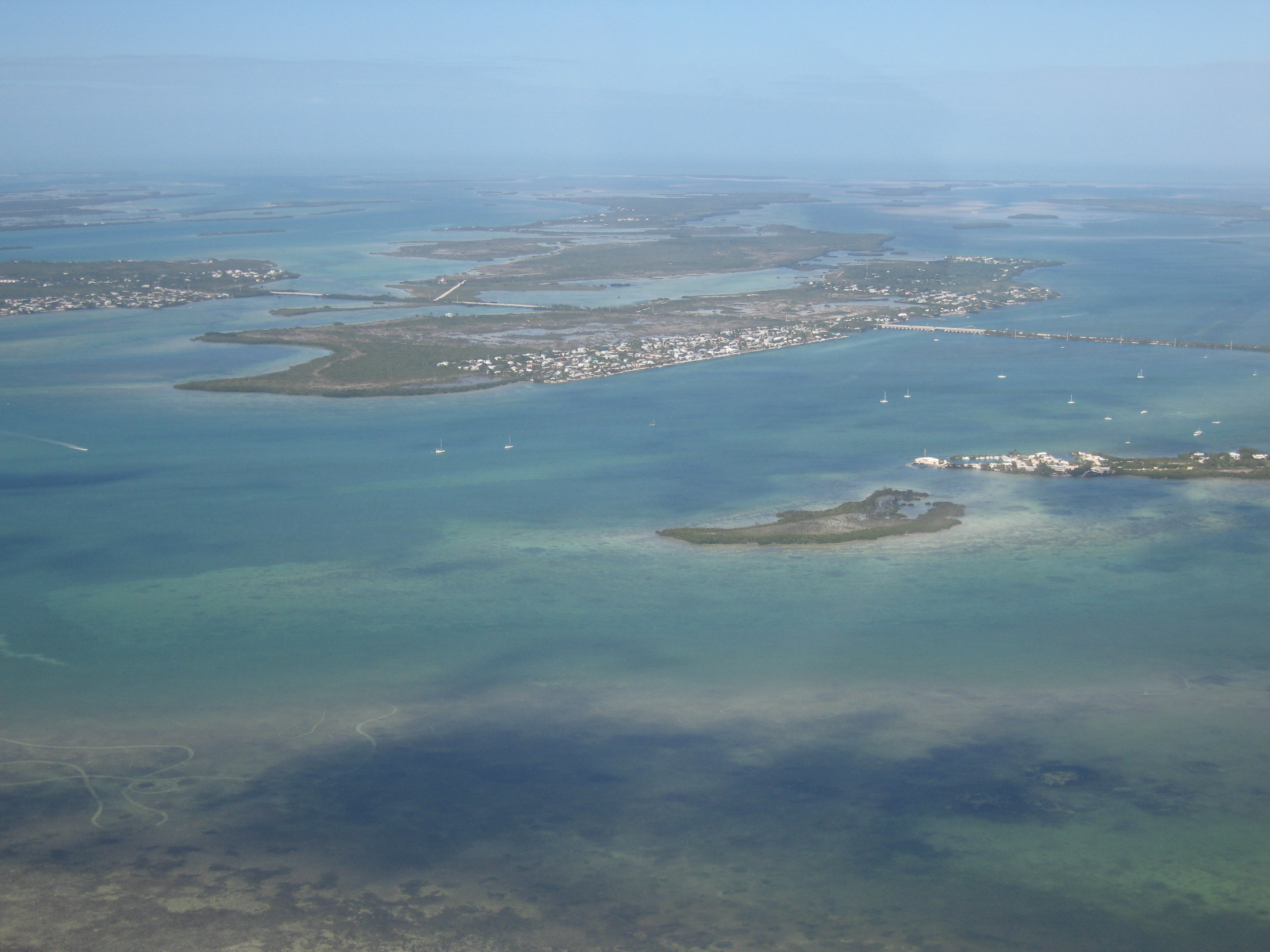
- Aerial view of Little Torch Key

- Little Torch Key Little Torch Key (the Caribbean)

Geography
- Location: Gulf of Mexico
- Coordinates: 24.66566°N 81.390603°W

Administration
- United States
- State: Florida
- County: Monroe

Little Torch Key is an island in the lower Florida Keys.

U.S. Route 1 (also known as the Overseas Highway), crosses the key at about mile markers 28–29. It is immediately preceded to the northeast by Big Pine Key, and is followed by Middle Torch Key to the southwest. Little Torch Key is a small island 24 miles (39 km) from Key West. There are a few, but not many, businesses on the island.

Like all of the keys in the Torch Keys, this key was probably named for the native torchwood tree, Amyris elemifera L. The north end of the key is the site of a former settlement which was abandoned in 1938 when the highway was relocated.

Its most likely claim to fame is as a relatively frequent fishing destination for U.S. President Harry S. Truman. A Reuters story on February 14, 2009, named a resort there as one of the "Top 10 most romantic retreats".

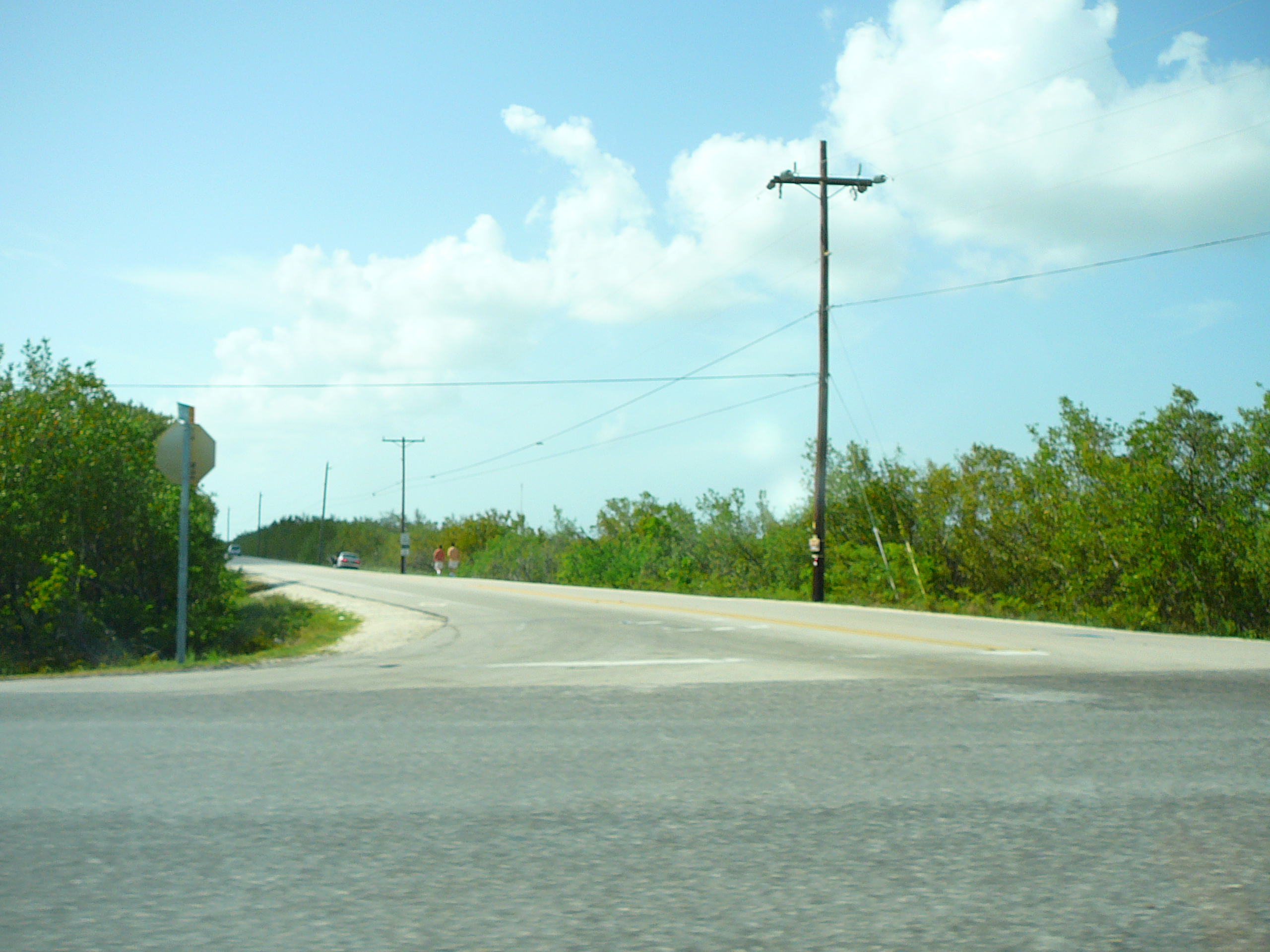
The intersection of State Road 4A with US 1 on Little Torch Key

== Etymology ==
Little Torch Key was named after the torchwood tree and is just south of Big Pine Key.
