= Cadinol =

Cadinol is any of several organic compounds with formula C_{15}H_{26}O, especially:

- α-Cadinol, or 10α-hydroxy-4-cadinene
- δ-Cadinol, also known as torreyol, sesquigoyol, pilgerol, albicaulol
- τ-Cadinol, or cédrélanol
