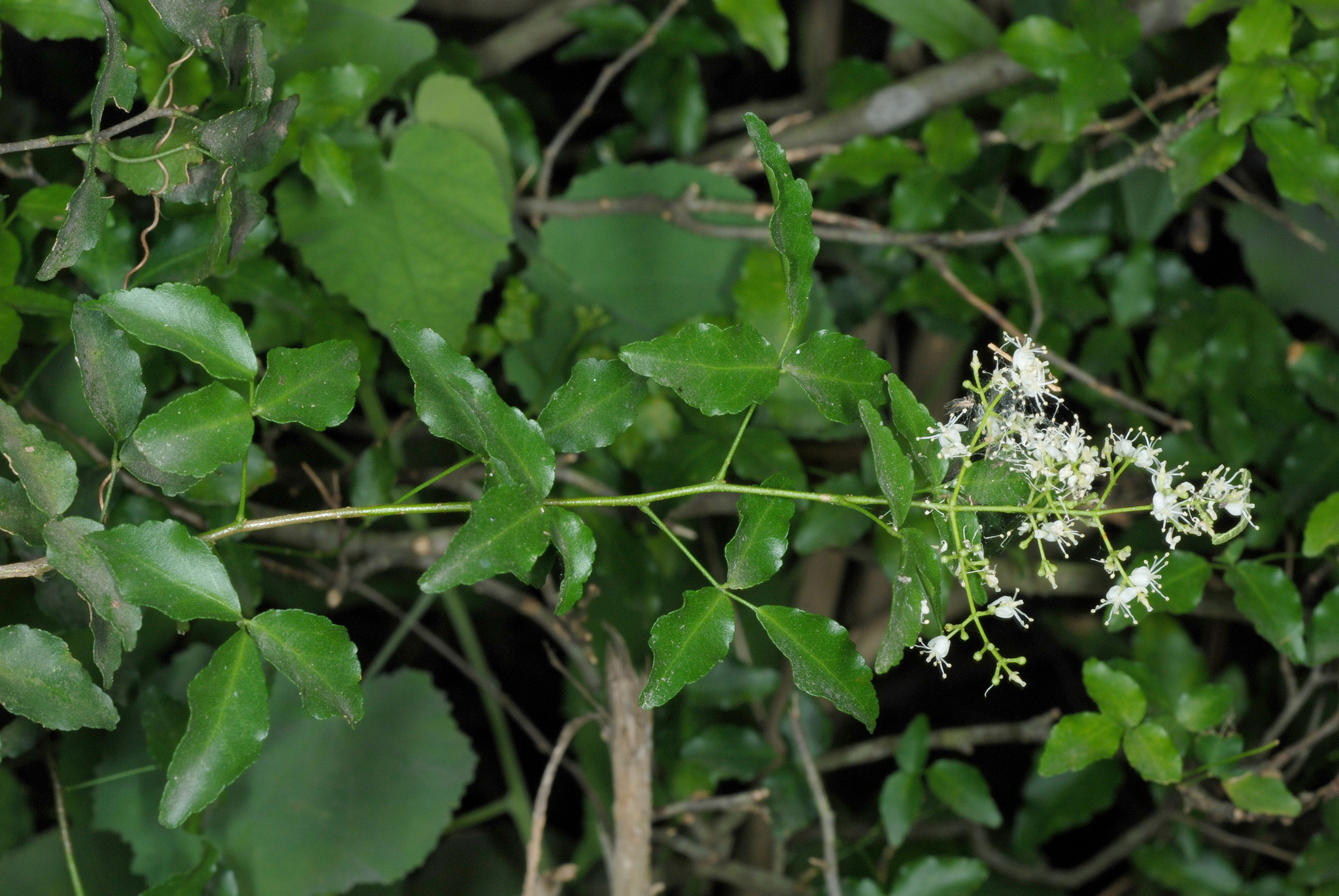
- Amyris texana

Scientific classification
- Kingdom: Plantae
- Clade: Tracheophytes
- Clade: Angiosperms
- Clade: Eudicots
- Clade: Rosids
- Order: Sapindales
- Family: Rutaceae
- Subfamily: Amyridoideae
- Genus: Amyris; P.Browne

Type species
- Amyris balsamifera L.

Species
- See text.

= Amyris =

Genus of flowering plants

Amyris is a genus of flowering plants in the citrus family, Rutaceae. The generic name is derived from the Greek word αμυρων (amyron), which means "intensely scented" and refers to the strong odor of the resin. Members of the genus are commonly known as torchwoods because of their highly flammable wood.

== Species ==
As of September 2021, Plants of the World Online accepted the following species:

- Amyris abeggii Ekman ex Urb.
- Amyris amazonica Cornejo & Kallunki
- Amyris apiculata Urb. & Ekman
- Amyris attenuata Standl.
- Amyris balsamifera L. – balsam torchwood
- Amyris barbata Lundell
- Amyris brachybotrys Turcz.
- Amyris brenesii Standl.
- Amyris carterae Rebman & F.Chiang
- Amyris centinelensis Cornejo
- Amyris chiapensis Lundell
- Amyris conzattii Standl.
- Amyris cordata I.M.Johnst.
- Amyris crebrinervis Gereau
- Amyris cubensis (Borhidi & Acuña) Beurton
- Amyris diatrypa Spreng. – hairy torchwood
- Amyris elemifera L. – sea torchwood
- Amyris filipes Lundell
- Amyris granulata Urb.
- Amyris guatemalensis Lundell
- Amyris guianensis Aubl.
- Amyris humboldtii Krug & Urb.
- Amyris ignea Steyerm.
- Amyris intermedia Urb. & Ekman
- Amyris jorgemeavei Hern.-Barón, Espejo, Pérez-García, Cerros & López-Ferr.
- Amyris karlitae W.Palacios
- Amyris lineata C.Wright ex Griseb.
- Amyris lurida Lundell
- Amyris macrocarpa Gereau
- Amyris madrensis S.Watson – mountain torchwood
- Amyris magnifolia Gómez-Laur. & Q.Jiménez
- Amyris marshii Standl.
- Amyris metopioides Zanoni & M.M.Mejía
- Amyris mexicana Lundell
- Amyris monophylla Brandegee
- Amyris multijuga Turcz.
- Amyris oblanceolata A.Pool
- Amyris pernambucensis Arruda
- Amyris phlebotaenioides Urb. & Ekman
- Amyris pinnata Kunth
- Amyris plumieri DC.
- Amyris polymorpha Urb.
- Amyris polyneura Urb.
- Amyris pungens Urb.
- Amyris purpusii P.Wilson
- Amyris rekoi S.F.Blake
- Amyris rhomboidea Standl.
- Amyris robinsonii DC.
- Amyris roseomaculata Hern.-Barón, Cerros, M.González, Espejo & López-Ferr.
- Amyris sandemanii Sandwith
- Amyris staminosa Lundell
- Amyris stromatophylla P.Wilson
- Amyris terebinthifolia Ten.
- Amyris texana (Buckley) P.Wilson – Texas torchwood, chapotillo
- Amyris thyrsiflora Turcz.
- Amyris trimera Krug & Urb.
- Amyris vestita Lundell

=== Formerly placed here ===
- Atalantia simplicifolia (Roxb.) Engl. (as A. simplicifolia Roxb.)
- Boswellia papyrifera (Delile ex Caill.) Hochst. (as A. papyrifera Delile ex Caill.)
- Bursera excelsa (as A. elegans)
- Canarium zeylanicum (Retz.) Blume (as A. zeylanica Retz.)
- Clausena anisata (Willd.) Hook.f. (as A. anisata Willd. or A. dentata Willd.)
- Clausena heptaphylla (Roxb. ex DC.) Wight & Arn. ex Steud. (as A. heptaphylla Roxb. ex DC.)
- Commiphora gileadensis (L.) C.Chr. (as A. gileadensis L. or A. opobalsamum L.)
- Commiphora kataf (Forssk.) Engl. (as A. kataf Forssk.)
- Metopium toxiferum (L.) Krug & Urb. (as A. toxifera L.)
- Schinus polygama (Cav.) Cabrera (as A. polygama Cav.)

== Uses ==
The trunks of Amyris species exude elemi, a type of balsam (oleoresin) that contains elemic acids, liquid sesquiterpenes, and triterpenes such as α- and β-amyrin among other components. It is used medicinally and in lacquers. The wood is often used for torches and firewood. Its high resin content causes it to burn brightly, and it will burn well even when green. In addition, the wood is hard, heavy, close-grained, can take a high polish, and repels dry wood termites. Essential oils containing caryophyllene, cadinene, and cadinol are extracted from A. balsamifera and A. elemifera. These are used in varnishes, perfumes, medicines, cosmetics, soaps, and incense.

Chemical compounds known as chromenylated amides isolated from Amyris plumieri have shown some inhibition of the cytochrome P450 enzymes.
