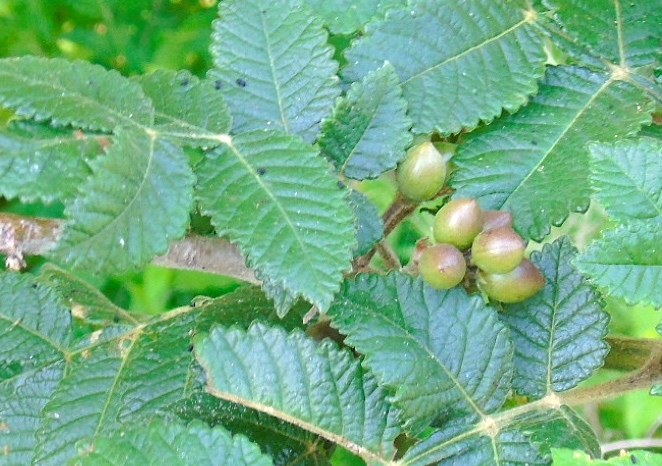

Conservation status
- Least Concern (IUCN 3.1)

Scientific classification
- Kingdom: Plantae
- Clade: Embryophytes
- Clade: Tracheophytes
- Clade: Spermatophytes
- Clade: Angiosperms
- Clade: Eudicots
- Clade: Rosids
- Order: Sapindales
- Family: Burseraceae
- Genus: Bursera
- Species: B. excelsa

Binomial name
- Bursera excelsa (Kunth) Engl.

Synonyms
- Amyris elegans Willd. ex Engl.; Bursera acutidens Sprague & L.Riley; Bursera excelsa var. acutidens (Sprague & Ridl.) McVaugh & Rzed.; Bursera excelsa var. favionalis McVaugh & Rzed.; Bursera excelsa var. favonialis McVaugh & Rzed.; Bursera sphaerocarpa Sprague & L.Riley; Elaphrium excelsum Kunth

= Bursera excelsa =

Species of plant

Bursera excelsa, the copal, is a species of plant found along the Pacific coast of Mexico.
