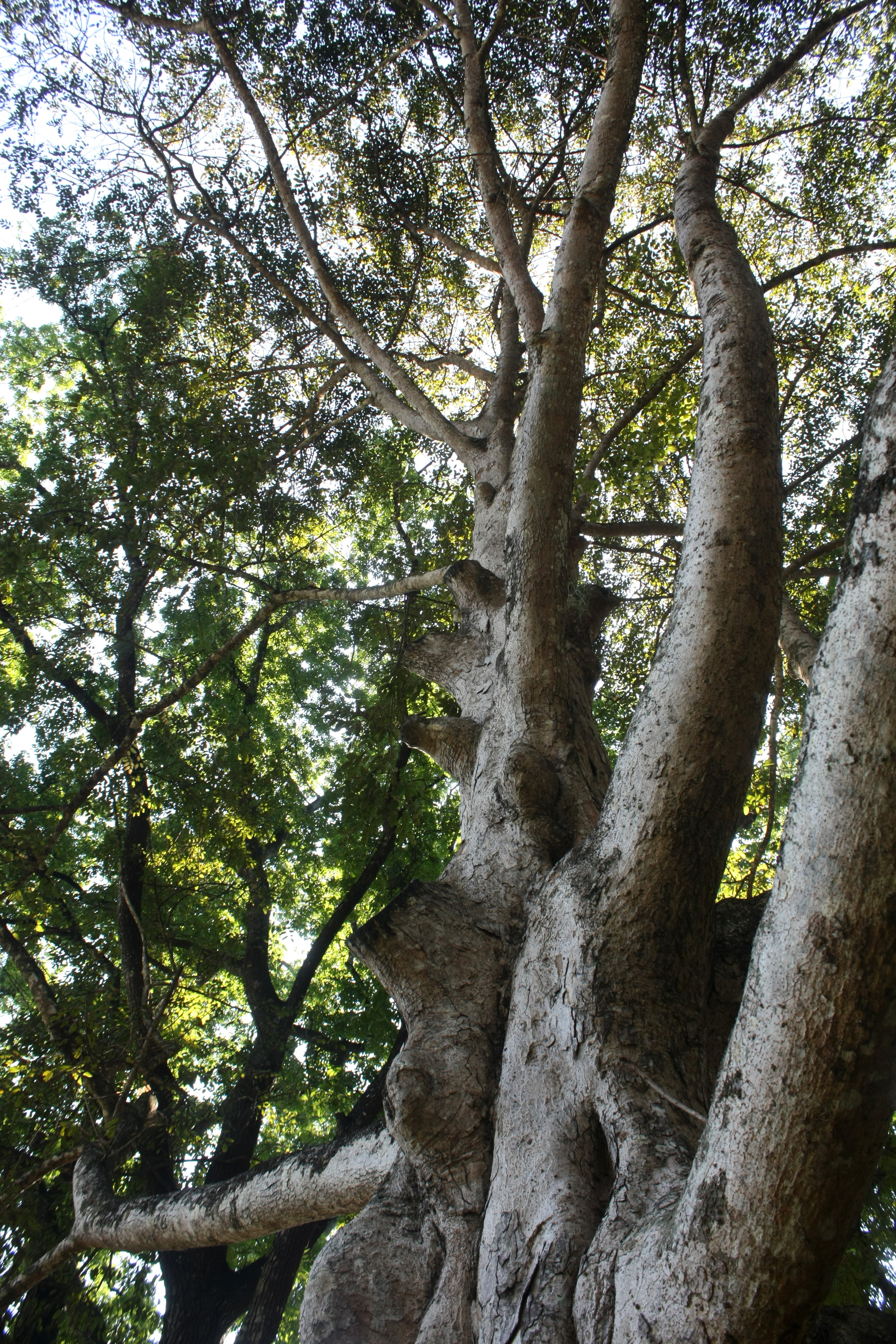

Conservation status
- Vulnerable (IUCN 2.3)

Scientific classification
- Kingdom: Plantae
- Clade: Tracheophytes
- Clade: Angiosperms
- Clade: Eudicots
- Clade: Rosids
- Order: Sapindales
- Family: Burseraceae
- Genus: Canarium
- Species: C. zeylanicum

Binomial name
- Canarium zeylanicum (Retz.) Blume, 1850

Synonyms
- Amyris zeylanica Retz.

= Canarium zeylanicum =

Species of flowering plant

Canarium zeylanicum is a species of flowering plant in the frankincense family, Burseraceae, that is endemic to Sri Lanka. Canarium zeylanicum is a large branched tree that can grow up to 25–30m in height. The seeds of this plant are large, oval, and they can be eaten. This plant can be seen with fruits and flowers in the months of April to September. The oil of the seeds of Canarium zeylanicum are edible and this oil has been used by Sri Lankans for medicinal purposes and for food for ages. However, these uses of the plant are confined to its rural population and even then, they mostly use it for traditional medicinal purposes. Over 95% of the seeds produced and harvested from these plants are thrown away, wasting its source of valuable, natural, and nutritional value.

== Culture ==
Known as කැකුණ (kekuna) in Sinhala.
