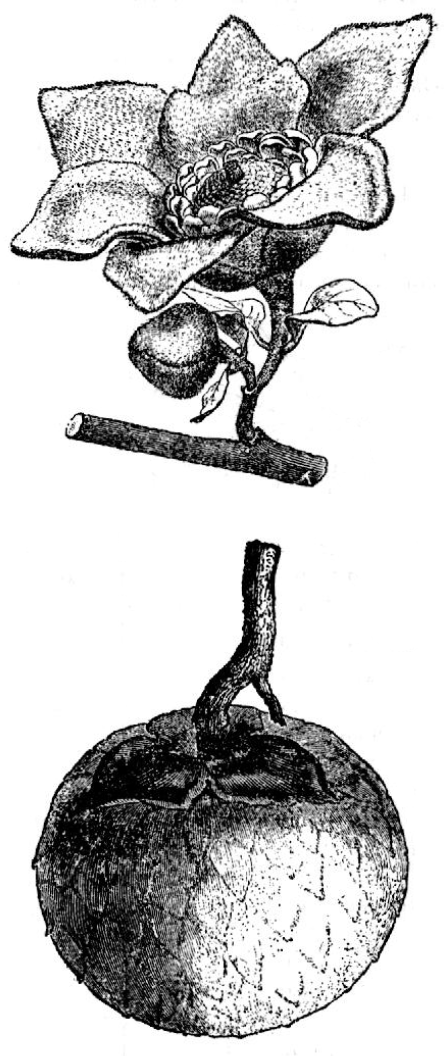
- Illustration of Fusaea longifolia specie

Scientific classification
- Kingdom: Plantae
- Clade: Embryophytes
- Clade: Tracheophytes
- Clade: Spermatophytes
- Clade: Angiosperms
- Clade: Magnoliids
- Order: Magnoliales
- Family: Annonaceae
- Genus: Fusaea (Baill.) Saff.

= Fusaea =

Genus of plants in the soursop family

Fusaea is a genus of flowering plants in the family Annonaceae. It comprises two species distributed in Brazil, Colombia, Ecuador, French Guiana, Guyana, Peru, Suriname and Venezuela.

== Description ==
Fusaea are shrubs or trees. Their flowers have a three-lobed calyx that can be separated or almost united. Their petals are large and covered it silky hairs. They have an outer row of sterile stamens and fertile inner stamens. Their leaves are alternate and have smooth margins. Their fruit are round and smooth and formed from multiple fused carpels. The fruit has pulpy flesh.

== Species ==
Two species are accepted:

- Fusaea longifolia (Aubl.) Saff. (synonym Fusaea decurrens R.E.Fr.)
- Fusaea peruviana R.E.Fr.
