= Fusaea peruviana =

Conservation status
- Least Concern (IUCN 3.1)

Scientific classification
- Kingdom: Plantae
- Clade: Embryophytes
- Clade: Tracheophytes
- Clade: Spermatophytes
- Clade: Angiosperms
- Clade: Magnoliids
- Order: Magnoliales
- Family: Annonaceae
- Genus: Fusaea
- Species: F. peruviana

Binomial name
- Fusaea peruviana R.E.Fr.

Species of plant

Fusaea peruviana is a species of plant in the family Annonaceae. It is native to Brazil, Colombia, Ecuador and Peru. Robert Elias Fries, the Swedish botanist who first formally described the species, named it after Peru where the specimen he examined was found near the Huallaga River and the city of Yurimaguas.

== Description ==
It is a tree reaching 15 meters in height and 15 centimeters in diameter. Its petioles are 3–8 by 2–4.5 millimeters and covered in 0.8 millimeter, gold-colored hairs. Its papery, oblong to oval leaves are 10–40 by 3–14 centimeters and come to tapering point that is up to 5 centimeters long. Its leaves. have 10–20 secondary veins emanating from either side of their midribs. The secondary veins emerge from the midrib at an angle of 50°-75°. Its inflorescences consist of 1–5 by 3–4 millimeter peduncles with 1–3 flowers. The inflorescences are in internodes. The peduncles are covered in white to yellow hairs up to 1.2 millimeters long. Each flower is on a 14–22 by 2–7 millimeter pedicel covered in white to yellow hairs that are up to 1.2 millimeters long. Its creamy white flowers have 3 oval to triangular sepals that are 1–1.3 by 1.3–1.6 centimeters, with tips that come to a point. The outer surface of the sepals are sparsely to densely covered in white to yellow hairs, while their inner surface is hairless. Its flowers have 6 petals in two rows of 3. The outer petals are fused over the bottom 1/3 of their length and are 24–35 by 8–13 millimeters. The inner petals are 2–4 by 1.5–2 centimeters with tips that come to a point. The outer surfaces of the petals are covered in white to yellow hairs up to 1.2 millimeters long, while the hairs on the inner surfaces are up to 0.5 millimeters long, except the lower 1/3 which is hairless. Its flowers have numerous stamens. The roughly 40 oblong to oval outer stamens have a petal-like appearance and are 3.5–5 by 1.5–2 millimeters. The 200–300 inner stamens are yellow, and 2.5–3.5 millimeters long. Its flowers have 30–100 carpels situated in a concave receptacle. Its ovaries are 2–2.5 millimeters long. Its styles are2-2.5 millimeters. Its green to whitish fruit are 5–8 centimeters in diameter, and covered in 2–5 millimeter long projections. Its reddish brown, oval seeds are 14–22 by 7–8 millimeters.

=== Reproductive biology ===
The pollen of F. peruviana is shed as permanent tetrads.

=== Habitat and distribution ===
It has been observed growing in forest habitat with sandy or laterite soil, at elevations of 100–300 meters.

=== Uses ===
Its wood is used in the construction of houses in Peru.
