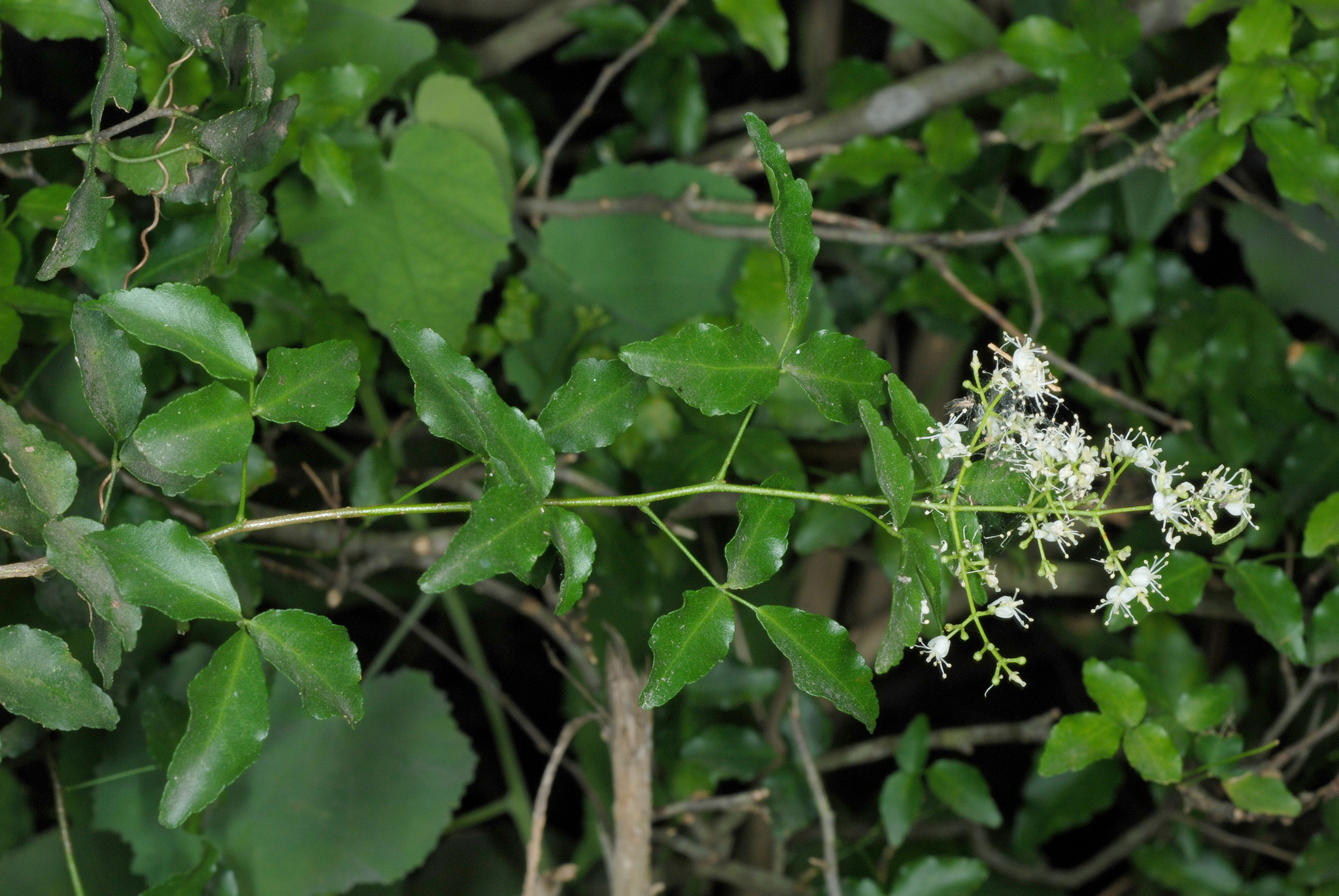

Conservation status
- Least Concern (IUCN 3.1)

- Apparently Secure (NatureServe)

Scientific classification
- Kingdom: Plantae
- Clade: Tracheophytes
- Clade: Angiosperms
- Clade: Eudicots
- Clade: Rosids
- Order: Sapindales
- Family: Rutaceae
- Genus: Amyris
- Species: A. texana

Binomial name
- Amyris texana (Buckley) P.Wilson

Synonyms
- Amyris parvifolia A. Gray, 1888; Zanthoxylum texanum Buckley, 1883

= Amyris texana =

Species of flowering plant

Amyris texana, commonly known as the Texas torchwood or chapotillo, is a species of flowering plant in the rue family, Rutaceae. It is native to southern Texas and northeastern Mexico.

== Taxonomy ==
Texas torchwood was first described by Samuel Botsford Buckley in 1883 based on a specimen he collected in April 1882 near Corpus Christi, Texas. It was initially described as Zanthoxylum texanum, but Buckley later moved it to genus Amyris.

== Description ==
It is a perennial shrub, growing to a height of 4 to 6 ft (1.2 to 1.8 m) and roughly the same width. The evergreen leaves are compound, with three pairs of dark green, shiny leaflets. Leaves and other parts of the plant have an earthy, citrus smell, particularly when broken or crushed. Small, cream-colored flowers grow on racemes and bloom from March until October or November. Dark purple fruits form when the flowers have been pollinated, each containing one seed. The bark is mottled and lacks thorns. It is able to tolerate drought and short-term exposure to freezing temperatures.

== Distribution and habitat ==
It is found in the Tamaulipan mezquital ecoregion. In Mexico, it is abundant in Coahuila, Nuevo León, San Luis Potosí, and Tamaulipas. It occurs in the United States only in south Texas. It is found in subtropical or tropical coastal thickets, chaparral, brush, and mesic forest understory at altitudes ranging from sea level to about 5,900 ft (1,800 m).

== Ecology ==
Texas torchwood attracts hummingbirds, butterflies, moths, bees, and other pollinators. The fruits are eaten by birds, lizards, and other wildlife. Giant swallowtail butterflies (Papilio rumiko) lay their eggs on the young leaves of Texas torchwood and other Rutaceae species.

== Gallery ==
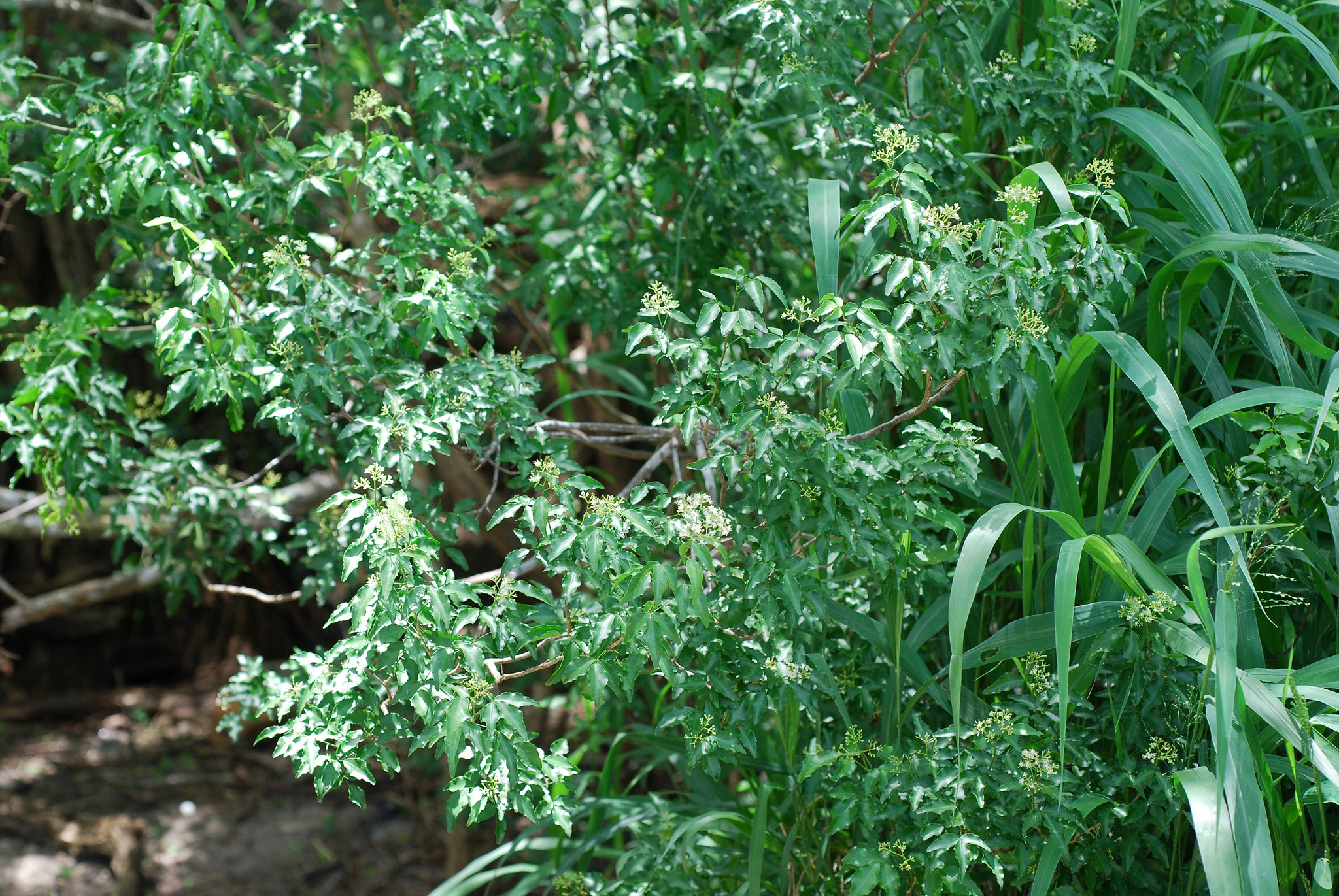
Texas torchwood (Amyris texana) observed in Hidalgo County, Texas. Photo by Douglas Goldman.

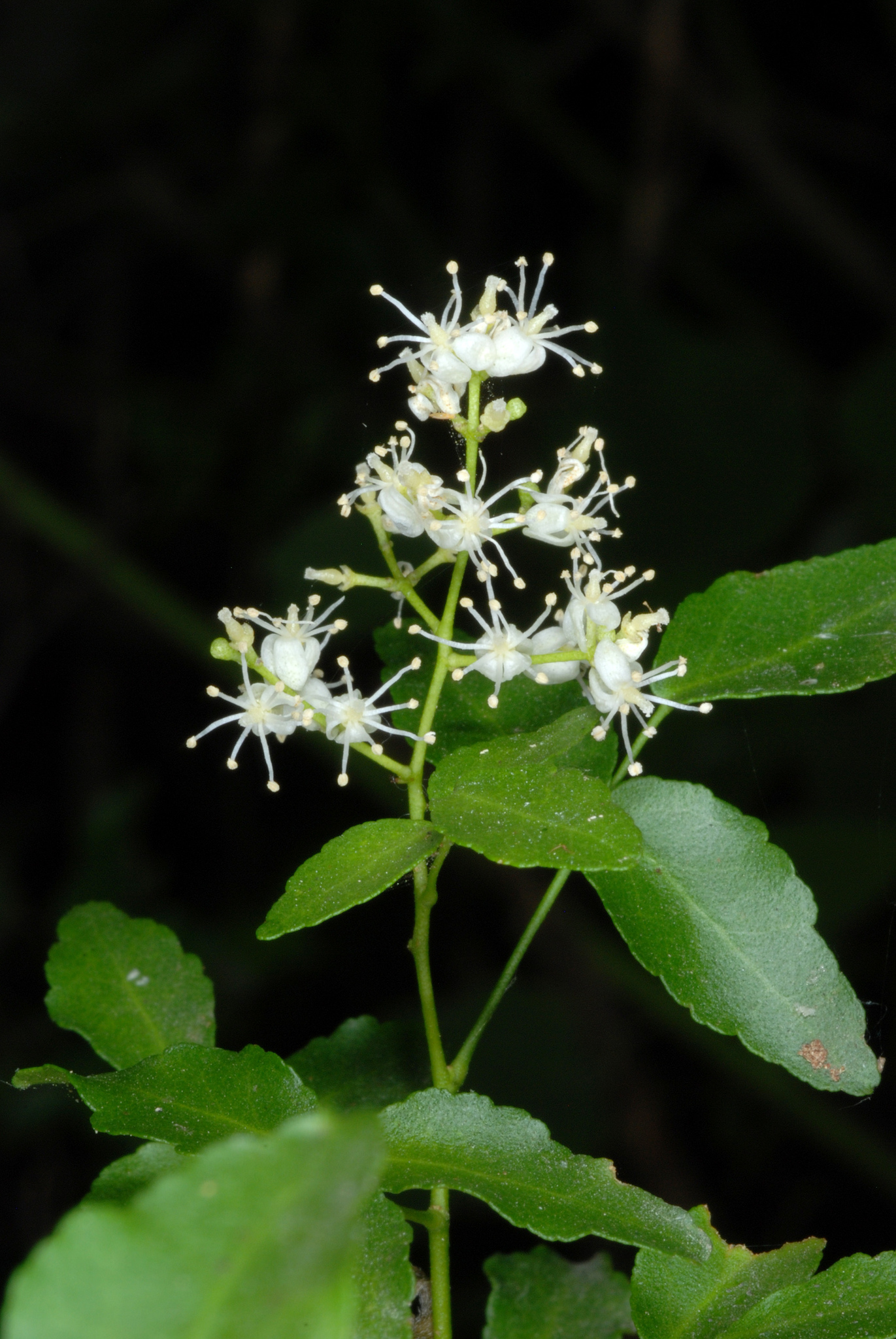
Texas torchwood (Amyris texana) observed in Hidalgo County, Texas. Photo by Douglas Goldman.

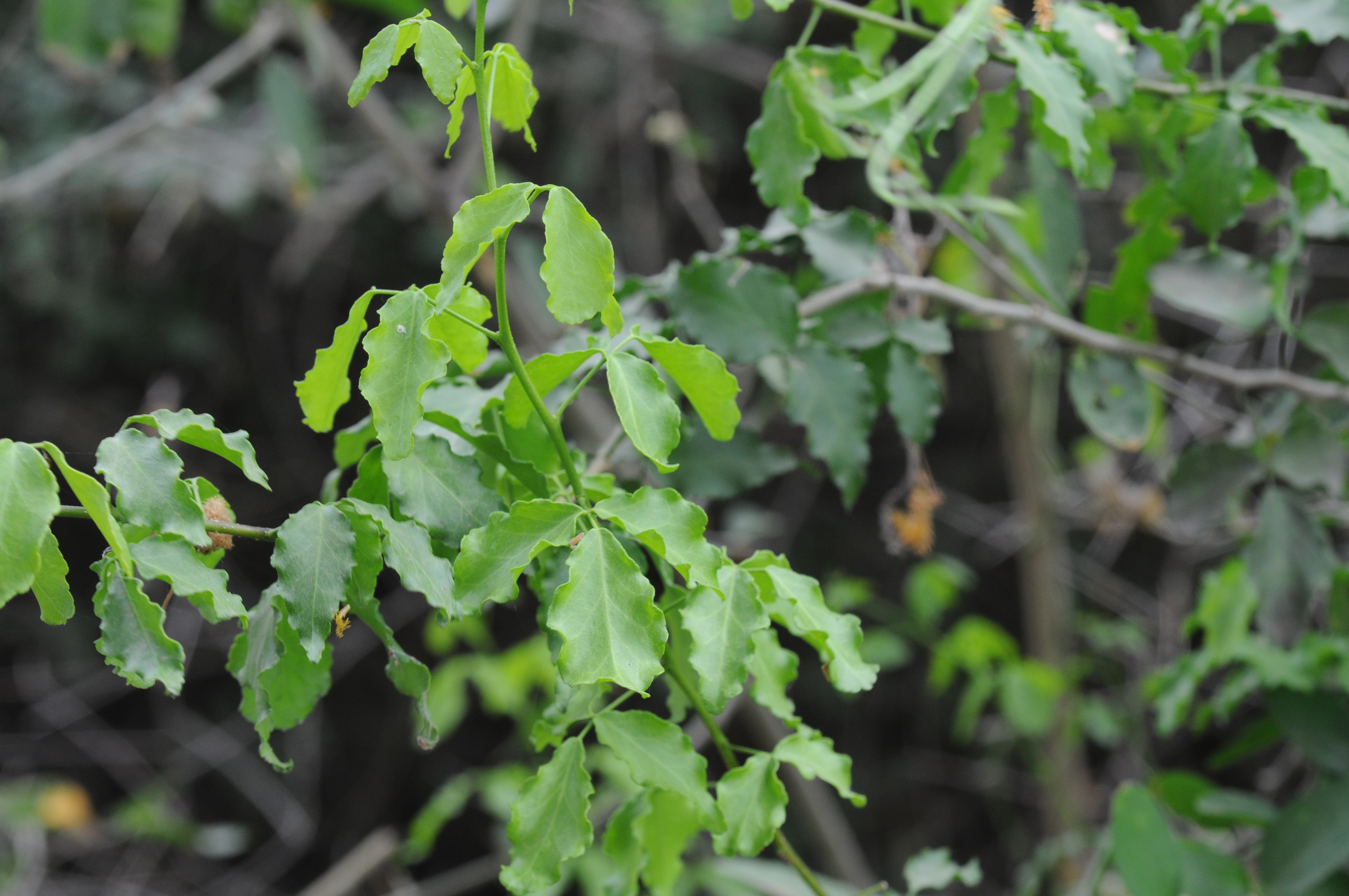
Texas torchwood (Amyris texana), Bentsen-Rio Grande Valley State Park, Mission, Hidalgo County, March 2023.

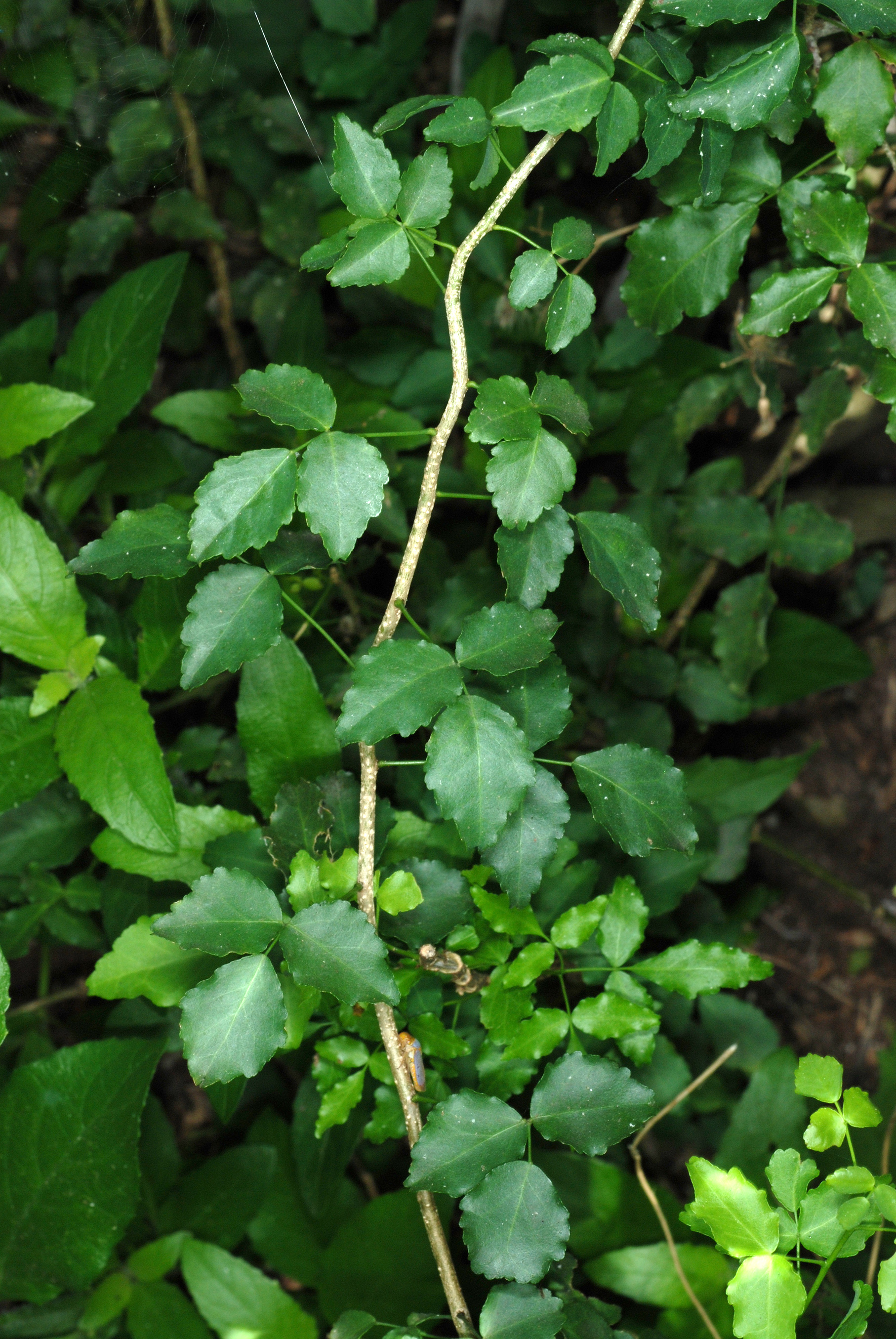
Texas torchwood (Amyris texana) observed in Hidalgo County, Texas. Photo by Douglas Goldman.
