= Ramrod Key =

Island in the lower Florida Keys, United States

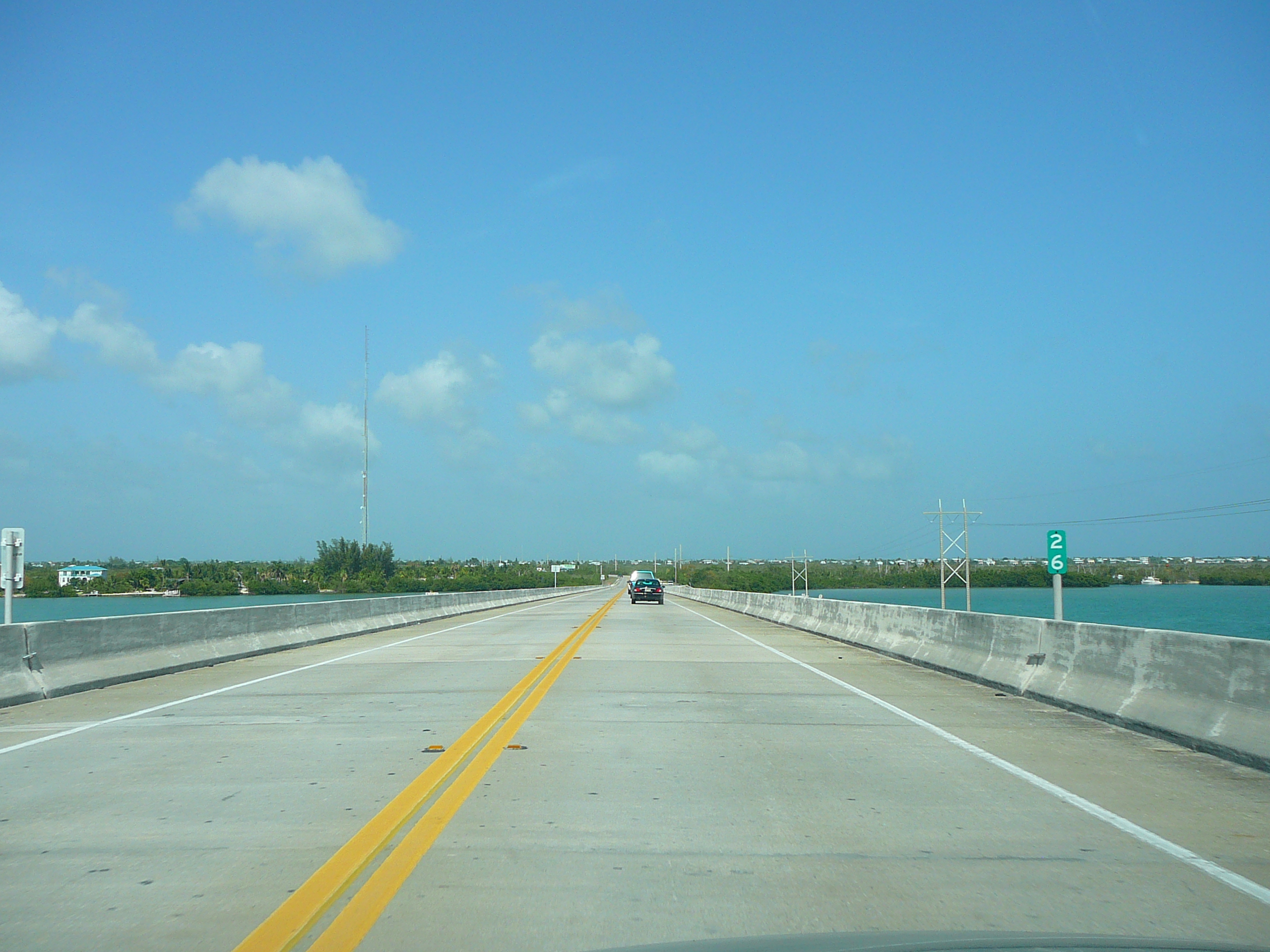
- The west side of Ramrod Key as seen from the Niles Channel Bridge

- Ramrod Key Ramrod Key (the Caribbean)

Geography
- Location: Gulf of Mexico
- Coordinates: 24.6568°N 81.4132°W

Administration
- United States
- State: Florida
- County: Monroe

Ramrod Key is an island in the lower Florida Keys. Originally named Roberts Island, Ramrod Key was renamed for a ship named Ramrod, which was wrecked on a reef south of there in the early nineteenth century.

== Description ==
Until the construction of U.S. Route 1 in the 1920s, the only building on Ramrod was a post office that was alongside the train tracks. U.S. 1 (or the Overseas Highway) crosses Ramrod Key at approximately mile markers 26–27.5, between Summerland Key and Middle Torch Key.

Ramrod Key is a popular tourist site due to the short distance between the island and Looe Key. Current (2014) commercial enterprises of visitor interest include a dive shop-hotel-bar/restaurant complex, numerous sport fishing charters, a bar/restaurant and miniature golf complex, a gas station-grocery, and a Cuban deli/grocery.
