= Amyris polymorpha =

Conservation status
- Vulnerable (IUCN 2.3)

Scientific classification
- Kingdom: Plantae
- Clade: Tracheophytes
- Clade: Angiosperms
- Clade: Eudicots
- Clade: Rosids
- Order: Sapindales
- Family: Rutaceae
- Genus: Amyris
- Species: A. polymorpha

Binomial name
- Amyris polymorpha Urb., 1925

Species of flowering plant

Amyris polymorpha is a species of flowering plant in the citrus family, Rutaceae, that is endemic to Cuba.
