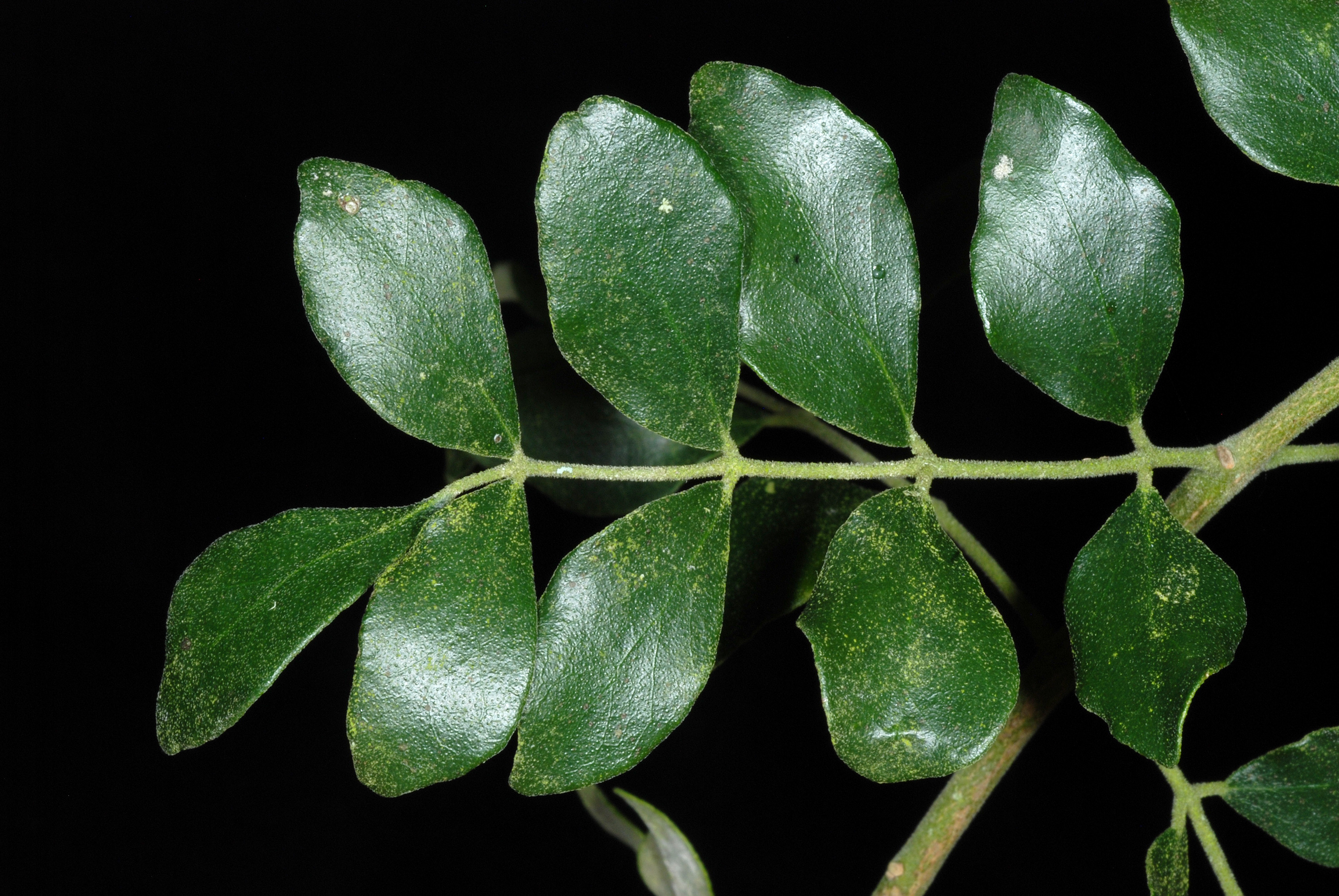
- Foliage
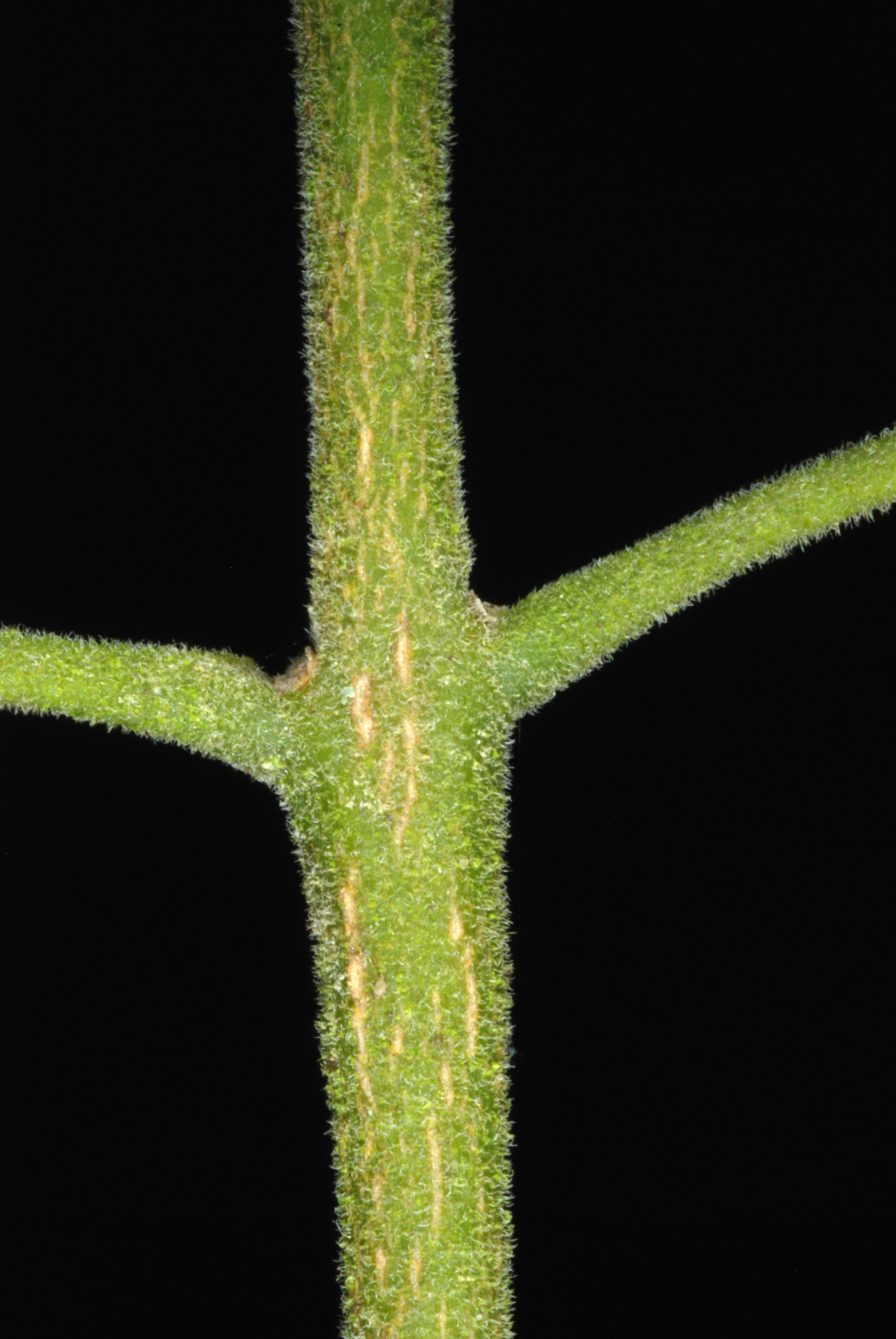
- Stem

Conservation status
- Least Concern (IUCN 3.1)

Scientific classification
- Kingdom: Plantae
- Clade: Tracheophytes
- Clade: Angiosperms
- Clade: Eudicots
- Clade: Rosids
- Order: Sapindales
- Family: Rutaceae
- Genus: Amyris
- Species: A. madrensis

Binomial name
- Amyris madrensis S.Watson

= Amyris madrensis =

Species of plant

Amyris madrensis, the Sierra Madre torchwood, is a species of flowering plant in the family Rutaceae. It is native to southern Texas and northeastern Mexico, with scattered populations elsewhere in Mexico. A perennial shrub reaching 3 m (10 ft) but usually shorter, it is a member of the Tamaulipan thornscrub community.
