= Junenol =

Chemical compound

Identifiers
- IUPAC name: (1S,2S,4aR,8aS)-2-isopropyl-4a-methyl-8-methylene-decalin-1-ol
- CAS Number: 472-07-1
- PubChem CID: 6452077
- ChemSpider: 4954519
- UNII: Z3209PC5TC
- CompTox Dashboard (EPA): DTXSID60963763

Chemical and physical data
- Formula: C_{15}H_{26}O
- Molar mass: 222.372 g·mol^{−1}
- 3D model (JSmol): Interactive image
- SMILES: CC(C)[C@@H]1CC[C@]2(CCCC(=C)[C@@H]2[C@H]1O)C
- InChI: InChI=InChI=1S/C15H26O/c1-10(2)12-7-9-15(4)8-5-6-11(3)13(15)14(12)16/h10,12-14,16H,3,5-9H2,1-2,4H3/t12-,13+,14-,15+/m0/s1; Key:MSJJKJCIFIGTJY-LJISPDSOSA-N

Junenol is a sesquiterpene alcohol that has garnered interest in the field of natural product chemistry and essential oil research. This compound, along with its isomers like 10-epi-junenol, has been identified in various plant species and is known for its potential biological activities.

Junenol and its derivatives have been subjects of synthetic studies, with researchers developing efficient routes for their preparation from natural precursors. The presence of junenol and related compounds in essential oils contributes to the chemical variability observed in plant species, influencing their aromatic profiles and potential applications. As a sesquiterpene, junenol plays a role in the complex mixture of volatile organic compounds found in essential oils, which are known for their diverse biological activities.
