= Middle Torch Key =

Island in the lower Florida Keys, United States

- Middle Torch Key Middle Torch Key (the Caribbean)

Geography
- Location: Gulf of Mexico
- Coordinates: 24.684886°N 81.40794°W

Administration
- United States
- State: Florida
- County: Monroe

Middle Torch Key is an island in the lower Florida Keys.

It is located between Ramrod Key and Little Torch Key.

The southernmost tip of the key is on U.S. 1 (or the Overseas Highway), at approximately mile marker 28.

Like the other Torch Keys, it was probably named for the native Torchwood tree.

== Flora and fauna ==
The Florida Keys mole skink has been seen on Middle Torch Key and other Florida Keys, although it is rarely seen.
