= Δ-Cadinol =

δ-Cadinol

Names
- IUPAC name (1S,4S)-1,6-Dimethyl-4-propan-2-yl-3,4,4a,7,8,8a-hexahydro-2H-naphthalen-1-ol
- Other names Torreyol; 1-epi-α-Cadinol; 1β-Cadin-4-en-10-ol

Identifiers
CAS Number	19435-97-3
3D model (JSmol)	Interactive image
ChEBI	CHEBI:156223
ChemSpider	2341398
PubChem CID	3084311
CompTox Dashboard (EPA)	DTXSID00173061
- InChI: InChI=1S/C15H26O/c1-10(2)12-7-8-15(4,16)14-6-5-11(3)9-13(12)14/h9-10,12-14,16H,5-8H2,1-4H3/t12-,13-,14-,15+/m0/s1 Key: LHYHMMRYTDARSZ-ZQDZILKHSA-N; InChI=1/C15H26O/c1-10(2)12-7-8-15(4,16)14-6-5-11(3)9-13(12)14/h9-10,12-14,16H,5-8H2,1-4H3/t12-,13-,14-,15+/m0/s1 Key: LHYHMMRYTDARSZ-ZQDZILKHBP
- SMILES: CC1=C[C@]2([H])[C@@](CC1)([H])[C@](C)(O)CC[C@H]2C(C)C

Properties
Chemical formula	C_{15}H_{26}O
Molar mass	222.37 g/mol
Appearance	White crystalline needles
Melting point	138 to 139 °C (280 to 282 °F; 411 to 412 K)
- Except where otherwise noted, data are given for materials in their standard state (at 25 °C [77 °F], 100 kPa). Infobox references

δ-Cadinol is an organic compound, a sesquiterpenoid alcohol produced by many plants as well as some animals and microorganisms. It is a white crystalline solid, soluble in isopropyl ether and ethanol. It is an epimer of α-cadinol.

δ-Cadinol exists in nature as either of two enantiomers distinguished by the prefixes (+)- and (−)-. The (+)-isomer was identified by E. Shinozaki in 1922 from the leaves of Torreya nucifera and originally named torreyol. The (−)-isomer was isolated in 1951 by Haagen-Smit and others from Pinus albicaulus and first called albicaulol. Its structure was determined in 1970 by Lars Westfelt. Other names were given to δ-cadinol based on its various biological sources before the structures were confirmed, including sesquigoyol for (+)-δ-cadinol and pilgerol for (−)-δ-cadinol. Lambertol is thought to be either (+)-δ-cadinol or (−)-δ-cadinol. Cedrelanol was originally thought to be identical to (−)-δ-cadinol but was later confirmed to have the structure of τ-cadinol.

== Occurrence ==
δ-Cadinol is produced by the fungus Xylobolus frustulatus as long white needles when grown in malt agar medium. It also occurs in many conifers, and in many other organisms including

- Achillea millefolium (6%)
- Cedrela odorata
- Clitocybe illudens (a mushroom)
- Copaifera multijuga (1%; a major contributor to the aroma of copaiba oil)
- Dictyopteris divaricata (a brown alga)
- Plebejus argyrognomon (a butterfly; acts as a pheromone)

== See also ==
- α-Cadinol
- τ-Cadinol
