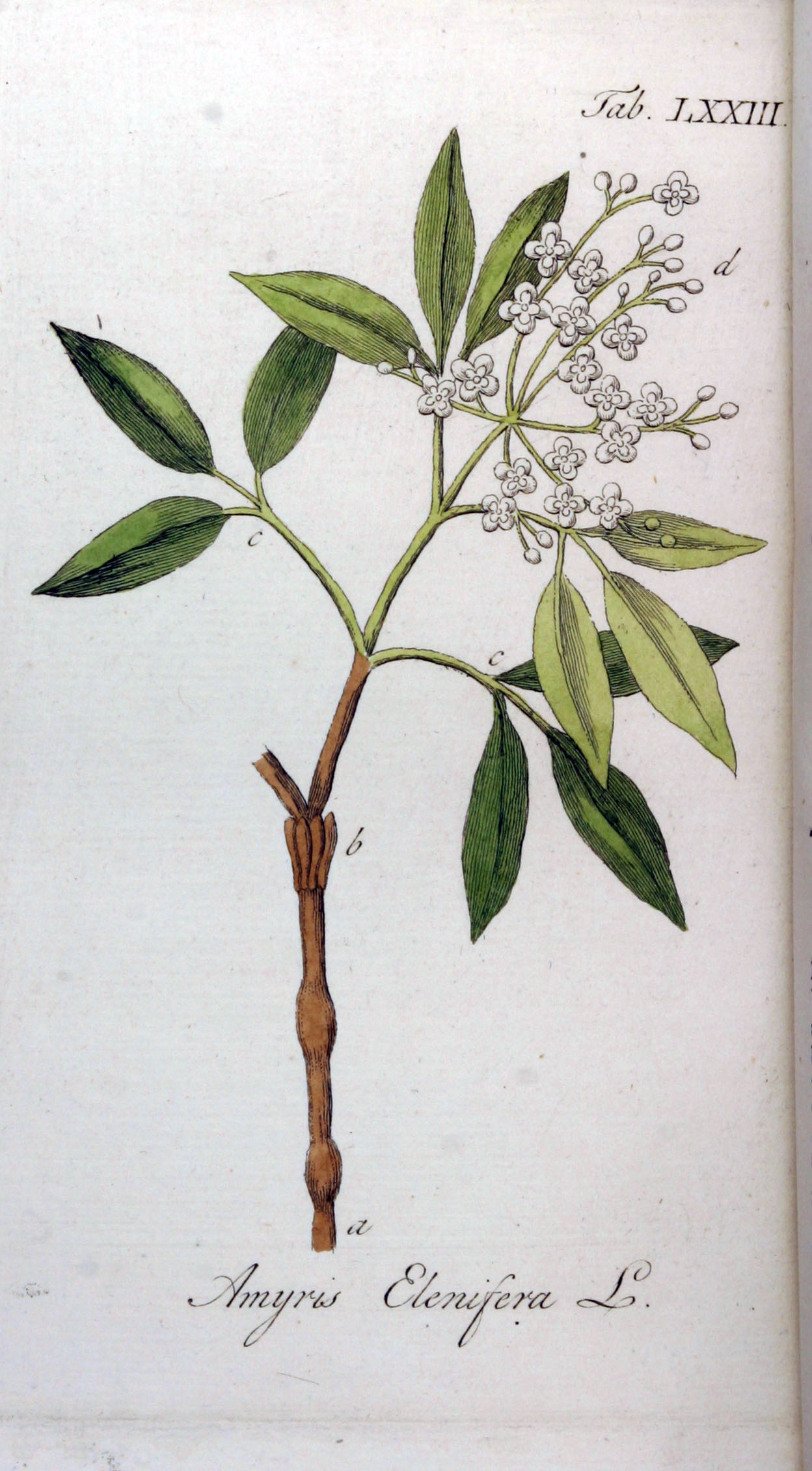

Conservation status
- Least Concern (IUCN 3.1)

- Secure (NatureServe)

Scientific classification
- Kingdom: Plantae
- Clade: Tracheophytes
- Clade: Angiosperms
- Clade: Eudicots
- Clade: Rosids
- Order: Sapindales
- Family: Rutaceae
- Genus: Amyris
- Species: A. elemifera

Binomial name
- Amyris elemifera L.

= Amyris elemifera =

Species of tree

Amyris elemifera is an evergreen species of flowering plant in the citrus family, Rutaceae, commonly named sea torchwood, smooth torchwood, candlewood, sea amyris, tea, cuabilla, and bois chandelle. It is native to Florida in the United States, the Caribbean, and the Central American countries of Guatemala, Belize, Honduras, and El Salvador. It is also known from northern South America. The species name elemifera is from the Greek, meaning "resin bearing".

== Description ==
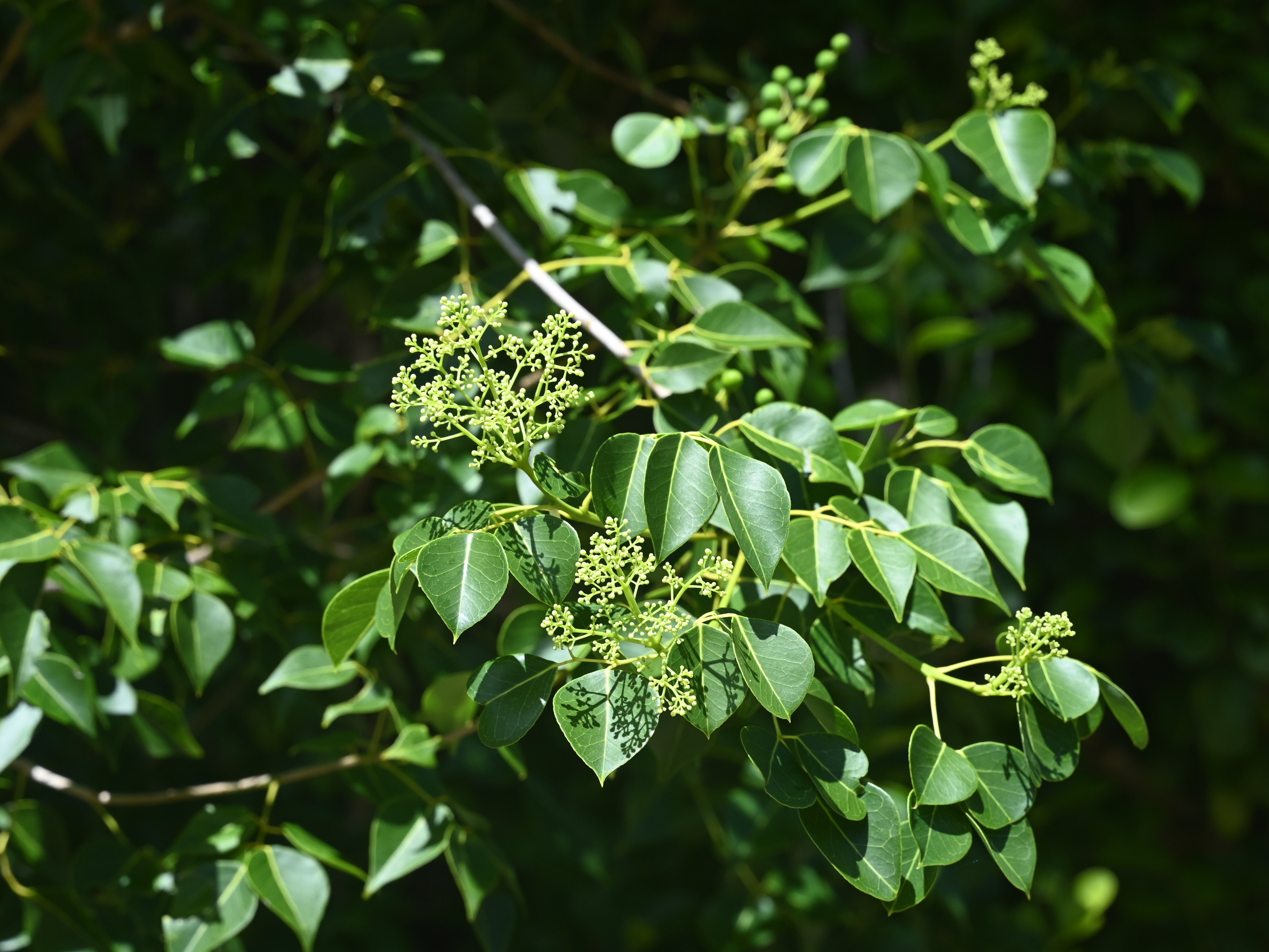
Amyris elemifera on Guadeloupe

Sea torchwood attains a maximum average height of 4 to 12 metres (13 to 39 ft), but ranges up to 50 ft (15 m) in ideal conditions. The smooth, gray bark matures into a rough and furrowed surface with plates. The wood is close-grained. The species has a vertical branching habit. It has a weak taproot, but the lateral roots are stiff and strong. The yellow-gray twigs turn gray with age. The hanging foliage is fragrant. The compound leaves are opposite or sub-opposite. A 3 cm (1.2 in) petiole supports three to five oval or lance-shaped leaflets.

== Ecology ==
Sea torchwood tolerates full sun to light shade, preferring many soil types in well-drained sites, but thrives on 750 to 2,000 mm (29.53 to 78.74 in) of yearly precipitation in Puerto Rico. It often grows in soil over rock and coastal sand, occupying hammock edges in Florida. Young plants linger in the understory until gaps allow further growth.

== Uses ==
This species has been used for fences, fuel, and honey production. The fine-grained, fragrant wood is resistant to dry wood termites. It is too scarce for common use. The plant has yielded taxaline, an oxazole with antibiotic activity against Mycobacterium. The fragrant, globose drupe is black and contains a single brown seed. The tiny, fragrant white flowers and fruit attract wildlife such as birds. In Florida, sea torchwood is a food source for the endangered Schaus' Swallowtail (Papilio aristodemus ponceanus). Contrary to popular belief and unlike the implication of its name, sea torchwood possesses minimal tolerance to salinity.
