= Α-Cadinol =

α-Cadinol

Names
- IUPAC name Cadin-4-en-10-ol
- Systematic IUPAC name (1R,4S,4aR,8aR)-1,6-Dimethyl-4-propan-2-yl-3,4,4a,7,8,8a-hexahydro-2H-naphthalen-1-ol

Identifiers
CAS Number	481-34-5
3D model (JSmol)	Interactive image
ChEBI	CHEBI:132905
ChemSpider	8574094
PubChem CID	10398656
UNII	DC0YJ4816P
CompTox Dashboard (EPA)	DTXSID701017679
- InChI: InChI=1S/C15H26O/c1-10(2)12-7-8-15(4,16)14-6-5-11(3)9-13(12)14/h9-10,12-14,16H,5-8H2,1-4H3/t12-,13-,14+,15+/m0/s1 Key: LHYHMMRYTDARSZ-BYNSBNAKSA-N; InChI=1/C15H26O/c1-10(2)12-7-8-15(4,16)14-6-5-11(3)9-13(12)14/h9-10,12-14,16H,5-8H2,1-4H3/t12-,13-,14+,15+/m0/s1 Key: LHYHMMRYTDARSZ-BYNSBNAKBA
- SMILES: CC1=C[C@H]2[C@@H](CC[C@@]([C@@H]2CC1)(C)O)C(C)C

Properties
Chemical formula	C_{15}H_{26}O
Molar mass	222.37 g/mol
Appearance	white crystalline
Melting point	73 to 74 °C (163 to 165 °F; 346 to 347 K)
- Except where otherwise noted, data are given for materials in their standard state (at 25 °C [77 °F], 100 kPa). Infobox references

α-Cadinol or 10α-hydroxy-4-cadinene is an organic compound, a sesquiterpenoid alcohol.

== Natural occurrence ==
This compound is found in essential oils and extracts of many plants, such as

- Agrotaxis selaginoides,
- Tabernaemontana catharinensis
- Litsea acutivena (7.7%),
- Salvia aratocensis (20%),
- Protium giganteum (7%),
- Uvaria ovata root bark (13–24%),
- Plinia trunciflora (19%)
- Tanacetum sonbolii (35%)
- Schisandra chinensis berries (5%),
- Melia azedarach (11%),
- Neolitsea parvigemma (10%),
- Tetradenia riparia (8%)

== Biological activity ==
α-Cadinol was said to act as anti-fungal and as hepatoprotective, and was proposed as a possible remedy for drug-resistant tuberculosis.

== See also ==
- δ-Cadinol (torreyol)
