= List of county roads in Monroe County, Florida =

- County road shields used in Florida

Highway names
- Interstates: Interstate X (I-X)
- US Highways: U.S. Highway X (US X)
- State: State Road X (SR X)
- County: County Road X (CR-X)

System links
- County roads in Florida; County roads in Monroe County

The following is a list of county roads in Monroe County, Florida. All the roads here are maintained by Monroe County Department of Roads & Bridges, although not all routes are marked with standard county road shields. In the case of Monroe County, every county road was formerly a state road.

== County Road 5A ==
County Road 5A
- Location: Key West
- Length: 2.5 mi (4.0 km)

County Road 5A is Flager Avenue from White Street to Roosevelt Boulevard (SR A1A) in Key West.

=== Route description ===
Flagler Avenue begins at White Street in Key West and runs northeast. Half a mile later, it intersects First Street and Bertha Street. First Street runs north to U.S. Highway 1 (US 1) and Bertha Street runs south to SR A1A. Continuing east, Flagler Street runs just to the north of Key West International Airport before terminating at Roosevelt Boulevard (SR A1A) just south of US 1 (Overseas Highway).

=== History ===
CR 5A was originally designated SR 5A. SR 5A was an auxiliary route to US 1 (which carries the hidden designation SR 5).

=== Major intersections ===
The entire route is in Key West.

mi	km	Destinations	Notes
0.00	0.00	White Street	
0.50	0.80	First Street / Bertha Street – Downtown, Beaches	To US 1 and SR A1A
2.50	4.02	SR A1A (Roosevelt Boulevard) to US 1 – Miami	
1.000 mi = 1.609 km; 1.000 km = 0.621 mi

== County Road 905 ==
County Road 905
- Location: Key Largo–North Key Largo
- Length: 11.0 mi (17.7 km)

County Road 905 is Key Largo Drive from US 1 to the Ocean Reef Club near Grayvik.

=== Route description ===
CR 905 begins at U.S. Highway 1 (US 1), also known as the Overseas Highway, in Key Largo. From US 1, it heads northeast along Key Largo. Nine miles later, it intersects CR 905A (Card Sound Road) which runs to the mainland over the Card Sound Bridge. CR 905 then continues northwest to the Ocean Reef Club on the north end of Key Largo.

=== History ===
The southernmost 8 miles of CR 905 was the original alignment of the Overseas Highway (which was originally designated SR 4A) along with Card Sound Road. The original Overseas Highway, which was the first vehicular access to the Florida Keys came into existence in the 1920s. The Overseas Highway was later designated US 1 in 1938. In 1944, US 1 was rerouted to its current alignment between Florida City and Key Largo via Jewfish Creek (along the former Overseas Railroad). After the realignment, the Card Sound Bridge was taken out of service and the route in northern Key Largo eventually became SR 905. In 1969, a new Card Sound Bridge was built with a realigned Card Sound Road being designated SR 905A.

SR 905 was realigned to the west near Card Sound Road in the 1970s. SR 905 was subsequently turned over to county control.

=== Major intersections ===
Location	mi	km	Destinations	Notes
Key Largo	0.00	0.00	US 1 – Homestead, Florida City, Key Largo, Key West	
North Key Largo	9.20	14.81	CR 905A north (Card Sound Road) – Homestead, Turnpike, Miami	Southern terminus of CR 905A (former SR 905A); to tolled Card Sound Bridge
North Key Largo	11.00	17.70	Ocean Reef Club	Continues north as a private road
1.000 mi = 1.609 km; 1.000 km = 0.621 mi: Tolled

== County Road 905A ==
County Road 905A
- Location: North Key Largo
- Length: 4.0 mi (6.4 km)

County Road 905A is Card Sound Road from the Miami-Dade County line at the Card Sound Bridge to CR 905. It was formerly designated SR 905A.

=== Route description ===
Card Sound Road begins at CR 905 in North Key Largo. From here it heads west and crosses the Card Sound Bridge to the Florida mainland. Once across the bridge, it enters Miami-Dade County where it continues as CR 905A to US 1 near Florida City.

=== History ===
Card Sound Road was the original alignment of US 1 prior to 1944. When US 1 was rerouted to its current alignment between Florida City and Key Largo via Jewfish Creek (along the former Overseas Railroad), The original Card Sound Bridge was closed to traffic and was later destroyed by a fire. In 1969, the current Card Sound Bridge opened, which restored Card Sound Road as a through route. Though, the rebuilt Card Sound Road intersected SR 905 about 3000 feet north of the original road.

=== Major intersections ===
The entire route is in North Key Largo.

mi	km	Destinations	Notes
0.00	0.00	CR 905 – Key Largo, Ocean Ridge Club	
4.00	6.44	CR 905A north (Card Sound Bridge)	Tolled bridge; continuation into Miami-Dade County
1.000 mi = 1.609 km; 1.000 km = 0.621 mi: Tolled

== County Road 931 ==
County Road 931
- Location: Marathon

County Road 931 is the former designation for two discontinuous roads in Marathon. The eastern segment is 20th Street and 20th Street Ocean, which previously connected Marathon with Boot Key. The western segment was Sombrero Beach Road from the Corte Del Brisas Traffic Circle to US 1 in Marathon.

=== Route description ===
The western segment of CR 931 began at US 1 in Marathon. It heads south and crossed Boot Key Harbor on the Boot Key Harbor Bridge. It continued to the south shore of Boot Key and turned east to the end of Boot Key at Sister's Creek. This segment is largely abandoned since the closure of the Boot Key Harbor Bridge in 2008.

The eastern segment of CR 931 began at a roundabout with Corte Del Brisas near Sombrero Beach. From here, it ran northwest to US 1 in Marathon. The route is now city controlled.

=== History ===
Both segments were formerly designated SR 931. The western segment was largely completed in 1960 when the Boot Key Harbor Bridge was built. The bridge was a single-leaf bascule bridge over Boot Key Harbor connecting Key Vaca with Boot Key.

Sombrero Beach Road has since come under city control after Marathon was incorporated in 1999.

In 2008, the Boot Key Harbor Bridge was closed to traffic due to lack of maintenance, severing CR 931 and eliminating the only vehicular access to Boot Key. The state, county, or city of Marathon did not want to finance repairs to the bridge due to the little activity on Boot Key. In 2010, the bridge's bascule span, which had been left in the open position since the closure, was removed. The rest of the abandoned bridge remains standing in Boot Key Harbor.

== County Road 939 ==
County Road 939
- Location: Perky–Pirate's Cove
- Length: 2.7 mi (4.3 km)

County Road 939 currently runs along Sugarloaf Boulevard on Lower Sugarloaf Key.

=== Route description ===
Sugarloaf Boulevard begins at US 1 (Overseas Highway) in Perky on Lower Sugarloaf Key. From US 1, it heads southeast passing residential streets to the south end of Sugarloaf Key. It currently ends at CR 939A.

The route previously turned east at CR 939A and crossed on to Upper Sugarloaf Key and reconnected with US 1 on Upper Sugarloaf Key near Pirate's Cove. A segment of this road is still in service on Upper Sugarloaf Key providing access to Pirate's Cove from US 1.

=== History ===
Sugarloaf Boulevard and Bat Tower Road were built in the late 1920s. Real estate developer Richter Clyde Perky was developing the town of Perky on Sugarloaf Key near the Overseas Railroad at the time. Perky helped subsidize the construction of the road with Monroe County to connect his town to the Overseas Highway, which at the time ran along present-day CR 939A. The Overseas Highway (US 1) was later rerouted along the route of the Overseas Railroad in 1944. After the realignment of the Overseas Highway, Sugarloaf Boulevard was designated SR 939. SR 939 would be a loop road consisting of Sugarloaf Boulevard and the former Overseas Highway east to Upper Sugarloaf Key, where it reconnected with US 1.

SR 939's original 1920s-era wooden bridge just east of SR 939A was replaced with a concrete bridge in 1966. The 1920s-era wooden bridge over Tarpon Creek further east was subsequently destroyed by a fire and SR 939 was then closed to traffic between SR 939A and Pirate's Cove. The remaining segments of the road are now hiking trails. Remnant wooden pilings of the former bridge over Tarpon Creek still stand.

Sugarloaf Boulevard has since been turned over to county control becoming CR 939.

=== Major intersections ===
Location	mi	km	Destinations	Notes
Lower Sugarloaf Key	0.0	0.0	US 1 (Overseas Highway)	
Lower Sugarloaf Key	2.7	4.3	CR 939A west	Former SR 939A. SR 939 previously continues east.
1.000 mi = 1.609 km; 1.000 km = 0.621 mi

== County Road 939A ==
County Road 939A
- Location: Saddlebunch Keys–Lower Sugarloaf Key
- Length: 3.4 mi (5.5 km)

County Road 939A is a spur route of CR 939 on Lower Sugarloaf Key and the Saddlebunch Keys. It notably serves Sugarloaf Beach.

=== Route description ===
CR 939A begins at Sugarloaf Boulevard (CR 939) and runs along the southern coast of Sugarloaf Key. It passes Sugarloaf Beach and Paradise Beach before crossing a small bridge across Sugarloaf Creek on to the Saddlebunch Keys. It comes to a dead end a mile later.

=== History ===
CR 939A was originally part of the lower keys segment of the original Overseas Highway. The original Overseas Highway opened in the 1920s and was designated State Road 4A before becoming US 1 in 1938. When lower keys segment of US 1 was rerouted to its current alignment along the former Overseas Railroad in 1944, it was redesignated SR 939A east of Sugarloaf Boulevard (SR 939). The wooden bridge connecting the original highway to Geiger Key further west was removed in the late 1940s. The road west of the current terminus of CR 939A to the west end of the Saddlebunch Keys was subsequently closed to vehicular traffic and is now the Lower Sugarloaf Key Trail. The road's original wooden bridge over Sugarloaf Creek, which separates Sugarloaf Key and the Saddlebunch Keys, was replaced with the current concrete bridge in 1968. The road was later turned over to county control, becoming CR 939A.

== County Road 940 ==
County Road 940
- Location: Big Pine Key
- Length: 4.5 mi (7.2 km)

County Road 940 is Key Deer Boulevard on Big Pine Key.

=== Route description ===
Key Deer Boulevard begins at the Overseas Highway (US 1) on Big Pine Key and heads northwest. After 1.5 miles, it intersects with Watson Boulevard, which provides access to No Name Key. Key Deer Boulevard continues northwest into the National Key Deer Refuge and terminates at the north end of Big Pine Key.

=== History ===
In the 1930s, present-day Key Deer Boulevard connected the area of Big Pine Key near the Overseas Railroad with the original Overseas Highway (SR 4A), which ran along present-day Watson Boulevard at the time. The Overseas Railroad was abandoned in 1935 and the Overseas Highway was rerouted to the former railroad corridor east of Big Pine Key in 1938. Key Deer Boulevard would then carry the Overseas Highway (US 1) between the new highway and the original highway until 1944, when US 1 was rerouted on to the former railroad east of Big Pine Key. The route was later designated SR 940 before becoming CR 940 when it was turned over to county control.

== County Road 941 ==
County Road 941
- Location: Boca Chica Key–Rockland Key
- Length: 3.1 mi (5.0 km)

County Road 941 is Boca Chica Road on Boca Chica Key and Big Coppitt Key.

=== Route description ===
Boca Chica Road begins at the Overseas Highway (US 1) on Big Coppitt Key. It heads south to Geiger Key, providing access to residential areas. It then southwest onto Boca Chica Key. On Boca Chica Key, it crosses Geiger Creek and comes to a dead end at Boca Chica Beach Park just south of Naval Air Station Key West.

Boca Chica Road previously continued west of this point another three miles along the south side of Naval Air Station Key West and the shore of Boca Chica Key to Boca Chica Beach, but this segment was closed to vehicular traffic and is now a hiking trial.

=== History ===
Both Geiger Road and Boca Chica Road from a point about 400 feet south of Geiger Road were originally part of the original lower keys segment of the Overseas Highway (SR 4A), which was built in the 1920s. The Overseas Highway, which was designated US 1 in 1938, was rerouted to the former right of way of the Overseas Railroad in the lower keys in 1944. The rest of Boca Chica Road north of Geiger Road was then built to connect the original road to the new US 1. By 1946, wooden bridges that carried the original Overseas Highway from Boca Chica Key west to Stock Island and from Geiger Key east to the Saddlebunch Keys were removed by the State Road Department.

Boca Chica Road was later designated SR 941 before becoming CR 941 when it was turned over to county control.

== County Road 942 ==
County Road 942
- Location: Summerland Key
- Length: 1.4 mi (2.3 km)

County Road 942 (CR 942) is Ocean Drive and East Shore Drive in Summerland Key. It begins at US 1 and heads south along East Shore Drive. It runs through a residential community before it turns southwest. At an intersection with West Shore Drive, CR 942 becomes Ocean Drive and runs to the south end of Summerland Key where it terminates at a cul-de-sac. The road was formerly designated SR 942.

== See also ==
- State Roads in the Florida Keys
