= Sugarloaf Key =

Island in the lower Florida Keys, United States

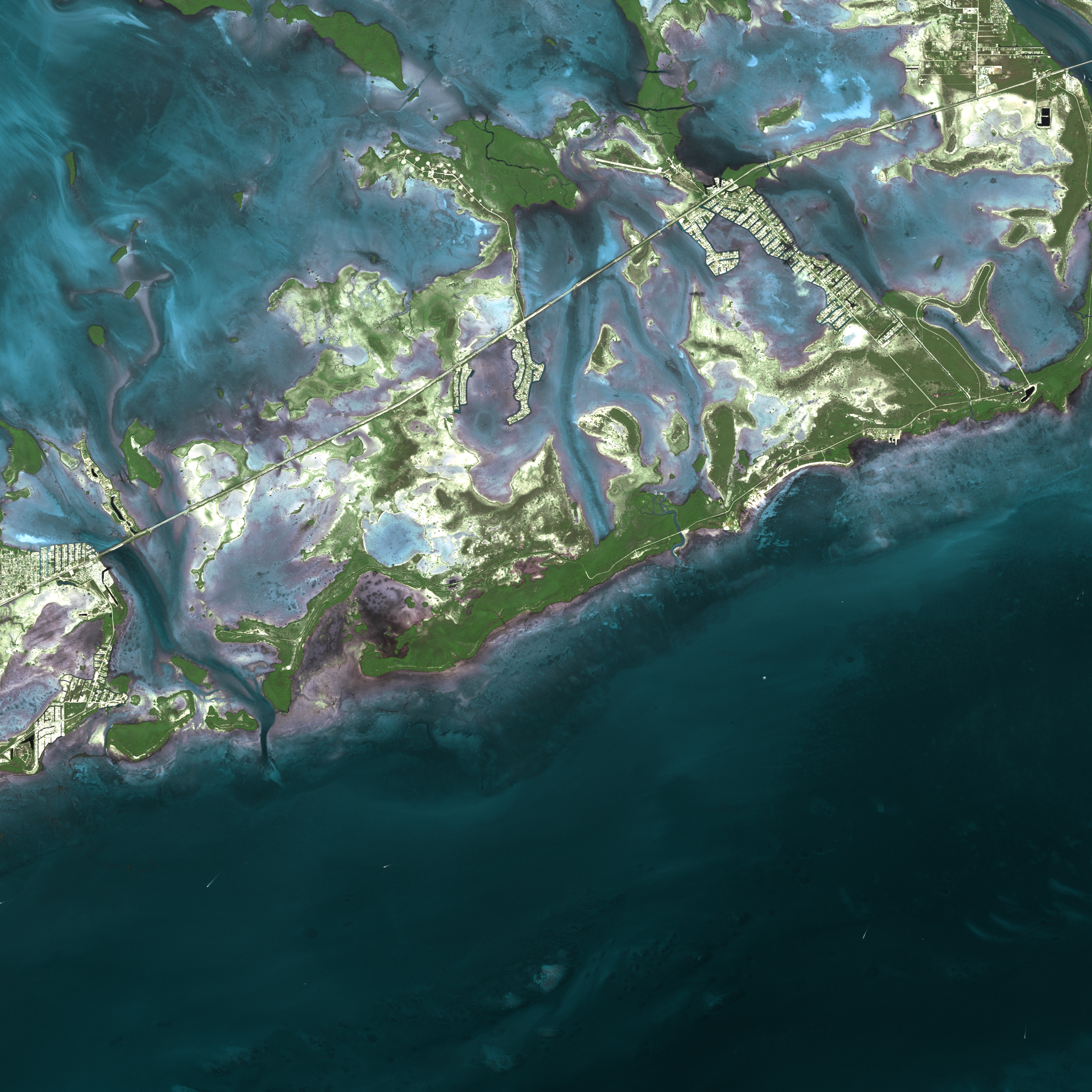
- A satellite image of Sugarloaf Key

- Location within Florida Location within the Caribbean

Geography
- Location: Gulf of Mexico
- Coordinates: 24.628°N 81.514°W
- Archipelago: Florida Keys
- Adjacent to: Florida Straits

Administration
- United States
- State: Florida
- County: Monroe

Sugarloaf Key is a single island in the lower Florida Keys that forms a loop on the Atlantic Ocean side, giving the illusion of separate islands. Although frequently referred to simply and with technical accuracy as "Sugarloaf Key", this island contains two distinct island communities, known as Lower Sugarloaf Key and Upper Sugarloaf Key.

== History ==
The name Sugarloaf, is variously attributed as arising from either an Indian mound on the east side of Upper Sugarloaf Key, north of the present highway was said to look like an old-fashioned loaf of sugar or from the variety of pineapple called "sugarloaf" that was once grown in the area. These pineapples are rarely in commercial use any longer since they are soft and do not travel well. The unincorporated community of Pirates Cove on the island was the location of one of the stations of the Overseas Railroad.

== Geography ==
The island is somewhat U-shaped, with Upper Sugarloaf Sound and Park Key separating the island into Upper Sugarloaf Key and Lower Sugarloaf Key. So called, upper and lower, simply referencing the relative nature of their geographic positions, not as distinct islands. Lower Sugarloaf Key is about 13 mi (21 km) from Key West, between Park Key and Saddlebunch Keys and Upper Sugarloaf Key is about 15 mi (24 km) east of Key West, between Park Key and Cudjoe Key. Though Lower Sugarloaf Key has a greater density of population, it is smaller in area than Upper Sugarloaf Key.

== Ecology ==
Plant species native to the island include buttonwood, poisonwood, sea grape and thatch palm. Of fauna, ibises are found on the island, and dolphins, parrotfish, snapper, barracuda and octopus can be seen in the local waters.

== Community ==
Lower Sugarloaf Key has family owned Sugarloaf Lodge and restaurant, an airport, Sugarloaf Volunteer Fire Station, and Sugarloaf Key Bat Tower.

Upper Sugarloaf Key has two public schools, a church, restaurant, commercial offices, public campground and the Great White Heron National Wildlife Refuge.

Covering 14 acres (5.7 ha), Sugarloaf Key has the southernmost KOA campground in North America.

== Transportation ==
U.S. 1 (or the Overseas Highway) crosses Upper Sugarloaf Key at approximately mile markers 19–20.5 and Lower Sugarloaf Key at approximate mile markers 16.5–17.5.

Sugarloaf Key is already part of the Overseas Highway and will soon join other islands of the Florida Keys as part of the Florida Keys Overseas Heritage Trail connecting mainland Florida to Key West via bicycle path(s).
