= Key Largo =

Island in the upper Florida Keys archipelago

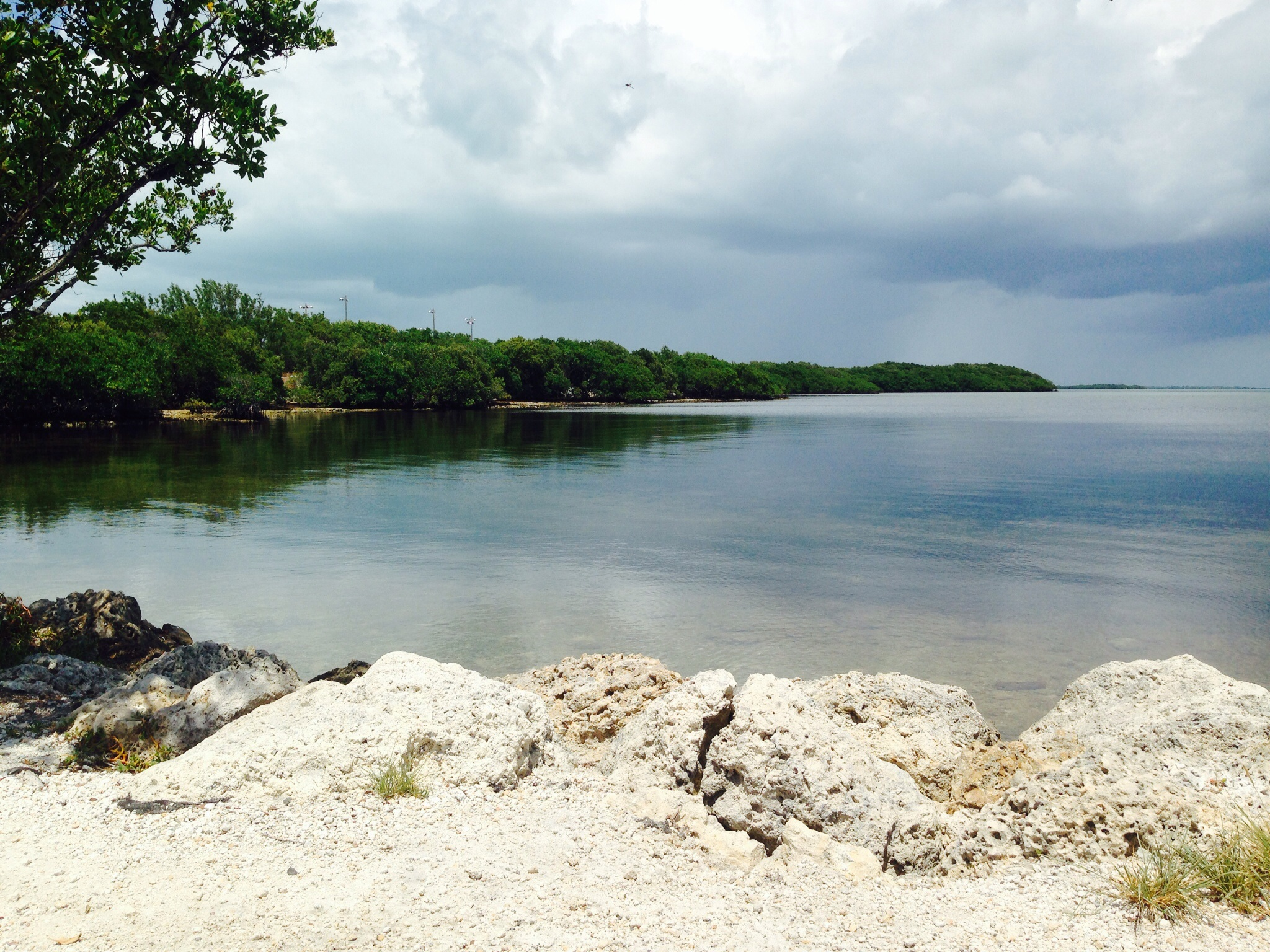
- Key Largo

- Key Largo Key Largo (the Caribbean)

Geography
- Location: Gulf of Mexico
- Coordinates: 25.0865°N 80.4473°W
- Archipelago: Florida Keys
- Adjacent to: Florida Straits

Administration
- United States
- State: Florida
- County: Monroe

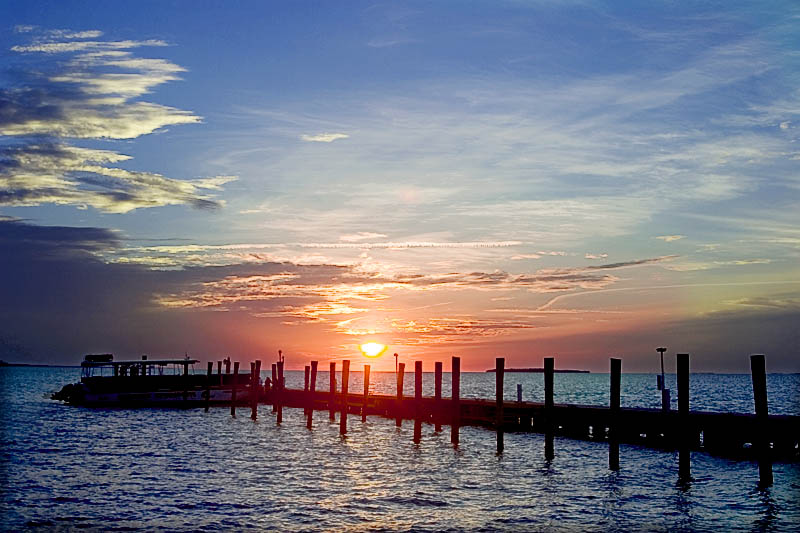
December sunset, Key Largo

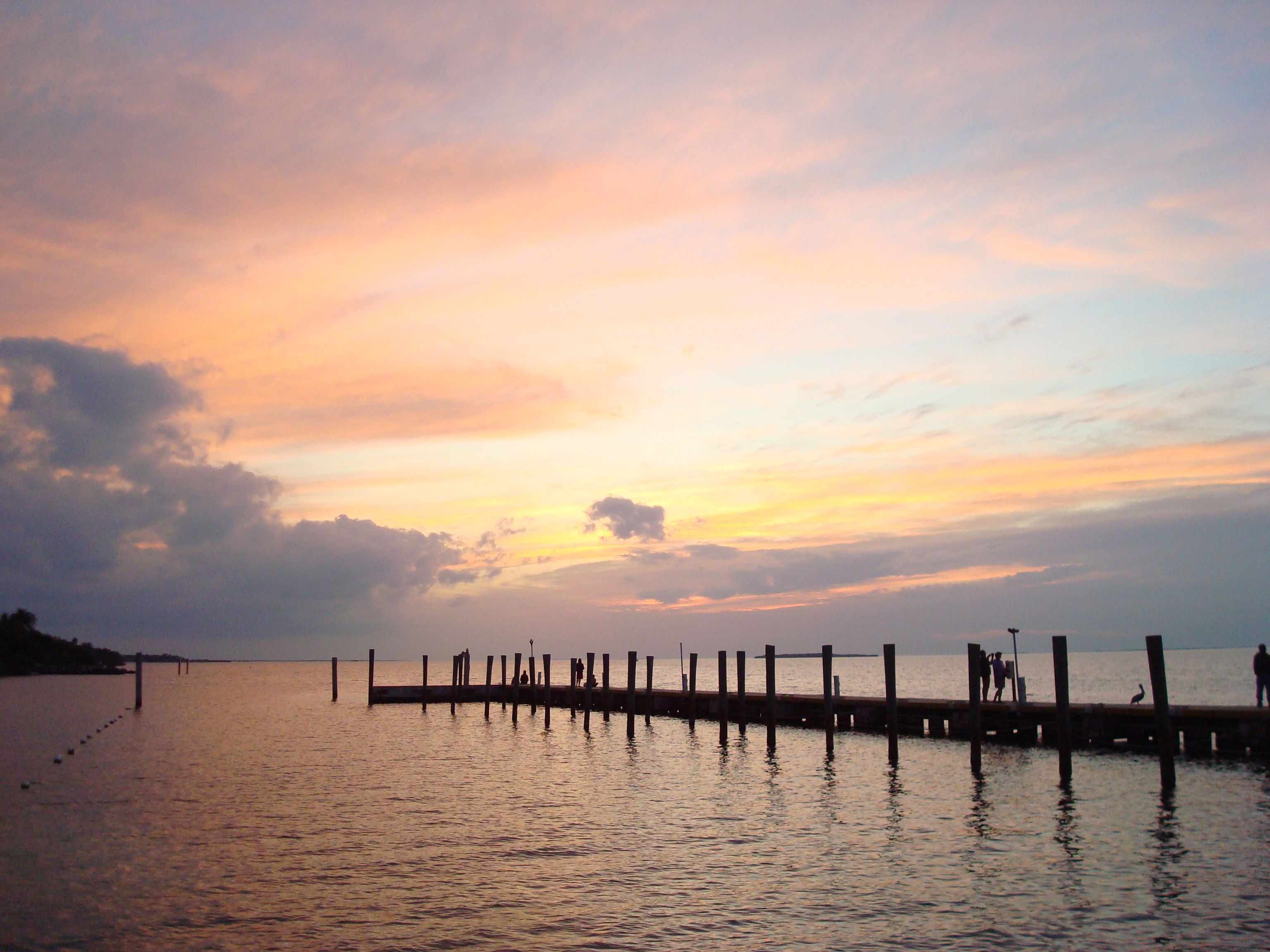
Sunset, Key Largo

Key Largo (Spanish: Cayo Largo) is an island in the upper Florida Keys archipelago and is the largest section of the keys, at 33 miles (53 km) long. It is one of the northernmost of the Florida Keys in Monroe County and the northernmost of the keys connected by U.S. Highway 1 (the Overseas Highway). Three census-designated places (CDPs) are on the island of Key Largo: North Key Largo (near the Card Sound Bridge), Key Largo (roughly 8–9 miles (13–14 km) from the island's southernmost point), and Tavernier (at the island's south end). As of 2020, these three CDPs have a combined population of 16,408. None of Key Largo is an incorporated municipality; it is governed, at the local level, by Monroe County.

Key Largo is connected to the mainland of Miami-Dade County by two routes, the Overseas Highway (the southernmost portion of U.S. Highway 1, which enters Key Largo at Jewfish Creek near the middle of the island before turning southwest) and Card Sound Road, which connects to the northern end of Key Largo and runs southeastward, connecting with County Road 905, which runs southwest and joins U.S. 1 around mile marker 106. These routes originate at Florida City on the mainland.

Key Largo, a popular destination for many, has been dubbed the "Diving Capital of the World", as the living coral reefs, a few miles offshore, attract thousands of scuba divers, sport-fishing enthusiasts, and scientific researchers each year.

Key Largo's proximity to the Everglades also makes it an ideal starting point for scientists, kayakers, and ecotourists, among others. Automotive and highway pioneer (and Miami Beach developer) Carl G. Fisher built the Caribbean Club in 1938 as his last project.

Key Largo is situated between Everglades National Park to the northwest and John Pennekamp Coral Reef State Park, the first underwater park in the United States, to the east. The latter state park protects part of the Florida Reef, the only living coral barrier reef in the continental United States. Barrier reefs are critical to coastal communities and environments, as they are able to dissipate up to 97% of the oceanic wave forces exerted during hurricanes and other tropical storms, with the reef serving as a protective buffer against flooding further inland. The barrier reef itself provides over $675 million in storm surge protection annually.

== History ==
When Europeans first arrived in the Florida Keys in the 16th century, the area was uninhabited or only sparsely inhabited by indigenous peoples such as the Calusa and the Tequesta. The earliest description of the area and its inhabitants was by Hernando de Escalante Fontaneda, a survivor of a shipwreck, who lived among the Calusa people from 1549 to 1566. The earliest reference to Key Largo is found on a map prepared in 1639 by Dutch cartographer Johannes Vingboons, on which it is named Caio des 12 Leguas (islet of 12 leagues). Some time later, it was named Cayo Largo — meaning long islet — by Spanish explorers.

In 1770, Dutch surveyor Bernard Romans reported that the area was uninhabited, although evidence was found that indigenous people visited the area from time to time. By the end of the Third Seminole War in 1858, the area was under the control of the United States government, though it remained largely uninhabited. In 1870, a post office was established at "Cayo Largo" (in the current Rock Harbor area). It closed and another was opened called "Largo" in 1881. Additional post offices opened in Planter in 1891 and Aiken in 1895.

The island gained fame as the setting for the 1948 film Key Largo, but apart from background filming used for establishing shots, the film was shot on a Warner Bros. sound stage in Hollywood. After the film's success, pressure from local businesses resulted in a change in the name of the post office serving the northern part of the island, from "Rock Harbor" to "Key Largo", on June 1, 1952. After that, every resident north of Tavernier had a Key Largo address and the postmark read "Key Largo".

== Geology and geography ==
The island of Key Largo is an exposed, fossilized remnant of a coral reef formed during a period of higher sea level and then uncovered and eroded during a subsequent ice age. The highest elevation is a slight ridge forming the spine of the island, which rises to about 15 feet (4.6 m) above mean sea level.

The island's substrate is called Key Largo limestone; in many places, fossilized corals are visible at the surface. Solution holes, which are pockets dissolved in the limestone by acidic rainwater, form shallow depressions in the land. The natural shoreline of the island is generally rocky. A slippery, gray, limestone-based clay called "marl" is the shoreline and near-shore soil. No natural sand beaches occur on the island. Inland, decomposed vegetation forms a rich, acidic humus soil up to about 6 in (15 cm) thick, topped by leaf litter. The soil supports a diverse flora of herbaceous plants, woody shrubs, and hardwood trees.

== Climate ==
Key Largo has a tropical monsoon climate (Köppen climate classification Am), with hot, wet summers and warm, moderately dry winters. Frost has never been recorded on the island. Key Largo enjoys close to 3,000 hours of sunshine annually.

Climate data for John Pennekamp Coral Reef State Park (1991–2020 normals, extremes 2004–present)
Month	Jan	Feb	Mar	Apr	May	Jun	Jul	Aug	Sep	Oct	Nov	Dec	Year
Record high °F (°C)	84 (29)	89 (32)	87 (31)	93 (34)	93 (34)	94 (34)	95 (35)	93 (34)	97 (36)	91 (33)	88 (31)	86 (30)	97 (36)
Mean maximum °F (°C)	81.7 (27.6)	83.1 (28.4)	85.0 (29.4)	87.0 (30.6)	88.4 (31.3)	90.9 (32.7)	91.9 (33.3)	91.9 (33.3)	90.9 (32.7)	89.0 (31.7)	85.2 (29.6)	83.1 (28.4)	92.9 (33.8)
Mean daily maximum °F (°C)	76.2 (24.6)	78.0 (25.6)	79.7 (26.5)	82.5 (28.1)	85.1 (29.5)	88.1 (31.2)	89.8 (32.1)	90.1 (32.3)	88.8 (31.6)	85.9 (29.9)	81.4 (27.4)	78.1 (25.6)	83.6 (28.7)
Mean daily minimum °F (°C)	62.6 (17.0)	64.5 (18.1)	66.8 (19.3)	70.7 (21.5)	74.2 (23.4)	77.2 (25.1)	78.5 (25.8)	78.8 (26.0)	77.8 (25.4)	75.3 (24.1)	69.9 (21.1)	65.8 (18.8)	71.8 (22.1)
Mean minimum °F (°C)	45.8 (7.7)	49.2 (9.6)	52.5 (11.4)	59.2 (15.1)	66.8 (19.3)	71.4 (21.9)	72.8 (22.7)	72.8 (22.7)	72.1 (22.3)	65.4 (18.6)	57.4 (14.1)	51.7 (10.9)	43.5 (6.4)
Record low °F (°C)	34 (1)	38 (3)	44 (7)	52 (11)	60 (16)	68 (20)	70 (21)	71 (22)	65 (18)	54 (12)	46 (8)	37 (3)	34 (1)
Average precipitation inches (mm)	2.13 (54)	2.01 (51)	2.22 (56)	3.33 (85)	4.76 (121)	7.91 (201)	5.81 (148)	6.89 (175)	8.18 (208)	7.87 (200)	3.31 (84)	2.53 (64)	56.95 (1,447)
Average precipitation days (≥ 0.01 in)	7.5	6.2	5.1	6.7	7.1	10.9	13.0	14.5	16.1	11.6	8.9	7.9	115.5
Source: NOAA (precip days 2006–2020)
