= Upper Sugarloaf Key =

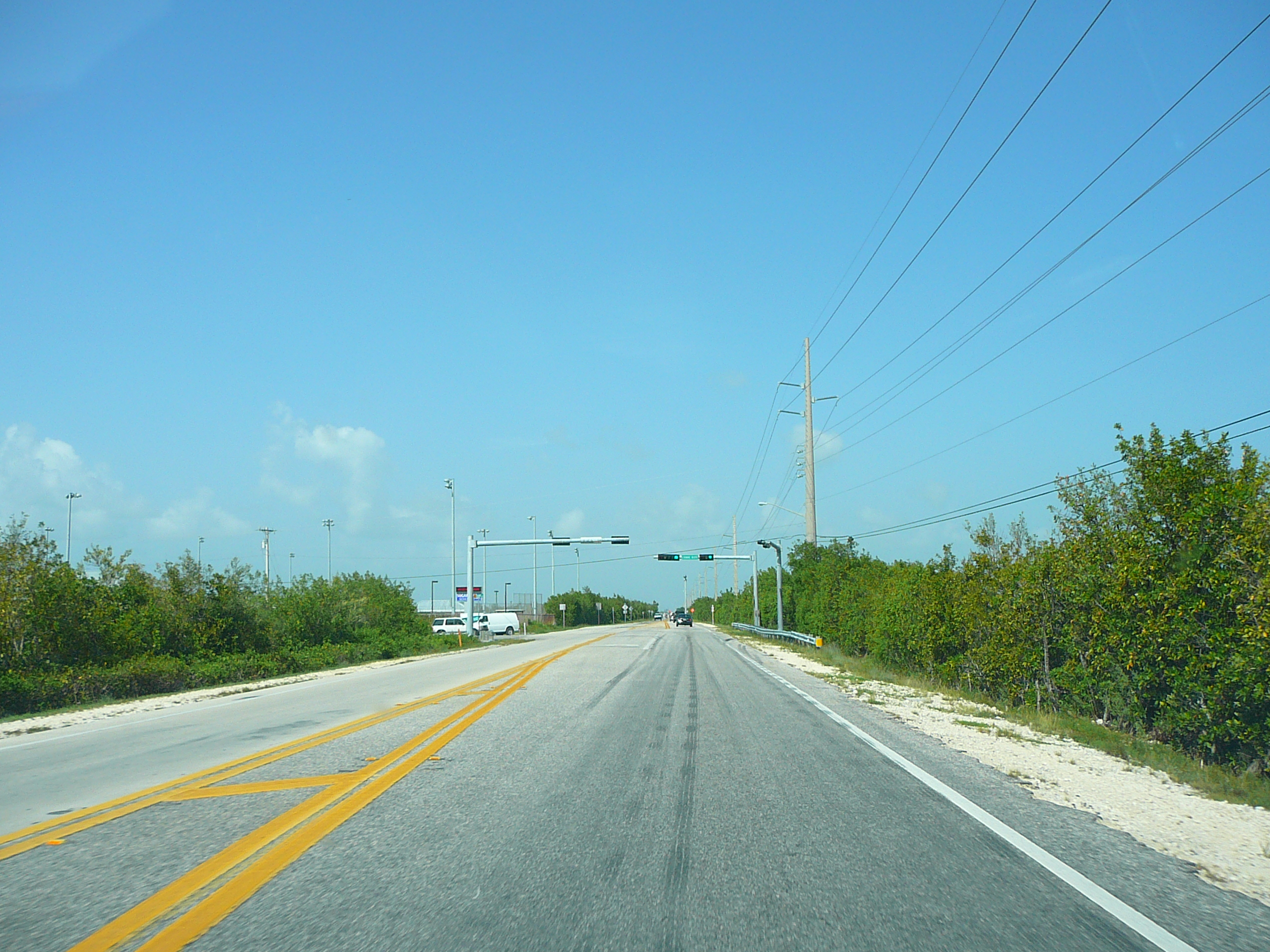
- One of the rare stoplights in the lower Keys Overseas Highway, at Crane Blvd, is on Upper Sugarloaf Key. Crane Boulevard, leads to Sugarloaf Elementary school and Sugarloaf Middle School, residential area of the island and the Great White Heron National Wildlife Refuge with an excellent bicycling trail.

- Upper Sugarloaf Key Upper Sugarloaf Key (the Caribbean)

Geography
- Location: Gulf of Mexico
- Coordinates: 24.662°N 81.529°W
- Archipelago: Florida Keys
- Adjacent to: Florida Straits

Administration
- United States
- State: Florida
- County: Monroe

Upper Sugarloaf Key is located in the Florida Keys. It located between MM20.5-MM19 and bridge number 28/29 at Bow Channel/Park Key. U.S. 1 (or the Overseas Highway) crosses the key at approximately mile markers 19–20.5. Upper Sugarloaf Key is located about 15 miles east of Key West, between Park Key and Cudjoe Key. It is the upper arm of a large island, Sugarloaf Key, that includes Lower Sugarloaf Key.

"Upper Sugarloaf Key" is the upper portion of the island of Sugarloaf Key; hence the name. The island is U-shaped, with Upper Sugarloaf Sound and Park Key in the center.

"Upper Sugarloaf Key" has a public school, church, restaurant, and KOA campground. Sugarloaf Elementary School and Sugarloaf Middle School are located at the intersection of U.S. Route 1 and Crane Blvd.

Great White Heron National Wildlife Refuge is located at the far end of Crane Boulevard.

The name Sugarloaf, is variously attributed as coming from either an Indian mound on the east side of Upper Sugarloaf Key, north of the present highway, which was said to look like an old-fashioned loaf of sugar or from the variety of pineapple called 'sugarloaf' that was once grown in the area. These pineapples are rarely seen in commercial use since they are soft and do not travel well.
