= Shark Key =

Island in the lower Florida Keys, United States

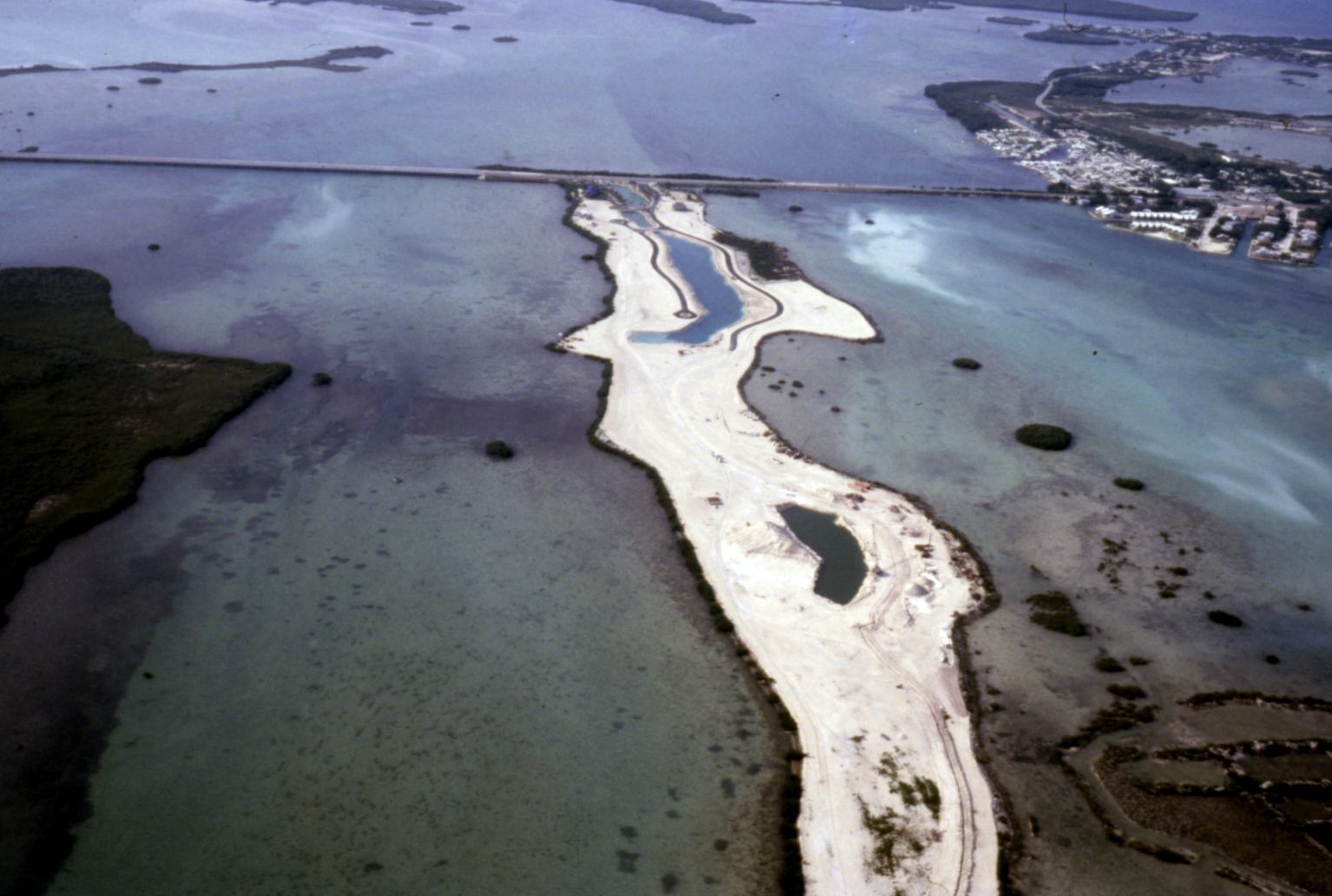
- Aerial view of Shark Key, July 1988

- Shark Key Shark Key (the Caribbean)

Geography
- Location: Gulf of Mexico
- Coordinates: 24.606503°N 81.647859°W
- Archipelago: Florida Keys
- Adjacent to: Florida Straits

Administration
- United States
- State: Florida
- County: Monroe

Shark Key is an island in the lower Florida Keys about 7 miles (11 km) east of Key West.

It is located north of, and connected to, U.S. 1 (or the Overseas Highway) at approximately mile marker 11.5, between the Saddlebunch Keys and Big Coppitt Key. It is part of the census-designated place of Big Coppitt Key, Florida.

Its earlier name was Stark Key.
