= Bay Point, Florida =

Bay Point may refer to:

- Bay Point, Monroe County, Florida, in the Florida Keys
- Bay Point, Bay County, Florida, in unincorporated Bay County east of Panama City Beach
