= Geiger Key =

Island in the lower Florida Keys, United States

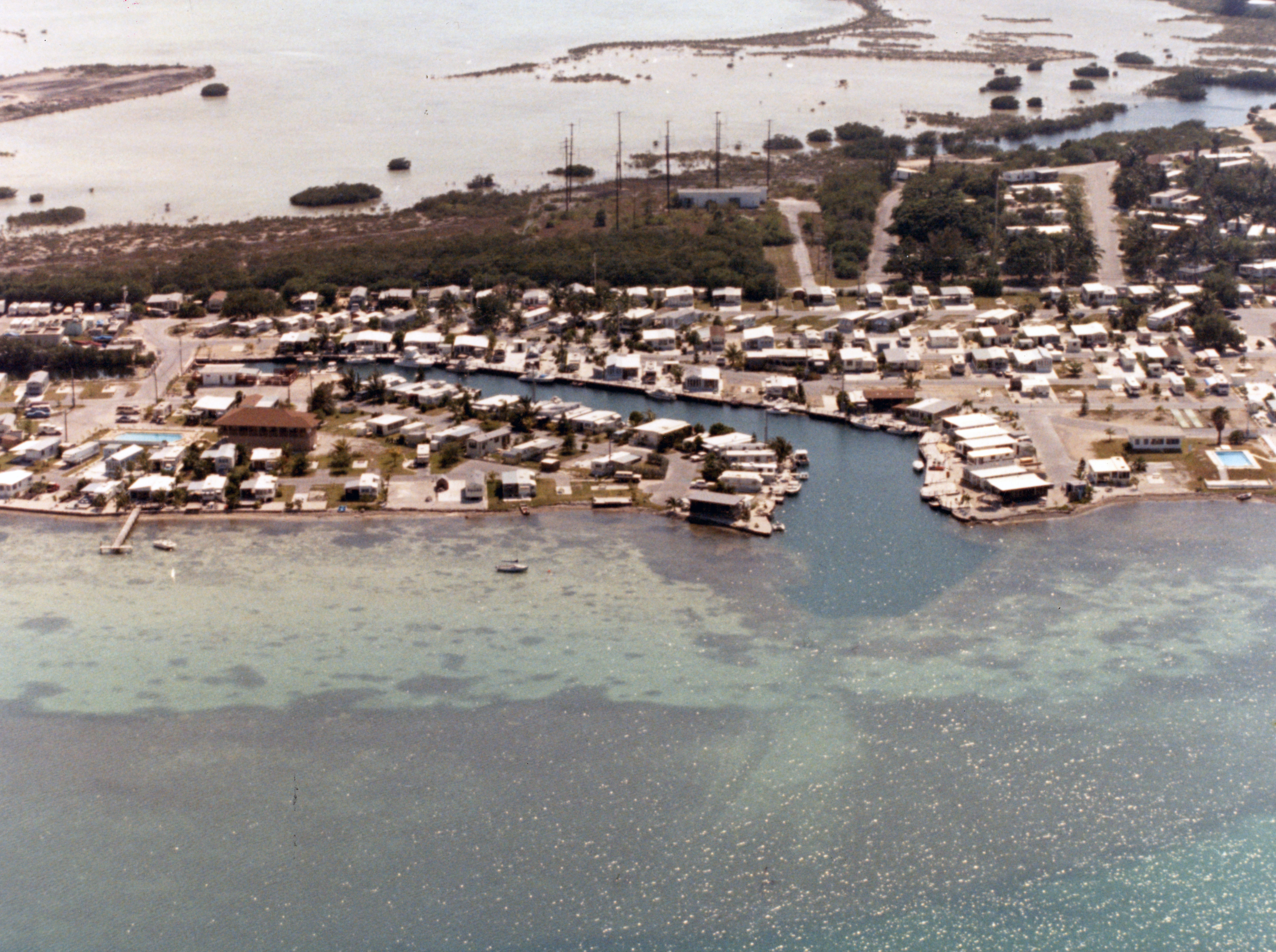
- An aerial of Geiger Key Campground, October 1987
- Interactive map of Geiger Key

Geography
- Location: Gulf of Mexico
- Coordinates: 24°34′55.53″N 81°39′9.32″W
- Archipelago: Florida Keys
- Adjacent to: Florida Straits
- Highest elevation: 0 ft (0 m)

Administration
- United States
- State: Florida
- County: Monroe

Geiger Key is an island in the lower Florida Keys about 5 miles (8 km) east of Key West. It is located to the south of, and bridged to, Big Coppitt Key via Boca Chica Road (County Road 941) at about mile marker 11 on U.S. 1 (or the Overseas Highway). It is part of the census-designated place of Big Coppitt Key, Florida.

Best known today for its low profile clothing optional beaches. It also contains the trailer park community of Tamarac, Geiger Key Pub & Grill and Geiger Key Marina.

== Henry Huling Geiger ==
It was named after Henry Huling Geiger, an early Keys settler, who had obtained land on the Key in 1843 under the "Armed Occupation Act of 1842". (Permit Number 127, dated July 19, 1843). He also owned property in the city of Key West (Key West land records, 1847–1864).

Henry Geiger was the son of John Geiger of Pennsylvania and Catherine Huling of Maryland, who had emigrated to St. Augustine in Spanish Florida in 1805. (St. Augustine Cathedral records).

From John Viele's The Florida Keys: A History of the Pioneers: "A. D. Bache, in the notes for his Coast Survey conducted in 1861 says of the Key: 'Geiger's Key is 2 miles [3.2 km] long and 1 mile [1.6 km] wide. It was in good cultivation in 1855 [the time of his visit], and was then inhabited by an industrious German, from whom it derived its name'"... referring to Henry Huling Geiger. Henry expanded his holdings in the area (Boca Chica) through purchase of an adjacent plantation owned by Adolf Santini in 1867.

The same reference, and Federal Census Records, also indicate that Henry was a planter/farmer, woodcutter, and tanner, and that he was assisted by a free black gentleman, Robert Allen, at least two other single men, and at least one slave.

Henry had one child, a son, John Robert Geiger, born out of wedlock, for whom he sought (and was granted) legitimacy through an act of the Florida State Assembly in 1850. (Source data: "Acts and Resolutions of the 5th Session of the General Assembly of the State of Florida", Tallahassee, November 25, 1850, to January 24, 1851. Chapter 469 - [No. 158] Pg. 179–180). No record of a wife or other children has been found.

After his death in September 1872, his son and heir, John Robert Geiger, sold his father's land holdings to his uncle, Captain John Geiger of Key West in April 1873.

No physical architectural remains of the original Geiger Key plantation have survived.

Henry Geiger's younger brother, Captain John Henry Geiger, had previously settled, and was a well-known citizen of Key West, having settled there before Henry's arrival in the Keys. Captain Geiger was a successful Key West wrecker with whom John James Audubon lived during his 1832 stay in the Keys. Audubon painted and named a local species of flowering tree which was growing in Captain Geiger's gardens the "Geiger Tree" (Cordia sebestena). Captain Geiger's home and gardens in Key West have been preserved and restored as a museum, store and event venue as (erroneously) "Audubon House and Tropical Gardens".
