= Sugarloaf Shores, Florida =

- Unincorporated community
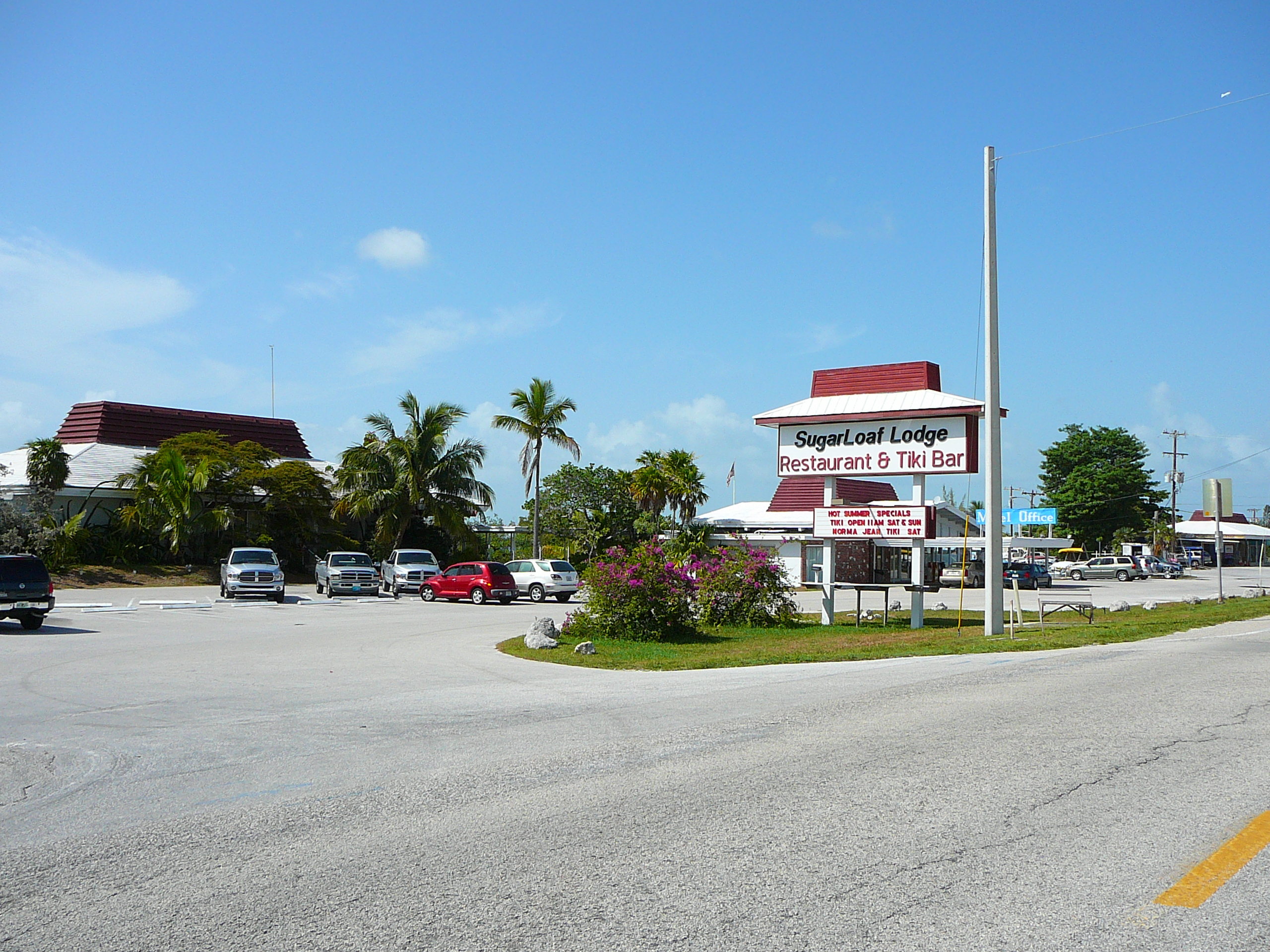
- Sugarloaf Lodge on U.S. 1 in Sugarloaf Shores

- Location within Florida Location within the United States
- Coordinates: 24.644°N 81.562°W
- Country: United States
- State: Florida
- County: Monroe
- Elevation: 3.3 ft (1 m)
- Time zone: UTC-5 (Eastern (EST))
  - Summer (DST): UTC-4 (EDT)

Sugarloaf Shores is an unincorporated community in Monroe County, Florida, United States, located in the lower Florida Keys on Lower Sugarloaf Key near mile marker 17 on US 1 (the Overseas Highway).

It is directly across US 1 from the ghost town of Perky.

== Geography ==
It is located at 24.644°N 81.562°W with an elevation of 3 feet (1 m).

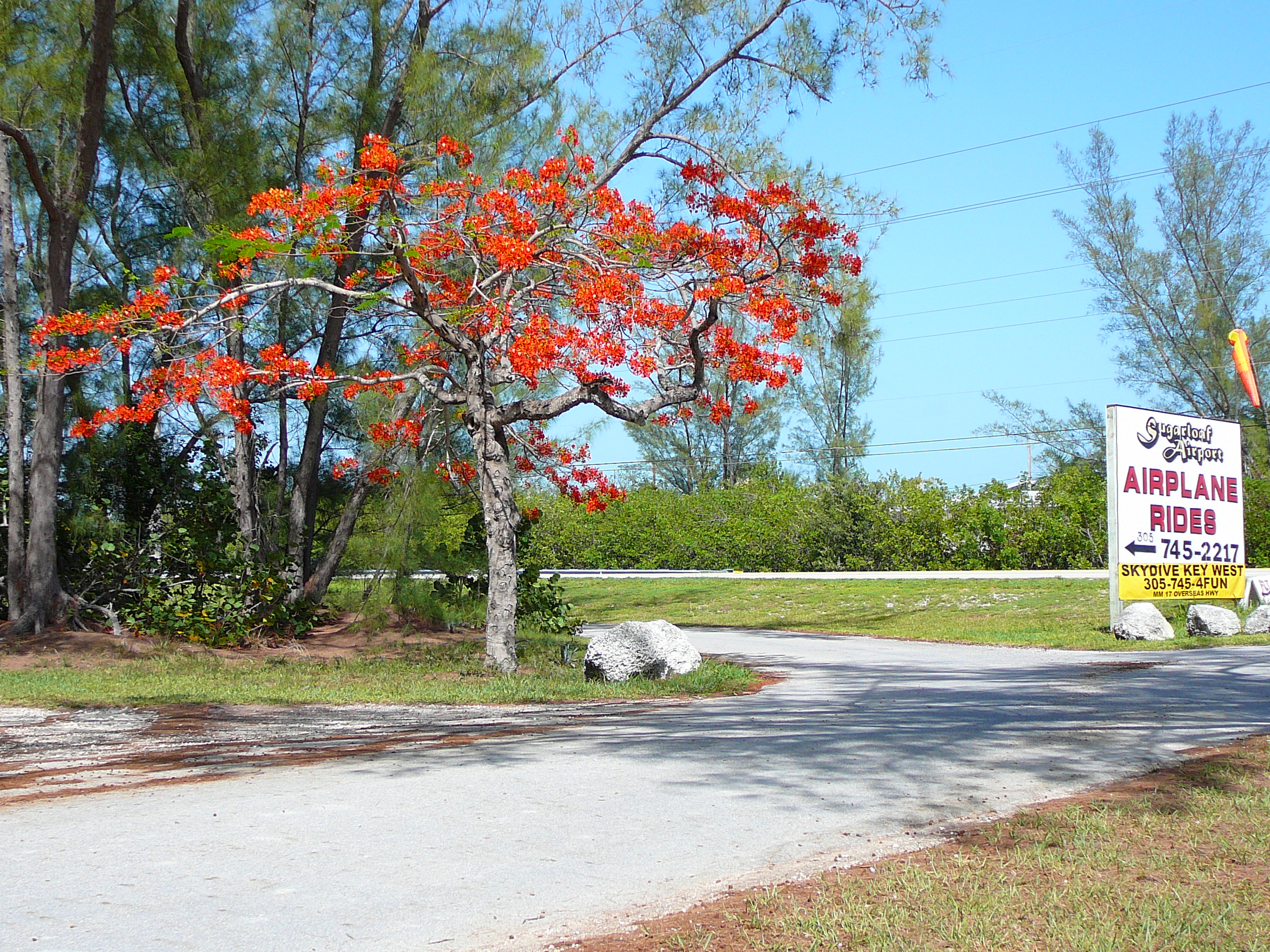
Road to Sugarloaf Airport
