= Bay Point, Monroe County, Florida =

Bay Point, Florida
- Unincorporated community
- Location within Florida Location within the United States
- Coordinates: 24.627°N 81.592°W
- Country: United States
- State: Florida
- County: Monroe
- Elevation: 3.3 ft (1 m)
- Time zone: UTC-5 (Eastern (EST))
  - Summer (DST): UTC-4 (EDT)

Bay Point is an unincorporated community in Monroe County, Florida, United States, located in the lower Florida Keys in the Saddlebunch Keys near mile marker 15 on US 1 (the Overseas Highway).

== Geography ==
Bay Point is flat with very few low hills. It is located at 24.625406°N 81.592197°W, at an elevation of 3 feet (1 m).
