= Park Key =

Island in the lower Florida Keys, United States

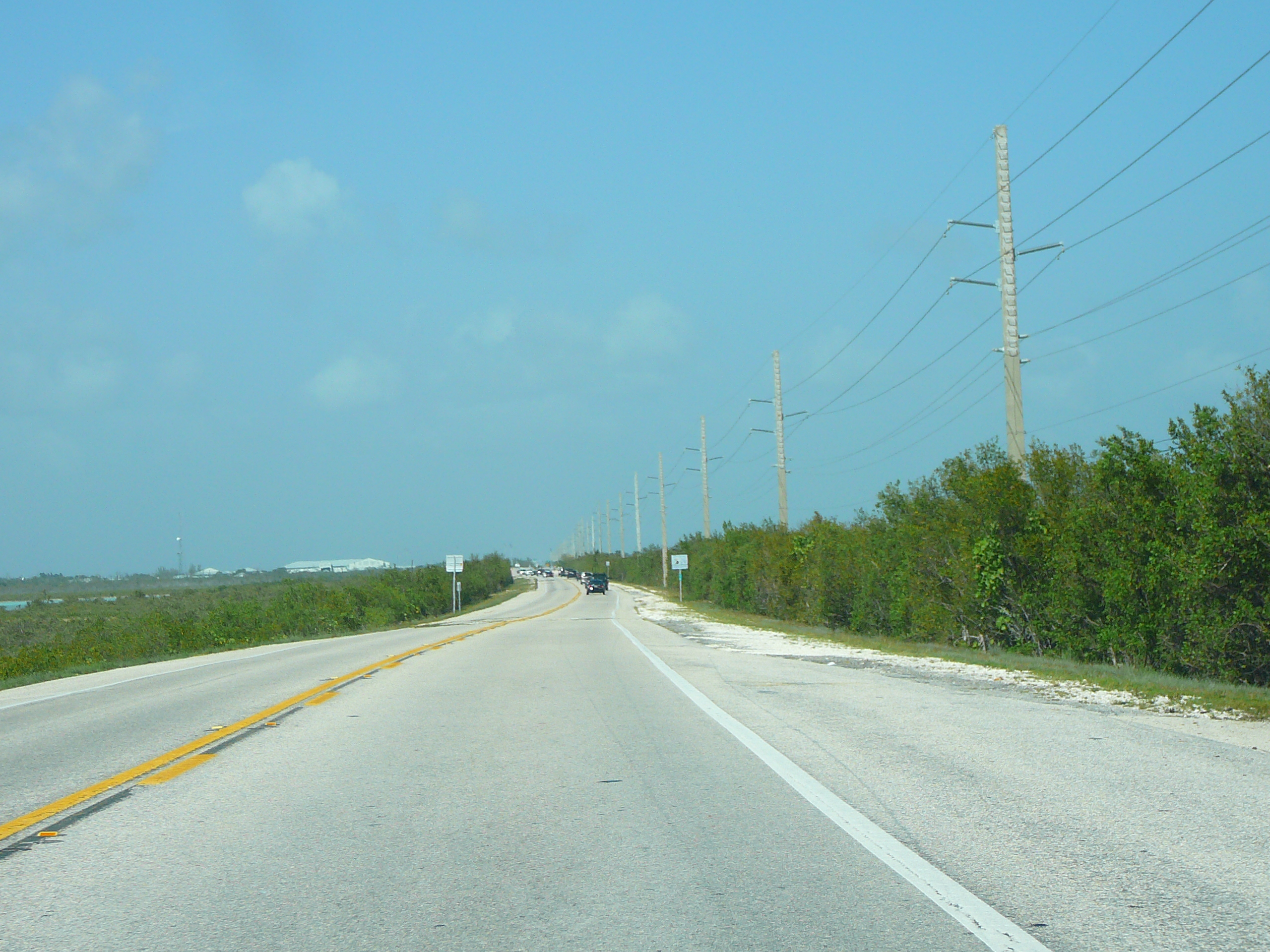
- Tiny uninhabited Park Key acts as a natural causeway for US-1

- Park Key Park Key (the Caribbean)

Geography
- Location: Gulf of Mexico
- Coordinates: 24.653°N 81.549°W
- Archipelago: Florida Keys
- Adjacent to: Florida Straits

Administration
- United States
- State: Florida
- County: Monroe

Park Key is an uninhabited island in the lower Florida Keys about 14 miles (23 km) east of Key West. It is 1500 meters long, and between 75 and 260 meters wide (190 meters on the average). It measures 70 acres (28 hectares) in area.

The island was made from fill, so that the railroad and later the road bed could be laid down. It is a habitat for Linum arenicola.

U.S. 1 (or the Overseas Highway) crosses Park Key at about mile marker 18, between Lower Sugarloaf Key and Sugarloaf Key in the middle of Upper Sugarloaf Sound. It serves only as a causeway and is uninhabited.
