= Perky, Florida =

- Ghost town
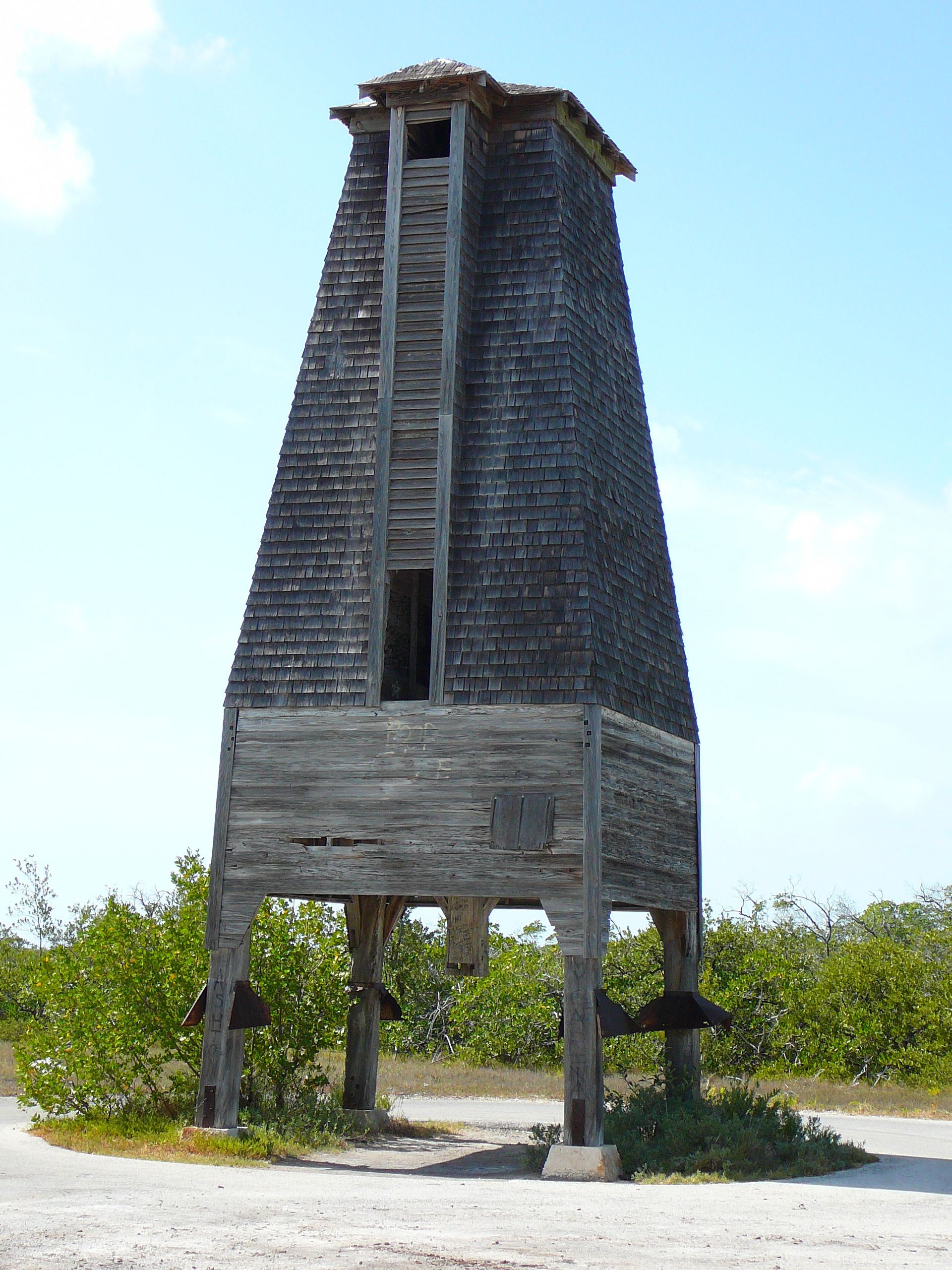
- Remains of the bat tower

- Location within Florida Location within the United States
- Coordinates: 24.649°N 81.572°W
- Country: United States
- State: Florida
- County: Monroe
- Elevation: 0 ft (0 m)
- Time zone: UTC-5 (Eastern (EST))
  - Summer (DST): UTC-4 (EDT)

Perky is a ghost town in Monroe County, Florida, United States. It is located in the lower Florida Keys on Lower Sugarloaf Key near mile marker 17 on US 1 (the Overseas Highway).

A post office called Perky was established in 1929, and remained in operation until 1942. The town was named for its founder, R. C. Perky.

It is the site of the historic Sugarloaf Key Bat Tower built by Richter Clyde Perky in 1929. The tower was destroyed in 2017 by Hurricane Irma, and the original fishcamp is now a restaurant and lodge.

== Geography ==
It is located at 24.649°N 81.572°W with an elevation of 0 feet (0 m).
