= Saddlebunch Keys =

Series of mangrove islands in the Florida Keys, United States

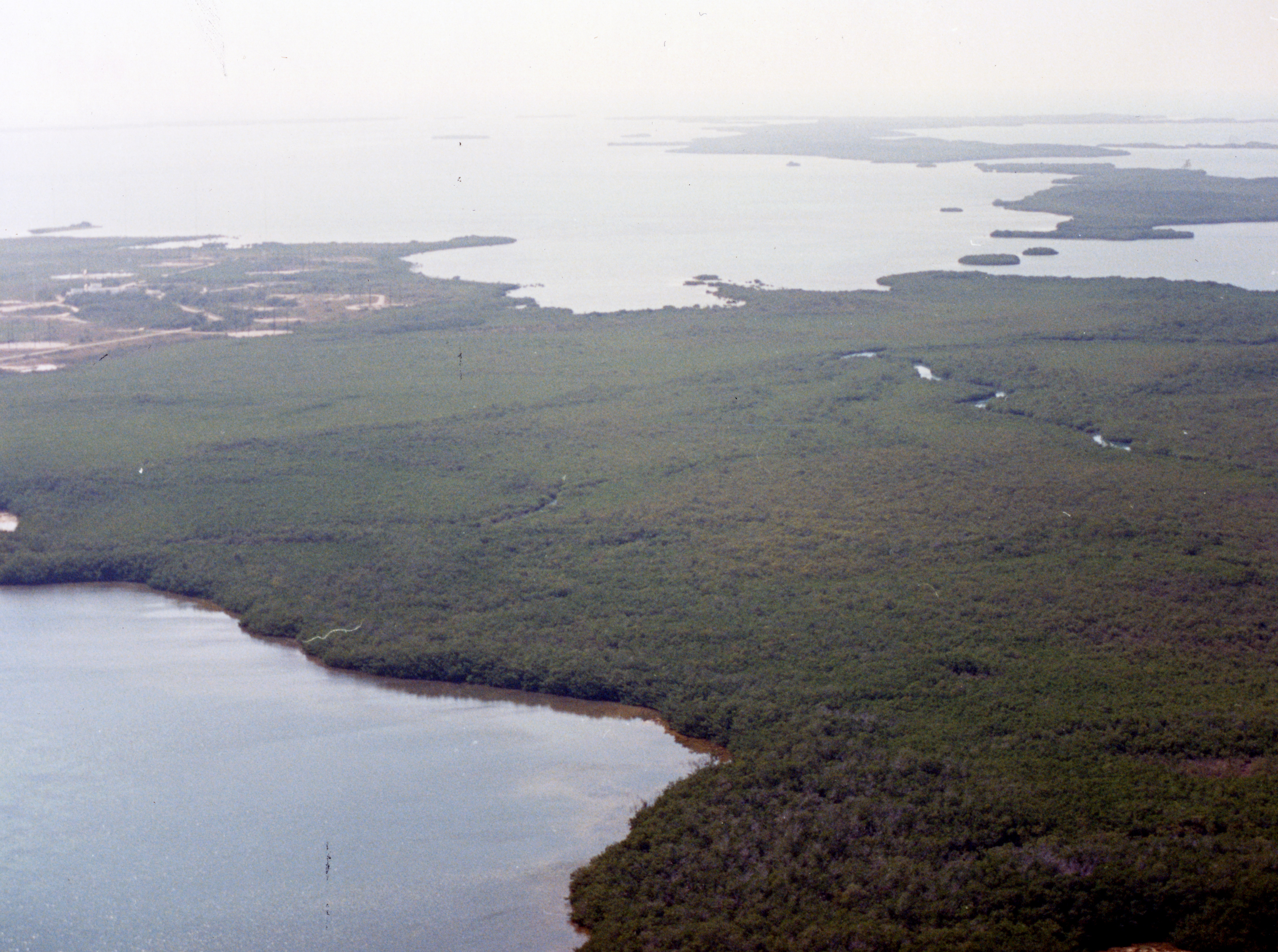
- Aerial view of Saddlebunch Keys from the northeast, October 1987

- Saddlebunch Keys Saddlebunch Keys (the Caribbean)

Geography
- Location: Gulf of Mexico
- Coordinates: 24.632584°N 81.60593°W
- Archipelago: Florida Keys
- Adjacent to: Florida Straits

Administration
- United States
- State: Florida
- County: Monroe

The Saddlebunch Keys are a series of mangrove islands about 7 miles (11 km) east of Key West, Florida.

The keys are scattered between Lower Sugarloaf Key and Shark Key.

U.S. 1 (or the Overseas Highway) crosses some of the Saddlebunches at mile markers 11.5—15.

Just east of Big Coppitt Key and Shark Key, and west of Sugarloaf Shores, is the small community of Bay Point that has fewer than 500 residents, a county park, and two stores. The community due west of Bay Point is Bluewater Key, with fewer than 100 residents. They are connected by a bike path that continues to Big Coppitt Key.
