= North Key Largo, Florida =

- Census-designated place
- Location in Monroe County and the state of Florida

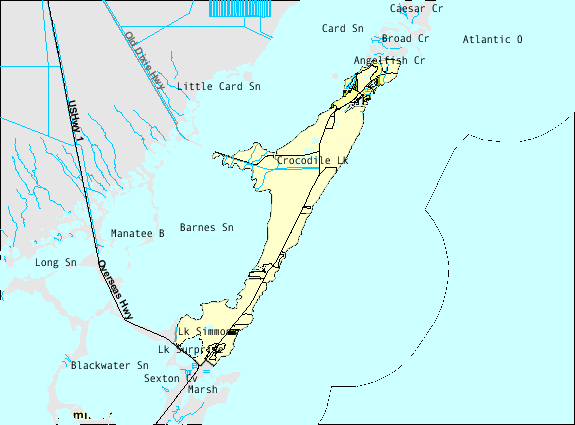
- U.S. Census Bureau map showing CDP boundaries
- Coordinates: 25°12′56″N 80°20′48″W
- Country: United States
- State: Florida
- County: Monroe

Area
  - Total: 19.58 sq mi (50.71 km^{2})
  - Land: 18.59 sq mi (48.14 km^{2})
  - Water: 0.99 sq mi (2.57 km^{2})
- Elevation: 0 ft (0 m)

Population (2020)
  - Total: 1,431
  - Density: 77.0/sq mi (29.73/km^{2})
- Time zone: UTC-5 (Eastern (EST))
  - Summer (DST): UTC-4 (EDT)
- ZIP Code: 33037 (Key Largo)
- FIPS code: 12-49406
- GNIS feature ID: 2403352

North Key Largo is an unincorporated area and census-designated place (CDP) in Monroe County, Florida, United States. The population was 1,431 at the 2020 census, up from 1,244 in 2010. It includes two private clubs, the Ocean Reef Club and the Key Largo Anglers Club, and is reached from the mainland via the Card Sound Bridge.

== Geography ==
North Key Largo is located in the northern part of the Florida Keys. It occupies the northern 13 miles (21 km) of the island of Key Largo and is bordered to the south by the community of Key Largo. To the west, separating the island from the mainland, are Barnes Sound and Card Sound. Palo Alto Key is to the north, and the Atlantic Ocean is to the east.

According to the United States Census Bureau, the North Key Largo CDP has a total area of 19.6 square miles (51 km^{2}), of which 18.6 square miles (48 km^{2}) are land and 1.0 square mile (2.6 km^{2}), or 5.07%, is water.

== Demographics ==
Historical population
Census	Pop.	Note	%±
1990	1,490		—
2000	1,049		−29.6%
2010	1,244		18.6%
2020	1,431		15.0%
U.S. Decennial Census

=== 2020 census ===
As of the 2020 census, North Key Largo had a population of 1,431. The median age was 66.4 years. 7.2% of residents were under the age of 18 and 53.7% of residents were 65 years of age or older. For every 100 females there were 87.5 males, and for every 100 females age 18 and over there were 85.2 males age 18 and over.

0.0% of residents lived in urban areas, while 100.0% lived in rural areas.

There were 714 households in North Key Largo, of which 7.8% had children under the age of 18 living in them. Of all households, 56.7% were married-couple households, 14.6% were households with a male householder and no spouse or partner present, and 23.9% were households with a female householder and no spouse or partner present. About 31.4% of all households were made up of individuals and 20.6% had someone living alone who was 65 years of age or older.

There were 1,712 housing units, of which 58.3% were vacant. The homeowner vacancy rate was 3.9% and the rental vacancy rate was 26.3%.

Racial composition as of the 2020 census
Race	Number	Percent
White	1,302	91.0%
Black or African American	5	0.3%
American Indian and Alaska Native	3	0.2%
Asian	11	0.8%
Native Hawaiian and Other Pacific Islander	1	0.1%
Some other race	22	1.5%
Two or more races	87	6.1%
Hispanic or Latino (of any race)	117	8.2%

=== 2000 census ===
As of the 2000 census, there were 1,049 people, 565 households, and 376 families living in the CDP. The population density was 21.6/km^{2} (55.9/sq mi). There were 1,620 housing units at an average density of 33.3/km^{2} (86.3/sq mi). The racial makeup of the CDP was 98.47% White, 0.76% African American, 0.19% Asian, 0.10% from other races, and 0.48% from two or more races. Hispanic or Latino of any race were 2.67% of the population.

There were 565 households, out of which 7.8% had children under the age of 18 living with them, 63.7% were married couples living together, 2.5% had a female householder with no husband present, and 33.3% were non-families. 29.7% of all households were made up of individuals, and 15.9% had someone living alone who was 65 years of age or older. The average household size was 1.86 and the average family size was 2.22.

In the CDP, the population was spread out, with 6.7% under the age of 18, 2.0% from 18 to 24, 12.0% from 25 to 44, 32.1% from 45 to 64, and 47.2% who were 65 years of age or older. The median age was 64 years. For every 100 females, there were 91.8 males. For every 100 females age 18 and over, there were 92.7 males.

The median income for a household in the CDP was $88,709, and the median income for a family was $125,000. Males had a median income of $49,861 versus $50,833 for females. The per capita income for the CDP was $83,199. None of the families and 0.5% of the population were living below the poverty line, including no under eighteens and 0.8% of those over 64.

== Education ==
It is in the Monroe County School District. It is zoned to Key Largo School (K-8).
