= Pinecrest, Monroe County, Florida =

Pinecrest, Florida
- Ghost town
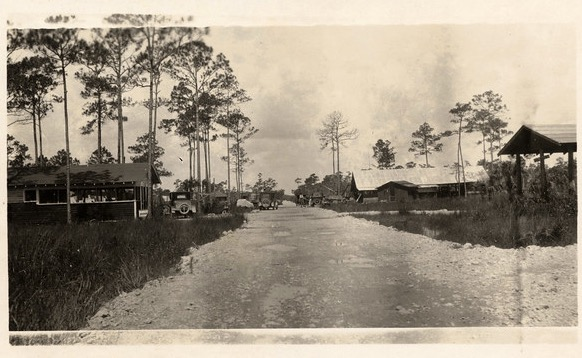

- Location within Florida Location within the United States
- Coordinates: 25.747°N 80.94°W
- Country: United States
- State: Florida
- County: Monroe
- Elevation: 6.9 ft (2.1 m)
- Time zone: UTC-5 (Eastern (EST))
  - Summer (DST): UTC-4 (EDT)

Pinecrest is a ghost town in Monroe County, Florida, United States, located in the Big Cypress National Preserve, on Loop Road, approximately 6 miles (9.7 km) west of Fortymile Bend.

== History ==
Due to the geographic disparity between Pinecrest and the county seat in Key West, Pinecrest attracted lawless elements, as well as a population involved in pursuits related to the Everglades, such as alligator hunting, fishing, and frogging. Al Capone also allegedly owned a mansion and brothel here. The area was largely abandoned as a result of hurricane destruction and the Great Depression, but a saloon, the Gator Hook, sustained until 1977, when the National Park Service began making efforts to remove private facilities in Big Cypress.

== Geography ==
It is located at 25.747°N 80.94°W, with an elevation of 7 feet (2.1 m).
