= Sugarloaf Key Bat Tower =

- Bat Tower-Sugarloaf Key
- U.S. National Register of Historic Places
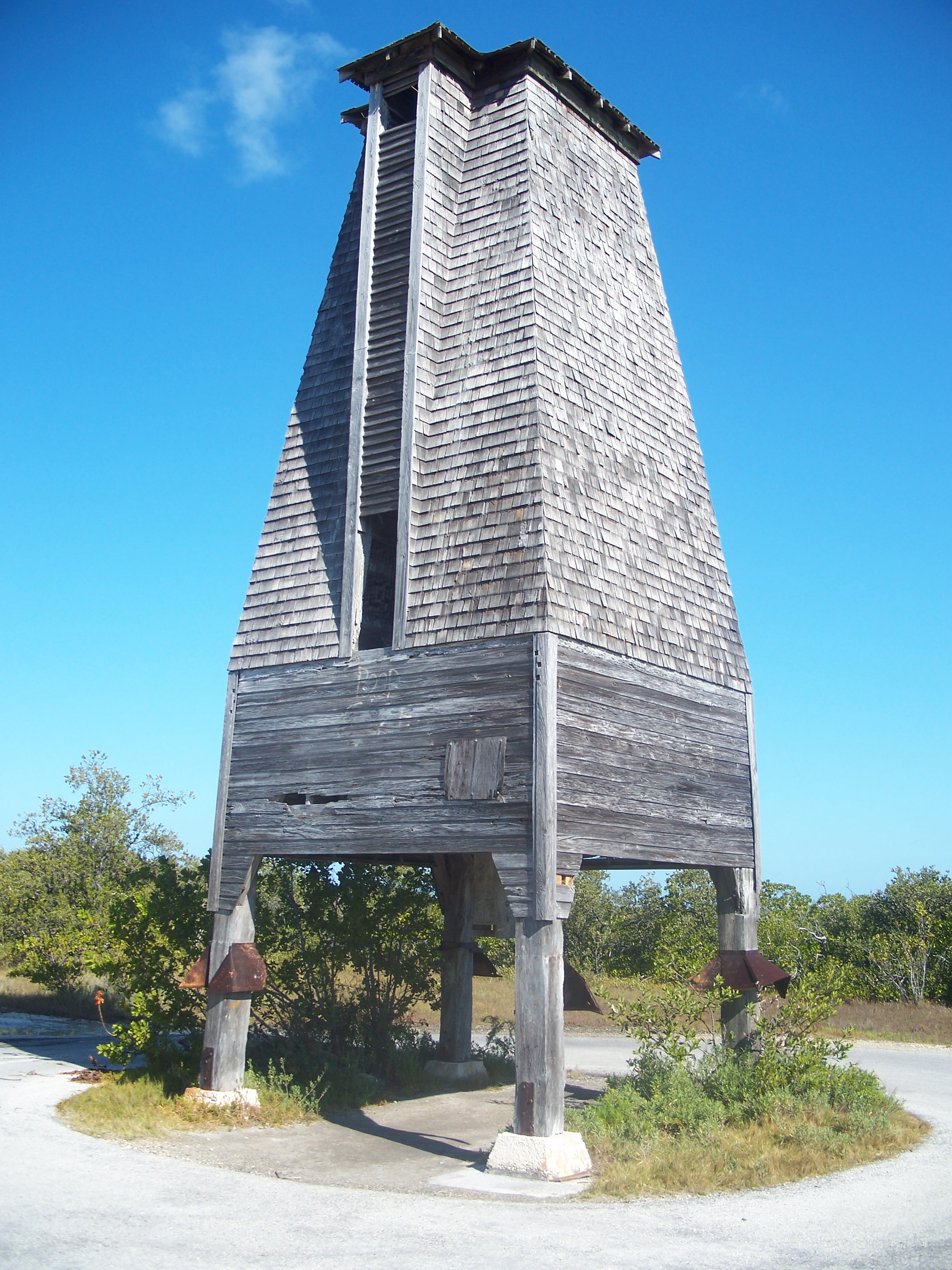
- Historic bat tower on Lower Sugarloaf Key, Florida

- Location within Florida Location within the United States
- Location: Monroe County, Florida
- Nearest city: Key West, Florida
- Coordinates: 24°38′59.95″N 81°34′21.62″W
- Built: 1929
- NRHP reference No.: 82002377
- Added to NRHP: May 13, 1982

The Sugarloaf Key Bat Tower, also known as the Perky Bat Tower, was a historic site in Monroe County, Florida, United States. It was located a mile northwest of U.S. Route 1 on Lower Sugarloaf Key at mile marker 17. On May 13, 1982, it was added to the National Register of Historic Places. The tower was blown down during Hurricane Irma in 2017.

== History ==
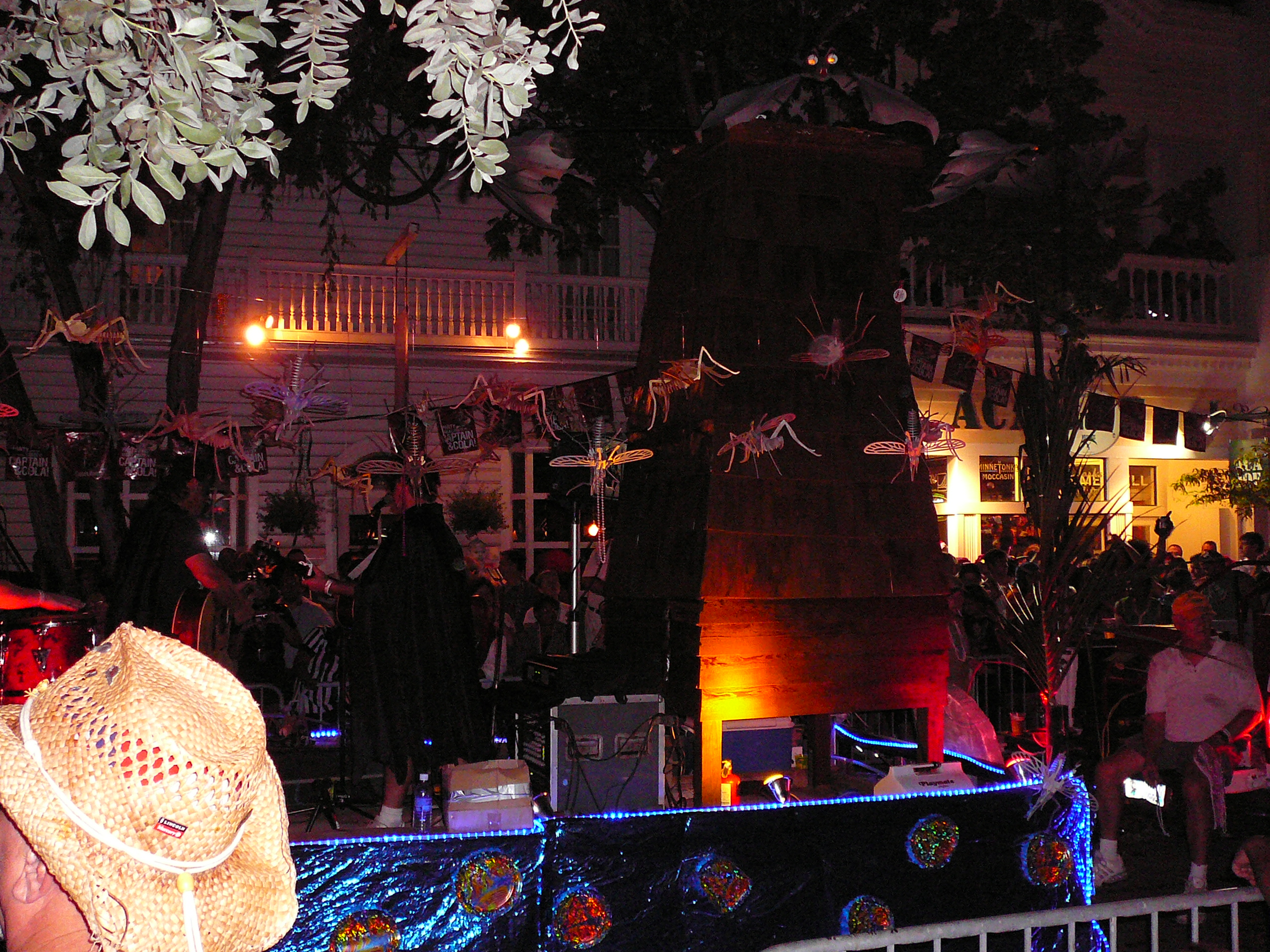
Parade float during Fantasy Fest, depicting the historic bat tower complete with bats and mosquitoes flying around it, October 2008

The tower was built in 1929 by Richter Clyde Perky, a fish lodge owner, to control the mosquito problem in the Lower Keys. However, when the bats were put in, they supposedly flew away, never to return. Attempts to bring back the bat population, including lining the tower with bait formulated from guano and the ground-up sex organs of female bats, failed. The tower was built from plans purchased from a Charles Campbell of Texas, an early pioneer of bat studies. The Hygiostatic Bat Roost, as Campbell called it, was intended to be a roost for bats that would eat the mosquitoes which spread malaria. According to at least some local folklore, the skunk ape was responsible for some early damage to the structure and for driving off some of the bats.

== Destruction and aftermath ==
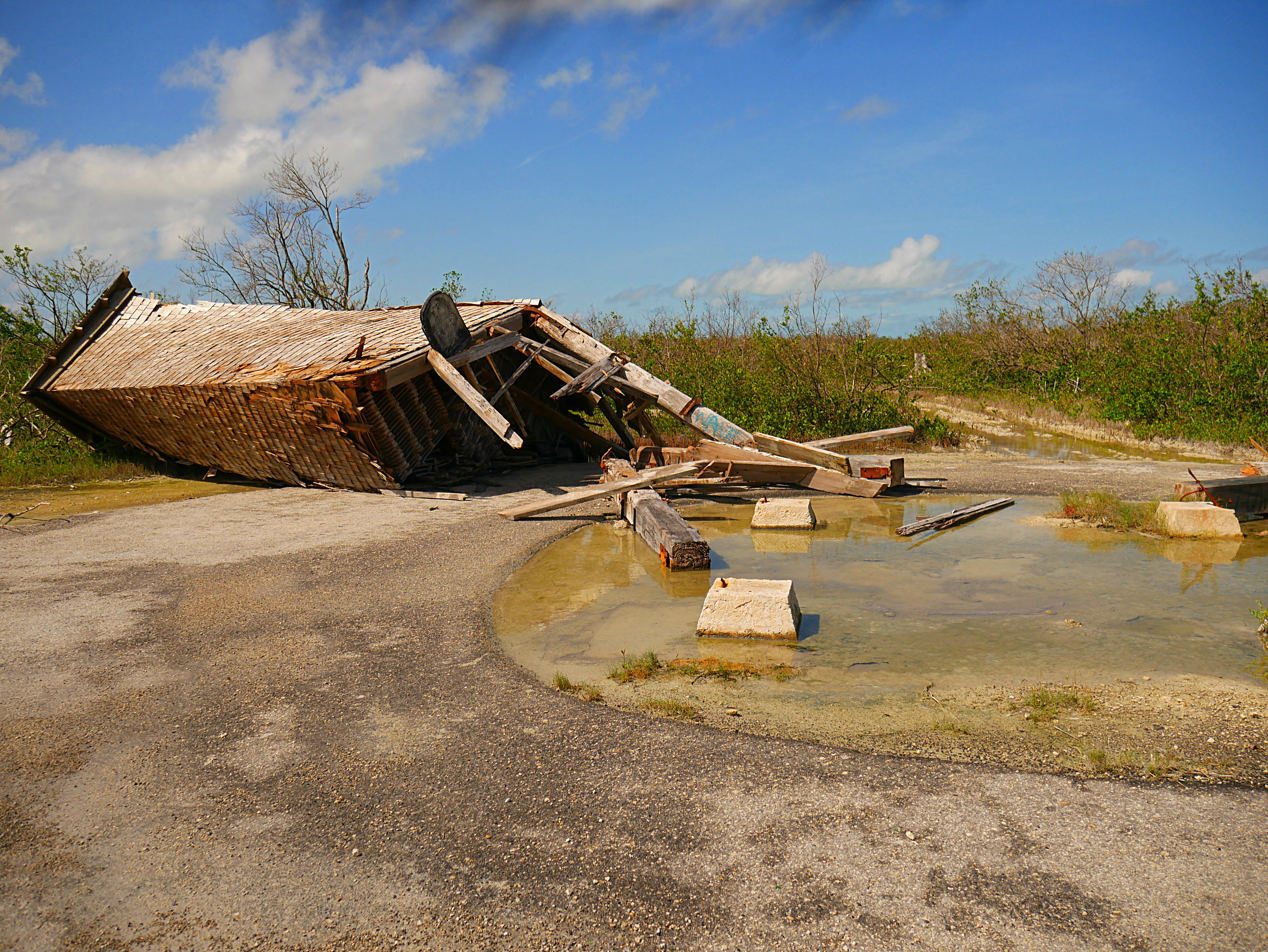
The tower after Hurricane Irma

The Sugarloaf Bat Tower was toppled over on September 10, 2017, in the devastating winds of Hurricane Irma. As of October 2017, it had not yet been decided whether it will be repaired or re-erected.

Two Campbell bat towers are still standing (out of an original fourteen worldwide) in the United States: one in Comfort, Texas; and one at the Shangri-La Gardens in Orange, Texas. At least one of the Texas towers has been internally reconstructed so that bats currently roost in it. The ruins of a fourth Campbell tower, in Temple Terrace, Florida, burned in 1979 and now consist of the concrete base and legs. Temple Terrace is in the process of rebuilding their 1924 tower.

== Cultural references ==
- The Bat Tower is used as a setting in the Tim Dorsey novel Torpedo Juice.
- Mentioned in the novel American Gods by Neil Gaiman.
- Mentioned in the novel Gumbo Limbo: An Alex Rutledge Mystery by Tom Corcoran.
- Discussed on the June 1, 2025, episode of Last Week Tonight with John Oliver
