= Great White Heron National Wildlife Refuge =

Protected area in Monroe County, Florida, United States

- IUCN category V (protected landscape/seascape)
- Location within Florida Location within the United States
- Location: Monroe County, Florida, United States
- Nearest city: Key West, Florida
- Coordinates: 24°43′N 81°38′W
- Area: 6,207 acres (2,512 ha)
- Established: October 27, 1938
- Governing body: US Fish & Wildlife Service
- Website: Great White Heron National Wildlife Refuge

The Great White Heron National Wildlife Refuge is part of the United States National Wildlife Refuge System, located in a region known as the 'Backcountry', which reaches from north of Marathon to north of Key West.

== Overview ==
The refuge is located along the north side of the Keys in that area that border the Gulf of Mexico. The 130,187 acre (527 km^{2}) refuge (6,207 acres (25 km^{2}) of it land, 123,980 (502 km^{2}) water) was established on October 27, 1938, as a haven for great white herons, migratory birds, and other wildlife Approximately 1,900 acres (8 km^{2}) are designated as a wilderness area. The refuge is administered as part of the National Key Deer Refuge.

== Flora ==
The islands are covered mostly with mangroves, though some of the larger islands contain pine rockland and tropical hardwood hammock habitats. One of the few remaining breeding colonies of the Miami blue is in the refuge.

== Fauna ==
Hawksbill sea turtles have been known to feed in the refuge. Also, loggerhead and green sea turtles nest here.

== See also ==
- List of National Wildlife Refuges
