= Lower Sugarloaf Key =

Island in the lower Florida Keys, United States

Coordinates: 24.644°N 81.563°W

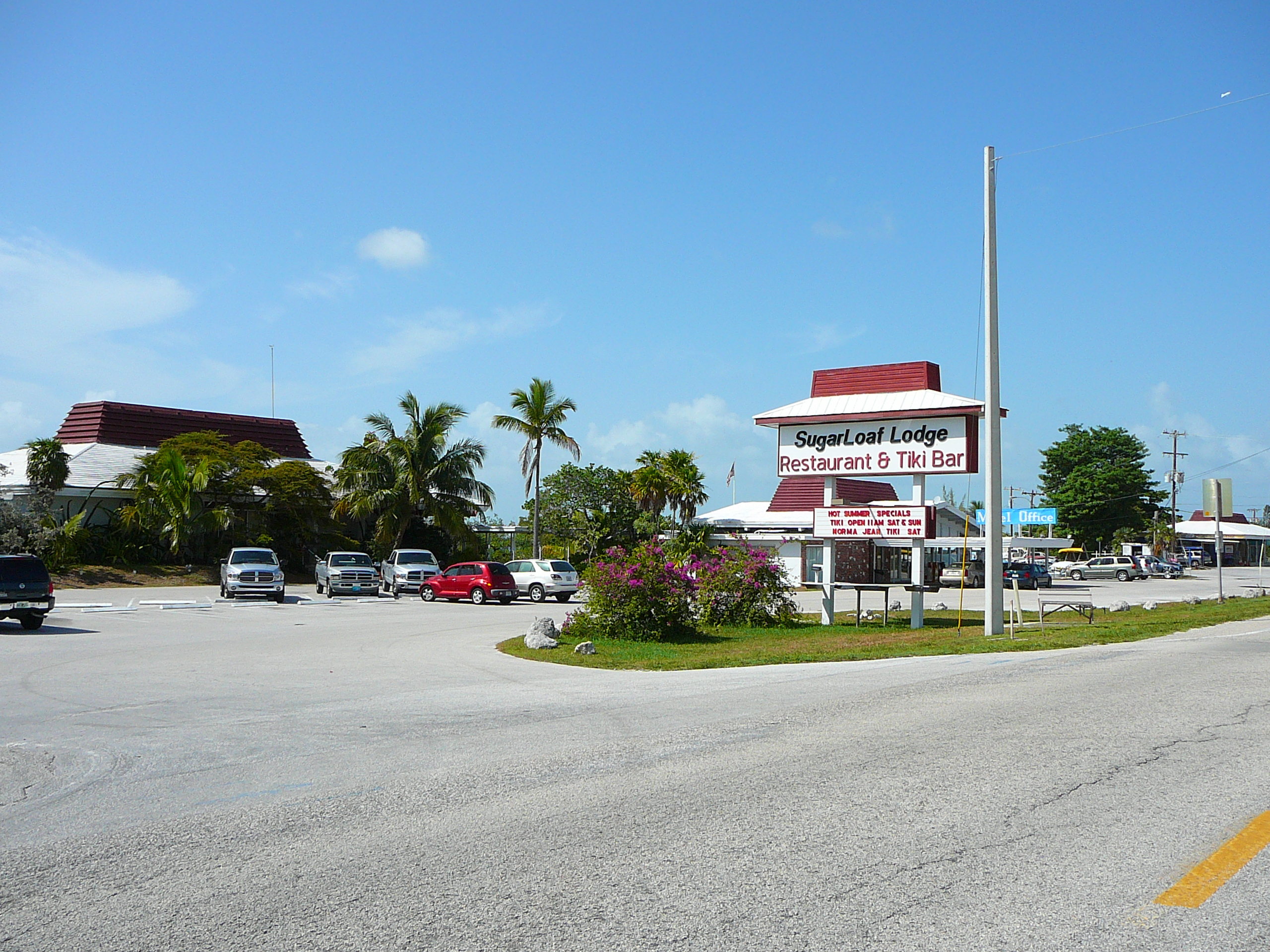
Sugarloaf Lodge on U.S. 1 on Lower Sugarloaf Key

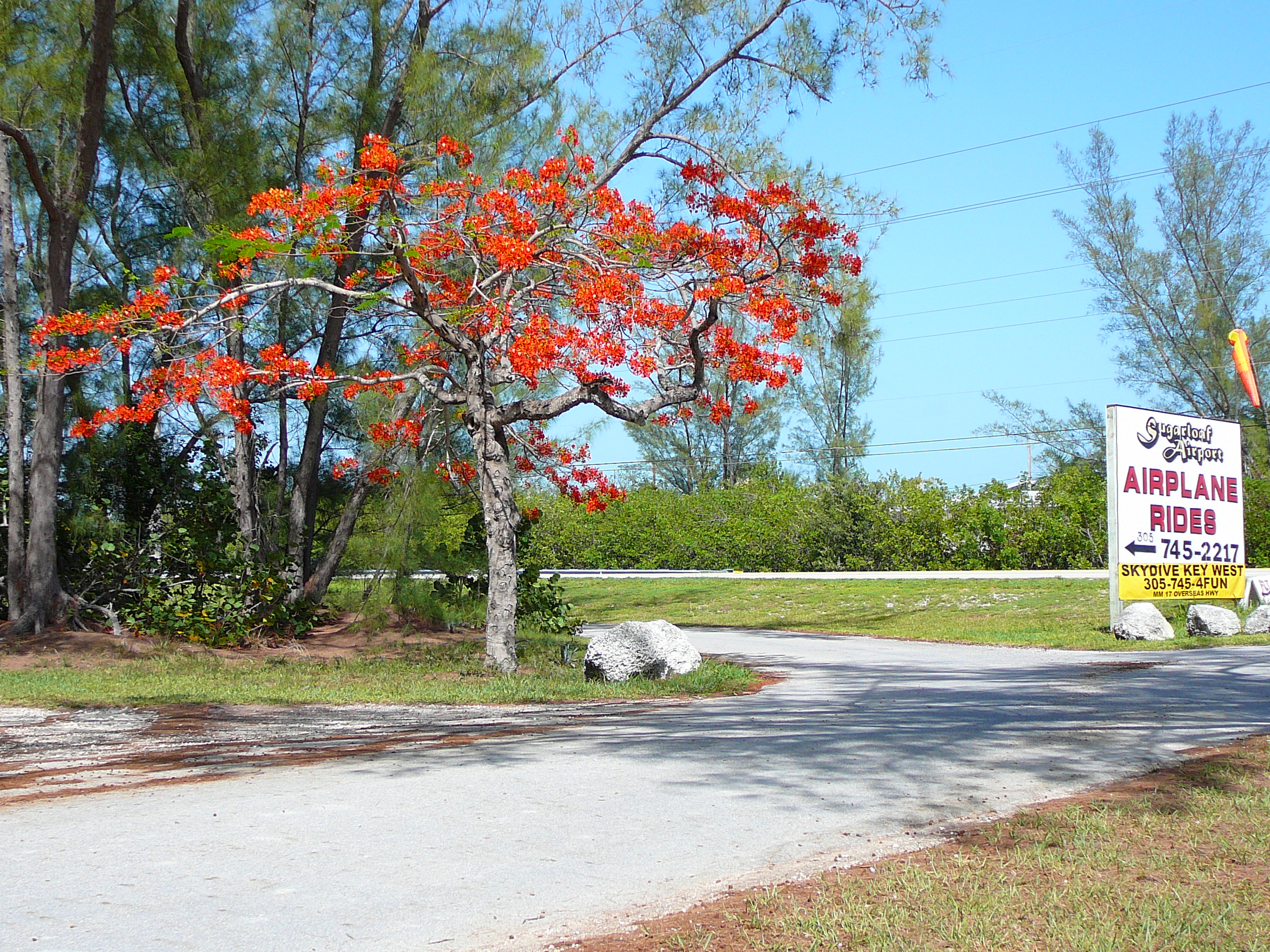
Road to Sugarloaf Airport

Lower Sugarloaf Key is the lower arm of an island known as Sugarloaf Key in the lower Florida Keys about 13 miles (21 km) east of Key West.

U.S. 1 (or the Overseas Highway) crosses the key at about mile markers 16.5–17.5. Due to the routing of U.S. Route 1, it appears that Upper Sugarloaf Key and Lower Sugarloaf Key are separate islands, but they are actually one large U-shaped island.

As its name implies, Lower Sugarloaf Key is the lower arm of Sugarloaf Key, with the upper arm being Upper Sugarloaf Key. The island makes a loop on the Atlantic side with Upper Sugarloaf Sound and Park Key in the center. Although smaller in area, than Upper Sugarloaf Key, it is more densely populated and is also called Sugarloaf Shores.

It has Sugarloaf Lodge and restaurant, an airport and a volunteer fire department.

== Sugarloaf Key Bat Tower ==
The Sugarloaf Key Bat Tower was built in 1929 and is listed as a historic site. The tower was put there by a man named Perky to control the mosquito problem in the Lower Keys, but when the bats were put in, they flew away, never to return. Mr. Perky intended to found a city named after himself, but the city did not succeed due to the local mosquitoes.

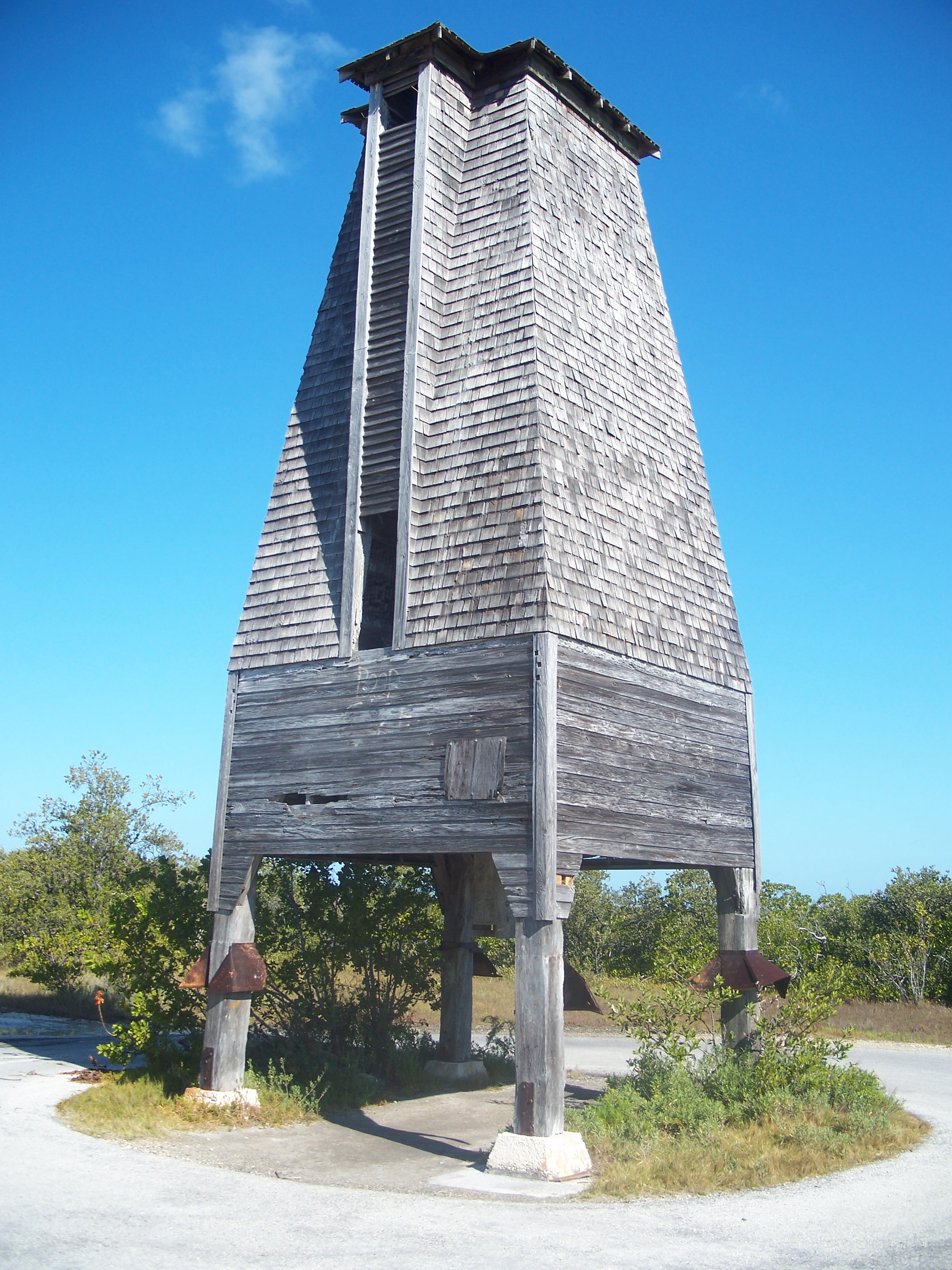
The Sugarloaf Key Bat Tower
