= Card Sound Bridge =

Bridge in Florida, United States of America

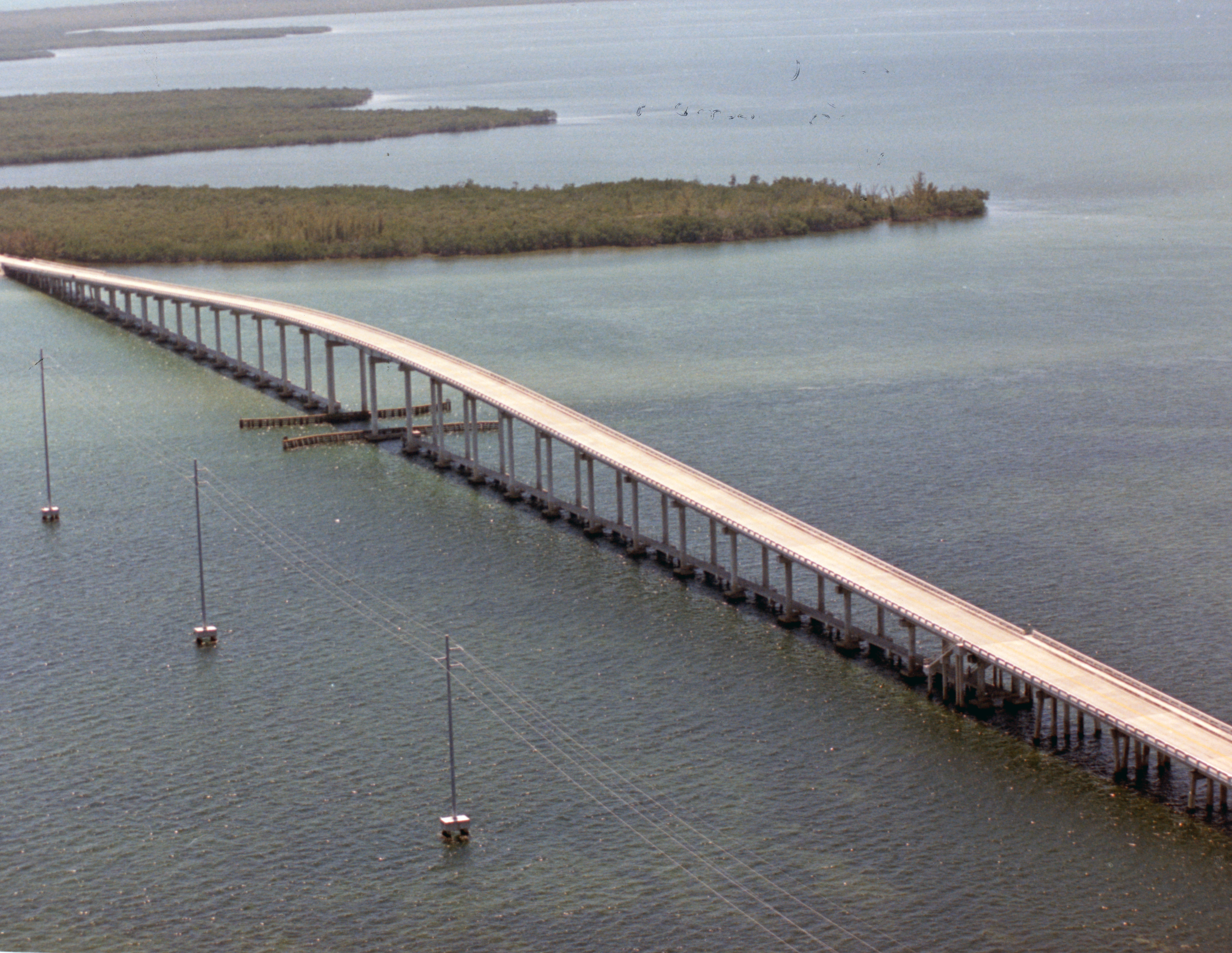
- Aerial view in 1987
- Coordinates: 25°17′14″N 80°22′07″W
- Carries: CR 905A (Card Sound Road)
- Crosses: Card Sound
- Locale: Miami-Dade County
- Maintained by: Dade and Monroe Counties

Characteristics
- Total length: 2800ft

History
- Construction cost: $2.6 million
- Opened: 1926(wooden drawbridge); 1969 (modern causeway)

Statistics
- Daily traffic: 1900 vehicles per day
- Toll: $1.50 (SunPass), $4.00 (toll by plate)

Location
- Interactive map of Card Sound Bridge

Card Sound Bridge is a high-rise toll causeway connecting southern Miami-Dade County and northern Monroe County. It is one of only two ways that motorists can leave or enter the Florida Keys (the other is U.S. Route 1). The toll for two-axle automobiles is $2.13 for two-axle vehicles: cars, pickup trucks or motorcycles. $4.08 for three axles. $1.35 per each additional axle if paid via SunPass. The prior toll plaza was demolished during Hurricane Matthew and has been replaced with a toll-by-plate plaza. The toll fee will be charged by plate automatically and sent via the mail to the address on the vehicle registration. The cashless all-electronic tolling system replaced the previous staffed toll booth on October 20, 2018. The toll fee is waived upon evacuating the Keys for hurricanes or in instances in which US 1 is impassable.

== Operation ==
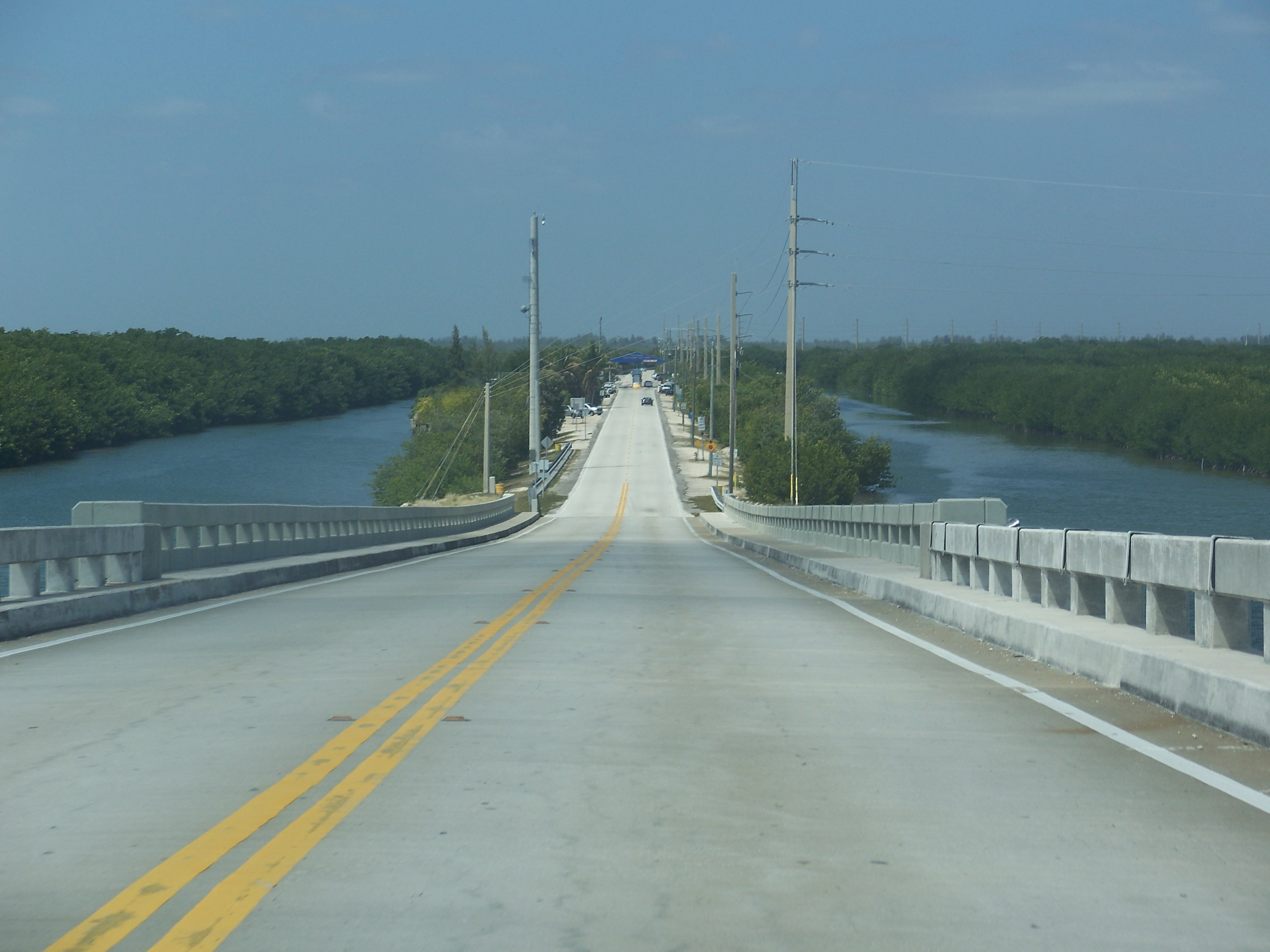
Looking west on the bridge, towards the toll station, in 2011

The primary responsibility for operating Card Sound Bridge lies with Monroe County, but maintenance of the bridge itself is shared between Monroe County and the Florida Department of Transportation. The bridge itself is on Card Sound Road, constructed by then-Dade County in 1926 for the original Card Sound Bridge. Toll employees are locals, living in a very small town along Card Sound Road on the north side of the bridge, and according to toll operators, a portion of the proceeds from the toll go to fund parts of their community. Effective August, 2017, the toll booth was closed and all employees were laid off. In December, 2017, the toll booth was removed in preparation for an automated toll booth to be installed in the spring of 2018. This is expected to save Monroe county approximately $300,000 per year in employee wages.

== Original wooden drawbridges ==
Like the Overseas Highway, the history of Card Sound Bridge begins with the Overseas Railway—although at no time was the bridge part of Henry M. Flagler's plans. The concept of an Overseas Highway (then called "Overseas Road") began with the Miami Motor Club in 1921. At that time, southern Florida was undergoing a land boom, and the club wanted to attract new tourists to an easily reached fishing area. In addition, the real estate interests wanted access to thousands of acres of wilderness in the Upper Keys to develop and sell.

Commissioners from Dade and Monroe Counties agreed to build a highway connecting Florida City to Key Largo. They preferred to build it alongside the Overseas Railroad, which was completed in 1912; commercial interests and motorists attending the joint meeting expressed a preference for a road extending to the southeast, to Card Sound, instead. In 1922, Monroe County residents approved the issuance of $300,000 of bonds for a new bridge (equivalent to $4.4 million in 2024); under an agreement with their Monroe brethren, Dade County officials would oversee the construction of an 11-mile-long (18 km) Card Sound Road to the wooden drawbridge.

Construction of both the road and the drawbridge went slowly. The money ran out in 1925 and Monroe County voters were asked to approve the issuance of $2.6 million in bonds in early 1926 (equivalent to $36.8 million in 2024). The vote—passing the measure with only two dissenting votes—enabled construction to continue.

The swing-span drawbridge and road were both nearly ready for opening when, on September 18, 1926, a major hurricane seriously damaged both. The bridge was redesigned and rebuilt, raising the water clearance from five feet to nine feet to accommodate storm surge. On January 25, 1928, the 2,800-foot (850 m) wooden Card Sound Bridge was opened to traffic.

== State Road 4A and US 1 ==
When Card Sound Bridge was opened, the State Road Department (the predecessor to the Florida Department of Transportation), extended the State Road 4A designation from downtown Homestead to Key West (prior to this, SR 4A went from the intersection of present-day U.S. Route 1 and US 41 in Miami to Homestead), even though there was still a 40-mile (64 km) gap in the road between Lower Matecumbe Key and No Name Key.

After the Great Labor Day Hurricane destroyed sections of the Overseas Railroad on September 3, 1935, the State of Florida bought the remnants for $640,000 and proceeded to construct road bridges on top of the railroad trestles. The "Overseas Highway" was completed and opened (as a toll road) on March 29, 1938. The following year, US 1 was extended from Miami over Card Sound to Key West.

== Decline and fall of the wooden drawbridge ==
By the 1940s, the bridge was considered outdated, and many defects caused by World War II led to the ultimate demise of the Bridge. In 1941, a water pipeline was constructed from the Everglades to Key Largo along the old railroad right-of-way; the following year, a new roadway was constructed beside the pipeline, and US 1 was rerouted along the new highway (locally known as the "18 Mile Stretch"). In addition to shortening the route by 13 miles (21 km), it enabled motorists to avoid the wooden bridges in northern Key Largo—including Card Sound.

A 1944 fire seriously damaged Card Sound's drawbridge, which was subsequently removed to prevent its further use; a 1947 hurricane and additional fires caused Monroe County officials to remove the Card Sound Bridge completely.

== Construction of new causeway ==
In the two decades after the removal of the Card Sound wooden drawbridge, various schemes to increase access between the Keys and mainland Florida came and went. A 22-mile (35 km)-long bridge from Cape Sable to No Name Key did not succeed due to the establishment of Everglades National Park; a monorail from Miami to Cape Sable to Key West met the same fate.

In the 1960s a plan to connect Key Biscayne to northern Key Largo by way of Elliott Key almost took root as officials from Dade and Monroe Counties differed on the division of toll revenues. In the meantime, the United States Department of the Interior started purchasing land in Biscayne Bay with an eye toward creating a new National Park. The 1968 formation of Biscayne National Monument (which became Biscayne National Park in 1980) hastened the demise of the "Islandia plan" (named after a sparsely populated municipality on Elliott Key), but one component of the proposal survived: a new 65-foot (20 m)-high causeway to be the new Card Sound Bridge.

The new causeway was completed and open to traffic in 1969. Card Sound Road became State Road 905A, a FDOT designation which was modified to SR S-905A in the mid-1970s. In the early 1980s, Card Sound Road was transferred to county maintenance in both Dade and Monroe Counties, although the stretch on northern Key Largo between Ocean Reef Club and US 1 is still "State Road 905" in Monroe County ordinances passed in the 2000s. Actually, County Road 905A has its northern terminus at an intersection with US 1 in Florida City and its southern terminus at County Road 905 in northern Key Largo five miles (8.0 km) to the east of Card Sound Bridge (CR 905 continues southwestward eight miles (13 km) until it joins US 1). Both CR 905 and 905A on Key Largo still show FDOT signs indicating State routes on their shoulders.

As of 2016, Card Sound Bridge is traversed by 3500 vehicles daily.
