= Monroe County, Florida =

County in Florida, United States

- County
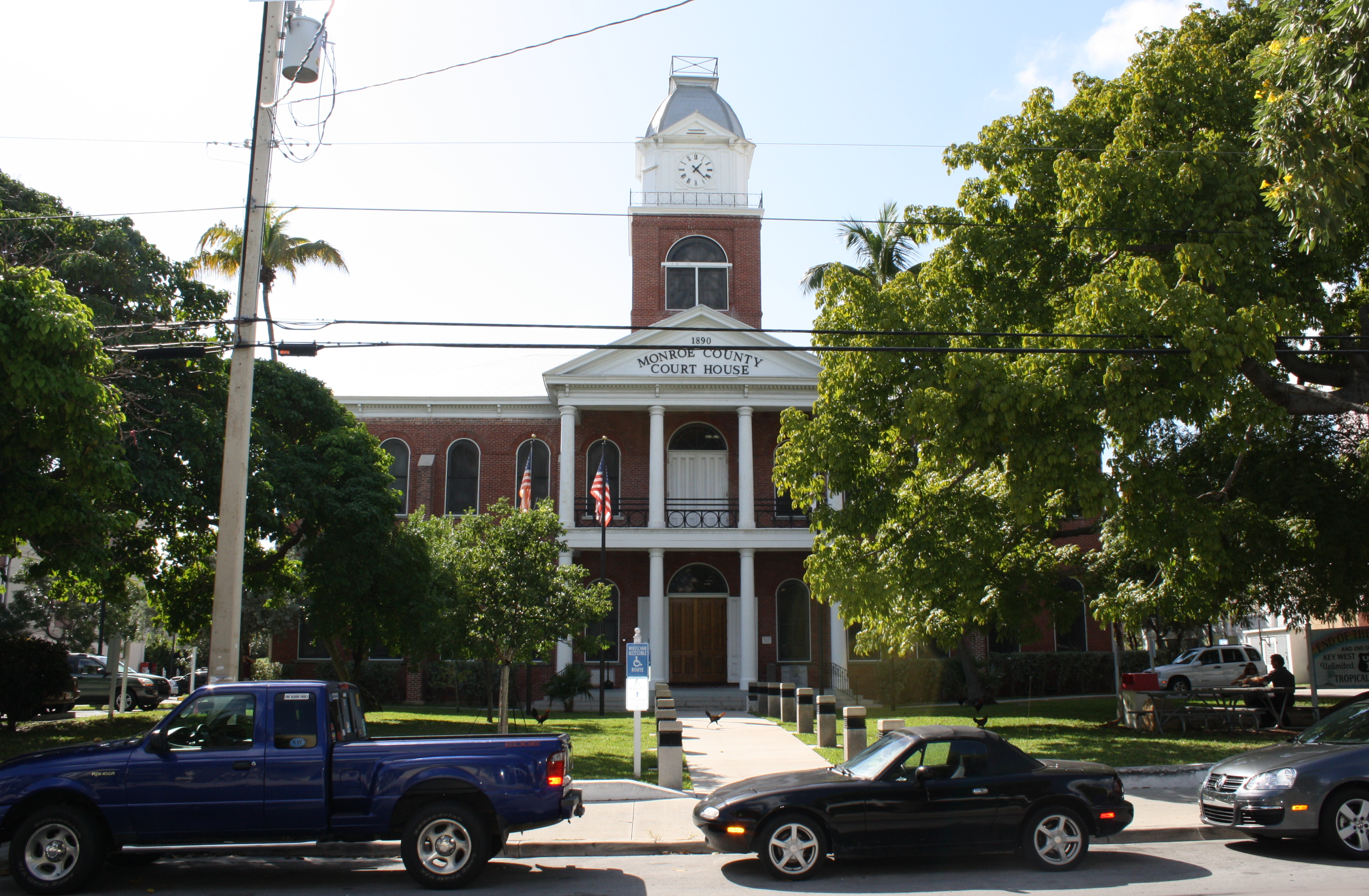
- The Monroe County Courthouse in Key West

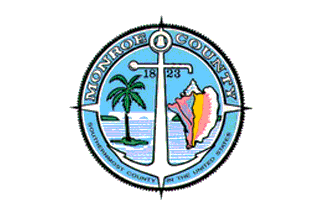
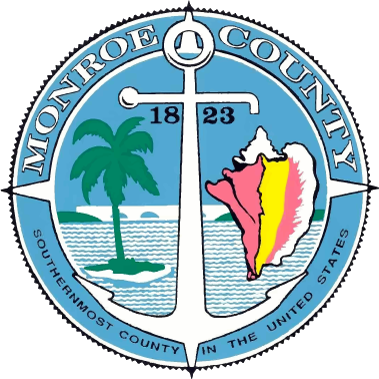
- Flag Seal

- Location within the U.S. state of Florida
- Coordinates: 25°07′N 81°09′W
- Country: United States
- State: Florida
- Founded: July 3, 1823
- Named for: James Monroe
- Seat: Key West
- Largest city: Key West

Area
  - Total: 3,738 sq mi (9,680 km^{2})
  - Land: 983 sq mi (2,550 km^{2})
  - Water: 2,754 sq mi (7,130 km^{2}) 73.7%

Population (2020)
  - Total: 82,874
  - Estimate (2025): 80,406 ▼
  - Density: 84.3/sq mi (32.6/km^{2})
- Time zone: UTC−5 (Eastern)
  - Summer (DST): UTC−4 (EDT)
- Congressional district: 28th
- Website: www.monroecounty-fl.gov

Monroe County is the southernmost county of the state of Florida. As of the 2020 census, the population was 82,874. Its county seat is Key West. Monroe County includes the islands of the Florida Keys and comprises the Key West-Key Largo Micropolitan Statistical Area. Over 99.9% of the county's population lives on the Florida Keys. The mainland, which is part of the Everglades, comprises 87% of the county's land area and is virtually uninhabited with only 17 people recorded in the 2020 census.

== History ==
Monroe County was created in 1823. It was named for James Monroe, the fifth president of the United States from 1817 to 1825.

== Geography ==
According to the U.S. Census Bureau, the county has a total area of 3,738 square miles (9,680 km^{2}), of which 983 square miles (2,550 km^{2}) (26.3%) is land and 2,754 square miles (7,130 km^{2}) (73.7%) is water. It is the largest county in Florida by total area.

More than 99.9 percent of the Monroe County population lives in the island chain known as the Florida Keys.

Two thirds of the large area in what local residents call "mainland Monroe" is uninhabited by virtue of being part of the Everglades National Park, and the remainder by the Big Cypress National Preserve in the northeastern interior. The area, officially named Cape Sable Census County Division, is virtually uninhabited. This area has 87.4 percent of the county's land area (859.6 out of 983 sq mi (2,546 km^{2})), but it had only 0.022 percent of the county's population (18 out of 82,170) as of the 2021 American Community Survey. The Census Bureau defines this area as Census Tract 9800 of Monroe County, Florida.

In mainland Monroe, the only three populated places appearing on detailed maps and in the USGS geographic name database are Flamingo, Pinecrest, (not to be confused with much larger Pinecrest of neighboring Miami-Dade County), and Trail City. Flamingo, on the south coast and at the end of State Road 9336 (Flamingo Lodge Highway), is the location of the Flamingo Lodge and the Flamingo Ranger Station (with Visitor Center & Marina). 7 mi (11 km) northeast on the highway is the West Lake Trail (station). Pinecrest, located in the northern interior of the county (in the Big Cypress National Preserve) on Loop Road (given that name since it forms a loop with U.S. Highway 41 further north), hosts the Loop Road Education Center. Trail City is 4 mi (6 km) west of Pinecrest on Loop Road. Loop Road can be found on most maps as CR 94, although the roadway no longer has a numbered designation and is now managed by the National Park Service.

Between the south coast of Florida's mainland and the Florida Keys is Florida Bay, which is encompassed by the Everglades National Park and contains numerous islets or keys.

The county is coterminous with the Key West-Key Largo, Florida Micropolitan Statistical Area (μSA), with Key Largo and Key West designated as principal cities. The μSA was first defined in 2003 as the Key West-Marathon, Florida Micropolitan Statistical Area. The name was changed to Key West, Florida Micropolitan Statistical Area in 2006, and to Key West-Key Largo, Florida Micropolitan Statistical Area in 2023. The μSA is part of the Miami-Port Saint Lucie-Fort Lauderdale Combined Statistical Area.

=== Adjacent counties ===
- Collier County – north (on mainland)
- Miami-Dade County – east (on mainland) and north (over water)

=== Protected areas ===
- Bahia Honda State Park
- Big Cypress National Preserve
- Crocodile Lake National Wildlife Refuge
- Curry Hammock State Park
- Dagny Johnson Key Largo Hammock Botanical State Park
- Dry Tortugas National Park
- Everglades National Park
- Fort Zachary Taylor Historic State Park
- Great White Heron National Wildlife Refuge
- Indian Key State Historic Site
- John Pennekamp Coral Reef State Park
- Key West National Wildlife Refuge
- Lignumvitae Key Botanical State Park
- Long Key State Park
- National Key Deer Refuge
- San Pedro Underwater Archaeological Preserve State Park
- Windley Key Fossil Reef Geological State Park

== Demographics ==
Historical population
Census	Pop.	Note	%±
1830	517		—
1840	688		33.1%
1850	2,645		284.4%
1860	2,913		10.1%
1870	5,657		94.2%
1880	10,940		93.4%
1890	18,786		71.7%
1900	18,006		−4.2%
1910	21,563		19.8%
1920	19,550		−9.3%
1930	13,624		−30.3%
1940	14,078		3.3%
1950	29,957		112.8%
1960	47,921		60.0%
1970	52,586		9.7%
1980	63,188		20.2%
1990	78,024		23.5%
2000	79,589		2.0%
2010	73,090		−8.2%
2020	82,874		13.4%
2025 (est.)	80,406	▼	−3.0%
U.S. Decennial Census; 1790–1960 1900–1990; 1990–2000 2010–2019 2020

=== 2020 census ===
As of the 2020 census, there were 82,874 people, 36,436 households, and 18,586 families residing in the county. The median age was 49.7 years; 14.8% of residents were under the age of 18 and 23.4% were 65 years of age or older. For every 100 females there were 107.1 males, and for every 100 females age 18 and over there were 107.7 males.

The racial makeup of the county was 72.6% White, 5.8% Black or African American, 0.4% American Indian and Alaska Native, 1.4% Asian, 0.1% Native Hawaiian and Pacific Islander, 4.7% from some other race, and 15.1% from two or more races. Hispanic or Latino residents of any race comprised 23.4% of the population.

86.9% of residents lived in urban areas, while 13.1% lived in rural areas.

Of those households, 20.9% had children under the age of 18 living in them, 46.0% were married-couple households, 22.9% were households with a male householder and no spouse or partner present, and 21.7% were households with a female householder and no spouse or partner present. About 29.1% of all households were made up of individuals and 12.6% had someone living alone who was 65 years of age or older.

There were 53,961 housing units, of which 32.5% were vacant. Among occupied housing units, 60.5% were owner-occupied and 39.5% were renter-occupied. The homeowner vacancy rate was 3.4% and the rental vacancy rate was 13.1%.

=== Racial and ethnic composition ===
Monroe County, Florida – Racial and ethnic composition Note: the US Census treats Hispanic/Latino as an ethnic category. This table excludes Latinos from the racial categories and assigns them to a separate category. Hispanics/Latinos may be of any race.
Race / Ethnicity (NH = Non-Hispanic)	Pop 1980	Pop 1990	Pop 2000	Pop 2010	Pop 2020	% 1980	% 1990	% 2000	% 2010	% 2020
White alone (NH)	51,564	63,686	61,462	52,089	54,731	81.60%	81.62%	77.22%	71.27%	66.04%
Black or African American alone (NH)	3,596	3,896	3,567	3,851	4,517	5.69%	4.99%	4.48%	5.27%	5.45%
Native American or Alaska Native alone (NH)	144	233	272	247	169	0.23%	0.30%	0.34%	0.34%	0.20%
Asian alone (NH)	625	596	645	782	1,137	0.99%	0.76%	0.81%	1.07%	1.37%
Native Hawaiian or Pacific Islander alone (NH)	x	x	31	60	61	x	x	0.04%	0.08%	0.07%
Other race alone (NH)	100	33	110	76	407	0.16%	0.04%	0.14%	0.10%	0.49%
Mixed race or Multiracial (NH)	x	x	949	914	2,420	x	x	1.19%	1.25%	2.92%
Hispanic or Latino (any race)	7,159	9,580	12,553	15,071	19,432	11.33%	12.28%	15.77%	20.62%	23.45%
Total	63,188	78,024	79,589	73,090	82,874	100.00%	100.00%	100.00%	100.00%	100.00%

=== 2010 census ===
As of the census of 2010, there were 73,090 people, 32,629 households, and 18,219 families living in the county. The racial makeup of the county was 89.5% White (71.3% Non-Hispanic White), 5.7% Black or African American, 0.4% Native American, 1.1% Asian, 0.1% Pacific Islander, 1.4% from other races, and 1.8% from two or more races. 20.6% of the population were Hispanic or Latino of any race.

=== 2000 census ===
As of the census of 2000, there were 79,589 people, 35,086 households, and 20,384 families living in the county. The population density was 80 people per square mile (31 people/km^{2}). There were 51,617 housing units at an average density of 52 per square mile (20/km^{2}). The racial makeup of the county was 90.65% White, 4.77% Black or African American, 0.38% Native American, 0.83% Asian, 0.04% Pacific Islander, 1.55% from other races, and 1.78% from two or more races. 15.77% of the population were Hispanic or Latino of any race.

In 2005 Monroe County's population was 75.1% non-Hispanic white, 17.7% Hispanic or Latino, 5.4% African-American and 1.1% Asian.

In 2000 there were 35,086 households, out of which 20.80% had children under the age of 18 living with them, 46.80% were married couples living together, 7.30% had a female householder with no husband present, and 41.90% were non-families. 28.80% of all households were made up of individuals, and 8.20% had someone living alone who was 65 years of age or older. The average household size was 2.23 and the average family size was 2.73.

In the county, 17.10% of the population was under the age of 18, 6.30% was from 18 to 24, 31.10% from 25 to 44, 30.90% from 45 to 64, and 14.60% was 65 years of age or older. The median age was 43 years. For every 100 females there were 113.90 males. For every 100 females age 18 and over, there were 114.80 males.

The median income for a household in the county was $42,283, and the median income for a family was $50,734. Males had a median income of $31,266 versus $25,709 for females. The per capita income for the county was $26,102. About 6.80% of families and 10.20% of the population were below the poverty line, including 11.80% of those under age 18 and 8.80% of those age 65 or over.

=== Languages ===
As of 2010, 77.57% spoke only English at home, while 17.56% spoke Spanish, 0.96% French Creole (mainly Haitian Creole), 0.74% French, and 0.50% spoke Russian at home. In total, 22.43% of the population spoke a language other than English at home.

== Transportation ==
=== Airports ===
- Key West International Airport
- Florida Keys Marathon Airport

=== Major highways ===
Due to the county being a national park on the mainland and a chain of islands, there are no interstates.

- US 1 / SR 5 (Overseas Highway)
- SR A1A (Roosevelt Boulevard)
- CR 905 (Key Largo Drive)
- CR 905A (Card Sound Road)

== Public safety ==
The Monroe County Sheriff's Office (MCSO) is the law enforcement agency responsible for Monroe County and is the county's largest law enforcement agency.

Monroe County Fire Rescue (MCFR) provides fire protection and emergency medical services throughout the county. Monroe County Fire Rescue has 9 stations placed around the county. Their headquarters, located in Marathon, holds the MCFR administration. Monroe County Fire Rescue conducts all fire inspections within the unincorporated portions of the county, with the exclusion of Key Largo.

Key West: The Key West Fire Department provides fire protection and emergency medical services throughout Key West, Florida. The Key West Fire Department has 4 stations placed throughout the city. The Key West Police Department is the responsible law enforcement agency within the incorporated City of Key West.

Marathon: Monroe County Fire Rescue provides fire protection and emergency medical services throughout Marathon, Florida. The Marathon Fire Department has 2 stations placed throughout the city. The Monroe County Sheriff's Office is responsible for law enforcement within the City of Marathon.

Key Colony Beach: The Monroe County Fire Rescue Department provides fire protection and emergency medical services throughout Key Colony Beach, Florida. The Key Colony Beach Police Department is the responsible for law enforcement within the City of Key Colony Beach.

Islamorada: The Islamorada Fire Department provides fire protection and emergency medical services throughout Islamorada, Florida, with 3 stations within the Village. The Monroe County Sheriff's Office is responsible for law enforcement within the Village of Islamorada.

Key Largo: Even as an unincorporated community, Key Largo, Florida, maintains their own fire district, with 2 stations placed around the community. The Monroe County Sheriff's Office is responsible for law enforcement within the community of Key Largo.

== Culture ==
Monroe County cultural organizations include the Key West Literary Seminar, The Studios of Key West, the Red Barn Theatre, Key West Symphony, Sculpture Key West, Fantasy Fest, the San Carlos Institute, Hemingway House and Museum, Customs House Museum, and Key West Art and Historical Society.

The Florida Keys Council for the Arts is the primary cultural umbrella for the Florida Keys, and serves the population from Key Largo to Key West. A non-profit local arts agency, it makes grants, operates the Monroe County Art in Public Places program, sponsors seminars, and manages the online cultural calendar for the region. It also manages the county's Tourism Development Council arts marketing grants and serves as a leading advocate for cultural tourism in lower Florida. In 1998, the Florida Keys Council of the Arts was designated by the Board of Monroe County Commissioners as the area's Local Arts Agency as provided by Florida Statute 286.011. Established in 1997 as the Monroe Council of the Arts Corporation, the name was changed to the Florida Keys Council of the Arts on 2 October 2001. Today the organization is the liaison among cultural organizations, all levels of government and the private sector in encouraging and promoting the arts throughout Monroe County. The council endeavors to make the arts a part of the fabric of daily life. From its inception through fiscal year end 2006, FKCA has awarded $433,916 in privately raised funds and grants to literary, visual and performing artists and cultural organizations. Add to that sum the Cultural Umbrella event funding, the South Florida Cultural Consortium Visual & Media Artists Fellowships and The Art in Public Places commissions, and the total distributed in the Keys cultural community through FKCA's efforts come to $2.5 million to date. The annual economic impact of the non-profit cultural community in the Keys is estimated at over $22 million. The Florida Keys Council of the Arts, with a 501 (c) (3) status in a public-private partnership with local county government since 1997 serves 76,329 local residents and three million visitors annually.

== Education ==
The Monroe County School District serves the entire county, as well as several private schools for primary and secondary education.

Florida Keys Community College is the primary college education provider with main campus in Key West, Florida. FKCC also operates two additional campuses in the Florida Keys; one in Marathon and another in Key Largo.

== Government ==
=== Politics ===
Like much of the Solid South, in the first two-thirds of the 20th century, Monroe was a solidly Democratic county, supporting landslide losers like James M. Cox and John W. Davis. However, unlike most Southern Democrats, Monroe County voters tended to be far more liberal on social issues such as civil rights and later gay rights, voting decisively for Lyndon B. Johnson in 1964 and even supporting Hubert Humphrey in 1968, one of only three Florida counties to do so. Four years later, however, Richard Nixon easily carried the county in his 1972 landslide re-election, becoming the first Republican winner since 1888 by receiving over 70% of the vote.

Since the 1970s, Monroe County has been a competitive swing county in presidential elections. Although Monroe voted for the Democratic candidate from 1992 to 2012, it was won by consistently narrow margins, such as 0.5% in 2004 and 2012. Barack Obama in 2008 was the first candidate for president to win a majority, 51.7%, of the vote since George H. W. Bush's national landslide victory in 1988. In 2016, Donald Trump became the first Republican to carry the county in almost three decades, winning a majority and winning it by an even larger margin than Obama had won it by in 2008. In 2020, he won it by a still wider margin, and in 2024 he won by double digits.

Monroe County is home to a large LGBT community, particularly in Key West. Due to the influence of this community, Monroe County was the only county in Florida to reject 2008 Florida Amendment 2, which banned same-sex marriage and civil unions in the state. The amendment passed in the state with 60% of the vote.

United States presidential election results for Monroe County, Florida
Year	Republican		Democratic		Third party(ies)	
Year	No.	%	No.	%	No.	%
1892	0	0.00%	767	90.98%	76	9.02%
1896	369	40.73%	452	49.89%	85	9.38%
1900	252	22.36%	747	66.28%	128	11.36%
1904	287	25.83%	680	61.21%	144	12.96%
1908	227	19.47%	630	54.03%	309	26.50%
1912	414	22.55%	1,023	55.72%	399	21.73%
1916	345	24.11%	730	51.01%	356	24.88%
1920	510	29.19%	979	56.04%	258	14.77%
1924	262	21.27%	835	67.78%	135	10.96%
1928	1,142	36.93%	1,899	61.42%	51	1.65%
1932	336	10.59%	2,838	89.41%	0	0.00%
1936	282	9.77%	2,605	90.23%	0	0.00%
1940	463	10.14%	4,102	89.86%	0	0.00%
1944	566	12.72%	3,882	87.28%	0	0.00%
1948	548	12.17%	3,759	83.48%	196	4.35%
1952	2,943	37.33%	4,941	62.67%	0	0.00%
1956	3,337	43.54%	4,327	56.46%	0	0.00%
1960	3,416	32.88%	6,972	67.12%	0	0.00%
1964	4,842	35.14%	8,936	64.86%	0	0.00%
1968	5,094	34.19%	5,534	37.14%	4,271	28.67%
1972	11,688	72.18%	4,469	27.60%	36	0.22%
1976	8,232	41.67%	11,079	56.08%	446	2.26%
1980	11,644	53.40%	7,920	36.32%	2,242	10.28%
1984	16,332	67.73%	7,774	32.24%	9	0.04%
1988	15,928	60.32%	10,157	38.47%	320	1.21%
1992	9,898	34.38%	10,450	36.30%	8,441	29.32%
1996	12,076	37.11%	15,251	46.86%	5,217	16.03%
2000	16,063	47.39%	16,487	48.64%	1,345	3.97%
2004	19,467	49.24%	19,654	49.71%	414	1.05%
2008	18,933	46.86%	20,907	51.75%	563	1.39%
2012	19,234	49.12%	19,404	49.56%	516	1.32%
2016	21,904	50.97%	18,971	44.14%	2,102	4.89%
2020	25,693	53.38%	21,881	45.46%	561	1.17%
2024	26,064	58.57%	17,933	40.30%	505	1.13%

Monroe County is politically divided by geography, with Key West voting reliably Democratic, Stock Island a swing area, and the rest of the archipelago voting reliably Republican. The western part of Key West is more strongly Democratic than the eastern part of the island.

On July 17, 2014, a county court judge ruled the state's ban on same sex marriage unconstitutional, ordering the county clerk of court to issue marriage licenses on July 22, 2014.

=== Libraries ===
The Monroe County Public Library system serves residents of the Florida Keys in five locations: Key West, Big Pine, Marathon, Key Largo, and Islamorada.

The Monroe County Public Library provides various programs and services to the Monroe County community, including job finding tools. There is a program that preserves the history of the Keys for use by customers. In 2010 the library worked to digitize historical photographs of the Keys.

Annual visitors cards can be purchased for $30. The library provides access to PCs with internet and word processing capabilities. The library also provides free Wi-Fi for all.

The Monroe County Public Library is served by the Miami-Dade County subregional library of Florida Bureau of Braille and Talking Books Library.

== Economy ==
54% of the people in the county work in the tourism industry. In 2016, tourism brought $2.7 billion to the county.

== Communities ==

=== Cities ===
- Key West (1)
- Marathon (2)
- Key Colony Beach (3)
- Layton (4)

=== Village ===
- Islamorada (5)

=== Census-designated places ===
- Stock Island (a)
- Big Coppitt Key (b)
- Cudjoe Key (c)
- Big Pine Key (d)
- Duck Key (e)
- Tavernier (f)
- Key Largo (g)
- North Key Largo (h)

=== Other unincorporated areas ===
- Flamingo (i)
- Bay Point (j)
- Sugarloaf Shores (k)
- Marquesas Keys (l)
- Bahia Honda Key (m)
- Everglades (n)

=== Former communities ===
- Chevelier
- Craig
- Fort Jefferson
- Indian Key
- Perky
- Poinciana
- Pigeon Key
- Pinecrest

== See also ==
- National Register of Historic Places listings in Monroe County, Florida
- Key West
