= Oleta =

Oleta, a name coming from Old English meaning "winged one", may refer to:

== People ==
- Oleta Kirk Abrams, one of the three founders of Bay Area Women Against Rape, the first rape crisis center in the U.S.
- Oleta Adams, American soul, jazz, and gospel singer and pianist
- Oleta Crain (1913–2007), African-American military officer and federal civil servant

== Places ==
- Oleta River, river situated north of Miami that drains the northern Everglades into Biscayne Bay
- Oleta River State Park, largest urban park in the Florida State Park system
- Fiddletown, California, formerly Oleta
