= Interama (exhibition) =

Planned international exposition

Interama (originally known as the Inter-American Cultural and Trade Center) was a planned international exposition which would have been in Miami, Florida. From the start, the Inter-American Center was conceived as a permanent international exposition of the Americas with cultural, educational, and trade activities, thereby combining the features of an amusement park, world's fair and trade fair.

As a permanent exposition, Interama would have showcased the culture, businesses, government and arts of countries from South America, Central America, North America, and parts of Africa and Europe.

== Conception ==
Recognizing Miami's increasing importance as a commercial and cultural hemispheric hub, business and civic leaders proposed the construction of a Pan-American trade mart in Miami as early as 1919 under the leadership of Miami Mayor Ed Sewell. But it wasn't until 1939 that Florida Senator Claude Pepper and other delegates at the Florida State Chamber of Commerce passed a resolution proposing that a Pan-American trade mart be built in Miami.

In 1950, Washington approved a government-sponsored Inter-American Center in Miami, and on October 12 of that year, several Latin American republics signed preliminary participation in the project. In 1951, the Florida Legislature established the Inter-American Authority under the leadership of Dr. W. H. Walker. At the same time, the IAA selected a 1,600-acre (6.5 km^{2}) bay-front site, five miles (8 km) north of central Miami on a site originally intended to be an airport.

New York architect Hugh Ferriss was the main visual interpreter of the first master plans from 1950–1956. Ferriss had previously worked as the official renderer for the 1939 New York World's Fair.

== Development ==
The first plans for the permanent fair were published in a two-page spread in Sunday Miami Herald on June 21, 1950 (Ferris would later publish the very first rendering in his 1953 Power in Buildings). The first plan was the work of a group of architects directed by architect Robert Fitch Smith and including Russell Pancoast. As shown in the two renderings that Ferriss was paid to realize (about $1500), the project had a strong naval theme and seemed inspired by Frank Lloyd Wright's postwar civic projects.

== Layout and theme structures ==
The complex consisted of a quasi-circular arrangement of buildings around a one-mile (1.6 km) perimeter long lake and was organized in three areas—Science, Art, Industry—expressing the "culture of the American countries at this time in history." Arriving from the boulevard, counterclockwise, the visitor would encounter the United States and Latin American pavilions to reach the palm tree-lined "Allée of the Arts" heading to the Grand Plaza, the Hemisphere as theme center, the Spire and the Hanging Gardens. Passing the small bridge, one reached the science area with the aquarium, and other research and industry pavilions (on the other side of the outside basin were planned a marine amphitheater, a beach, the Water Gate and the Club Island). According to Ferriss' memorandum, the Spire and its two ascending- descending cars "like many historic shafts, [would serve] as a site-marker. This shaft, however, is conceived and designed as embodying a massive spiral movement; it is as though a number of forces, or of national aspirations, having sprung from the soil of the Americas have now united into one force which spirals, or aspires, upward and in unison." The 150-foot (46 m)-diameter Hemisphere was supposed to include a decorative map of the Americas and be the central gathering place. As Ferriss suggested, "The President of ........ will speak tonight at the Hemisphere; someone may say to his girl 'meet you at 8:30 at the Hemisphere (sic)."

Ferriss' colored drawings (archived at Columbia University and the Florida State Archives in Tallahassee) show that in 1954–55 the project was simplified in terms of overall planning, but kept its characteristic semi-circular structure of a lagoon surrounded by concentric layers of exhibition buildings, canals and parking.

== Architecture ==
Ferriss addressed the modernity of the Interama buildings and mentioned in Power in Buildings that the original character of the Center "would be surmised from recently constructed buildings in Florida." For the New York architect, these buildings differed "completely from the 'Spanish-American style'" popular in the 1920s, and by now constituted "an indigenous architecture" developed by the participating architects for the sub-tropical climate.

At the same time that the layout was being discussed, the architectural concept of the Hemisphere developed as a concrete multi-arched structure that partially covered and screened a multi-functional open-air plaza for meetings, events, and other performances (variants of the 1954–55 Interama scheme can also be seen in J.E. Peterson’s black and white "expressionist" renderings).

According to the Ferriss archives, a selected group of international architects also participated in the design process as consultants. Paul Rudolph (who would continue his involvement in the 1960s) was one of them, along with the landscape architect Dan Kiley. The group also involved two Latin American architects and, in fact, the only ones to be involved over the two decades of planning: Fernando Belaunde (1912–2002), who started his studies at the University of Miami in the early 1930s and served two terms as president of Peru; and, more importantly (as some drawings of his concept remain), Venezuelan architect Luis Malaussena (1900–62). . In his sketches for Interama, Malaussena employed the same Beaux-Arts principles that he used in his most renowned works in Caracas, the Sistema de la Nacionalidad (1945–55) and the Military Academy (1951). His vision for Miami also resembled previous World Fair designs in Paris, Chicago, or New York, with his characteristic mix of classicism and modernism (the Fantasy Land area, for instance, was also a feature of the New York World's Fair of 1939).

== Revision Two 1955–1960 ==
One year later (1955–56), Smith, Ferriss and their collaborators produced the most complete and compact vision for the Inter-American Center. Ferris's impressive aerial color rendering—along with many preparatory drawings— illustrate this third version of the Inter-American Center as an extraordinary riparian city, organized as a densely built and landscaped grid of islands, canals, plazas, streets, and shaded parking areas. There is no trace in these perspectives of the formerly radio-concentric scheme. Interama now appears like a highly geometric, almost abstract modern urban composition—almost a modern image of an Aztec-inspired center. The central island was dominated by a revised version of the Hemisphere as monumental three-arch concrete structure on the edge of the bay. Next to it were a series of platform plazas and gardens, including a suggestive grove containing hundreds of palm trees. Around the center, the network of canals and pedestrian esplanades led to a series of campuses with a variety of modern courtyard buildings and complexes. All buildings used screening, ventilation, and lighting devices that corresponded to the contemporary trend of tropical architecture as seen in the projects of Alfred Browning Parker, Rufus Nims, and others.

== Revision Three 1960–1968 ==
During the 1960s, while Interama officials and architects were pursuing visions of an ideal inter-American community modeled as a World's Fair of the Americas, Miami itself was increasingly becoming a hemispheric city. New passenger terminals were opening at Miami's International Airport to support the emerging jet fleets of Pan Am and other airlines, and expansion of Interstate 95 connected Miami with the Interstate Highway system. A large-scale expansion at the Port of Miami facilitated both cargo and cruise ship traffic.

In the early 1960s, Miami architect Robert E. Browne took over the direction of the Interama design team and a definitive site plan was quickly approved. The compact and "urban" character of the 1955–56 version gave way to a more organic assemblage of man-made and finger-like land masses or "islands", globally oriented toward the south to provide easy water and automobile access, and whose general configuration prefigured Epcot Center in Disney's Orlando, with each island functionally and thematically defined. The islands converged to surround an inlet of water at the center of which arose the 1,000-foot (300 m) Tower of Freedom, whose main access was through a spectacular underwater tunnel. In the design of 1962 (the many unsigned sketches suggest that the scheme might have developed from Hugh Ferriss sketches of 1956), the Tower of Freedom was in fact made of three towers, perhaps inspired by some Japanese Metabolist organic-like projects, and would have featured pod-like elevators that visitors could take up to an observation deck and restaurant.

Automobile access to the site was provided by Biscayne Boulevard, by Interstate 95 then under construction, and, more spectacularly, by the proposed Mid-Bay Causeway. The Mid-Bay Causeway was a unique, complex project that would have enabled motorists to "float" over the water landscape in the manner of the Overseas Highway to the Keys.

Between 1960 and 1962, Robert Browne's team produced dozens of sketches and drawings that provided glimpses of the various sections of Interama, from the Mediterranean-style entertainment area and the open-air theater at the edge of the bay to the science-fiction-like skyline and views of the Tower of Freedom. Particularly striking were many miniature sketches of the proposed system of aerial capsules connecting the fair to the mainland and the various islands to each other. The Authority soon moved to the hotel built at the new Miami International Airport where various models were built and filmed for television news. In September 1964, the first phase of construction began. The work included clearing, dredging, filling, and bulk-heading 680 acres (2.8 km^{2}) of the low-lying tract in the bay. The opening date was moved to July 4, 1968.

Construction went slowly. By the tentative 1968 opening date, very little had been started, and it was clear that Interama needed to be replanned. The IAA stopped construction in mid-1968, which up until then consisted of dredging and filling in a few of the small isles.

== Revision Four and conclusion of the Interama project ==
After construction was halted in 1968, the site of Interama was divided up between Florida International University and the county. By 1970, then-president Richard Nixon chose Miami as one of six sites to be considered to host US bicentennial celebrations in 1976. Interama was soon thereafter reborn as an all-American exhibition focusing on the United States' history and future.

Between 1970 and 1974, the IAA teamed up with the Third Century USA company to design the new Interama.

By 1974, only the Trade Center building had been completed, and this, in addition to other political reasons, caused new US President Gerald Ford to cancel all funds for any type of Bicentennial Exposition.

Eventually the City of North Miami received title to 350 acres (1.4 km^{2}) in 1970 and two years later signed a lease with Munisport Inc. to create a recreational facility. Munisport got permission to raise low-lying areas with clean fill and construction debris but soon was burying the land under municipal refuse instead and then got a permit to turn the site into a sanitary landfill. Instead, the land was filled with drums of toxic waste and infectious hospital waste.

== Site today ==
Today, part of the site of Interama is now home to Florida International University's Biscayne Campus, as well as Oleta River State Park. Munisport was cleaned up and is now the future home of SoLé Mia, a mixed-use development project. The Trade Center was incorporated into Florida International University. The state park can be accessed by driving east on NE 163rd Street and turning southeast on NE 34th avenue.
