= Michael Swerdlow =

American businessman

- Born: 1943 (age 82–83)
- Occupation: real estate developer
- Spouse: Sherie Huffman

Michael Swerdlow (born 1943) is a real estate developer responsible for many large-scale projects in South Florida.

== Time line ==
Swerdlow History
Year	Action
1977-1984	Specialized in bankruptcy liquidations selling over 30,000,000 square feet (2,800,000 m^{2}) of leases.
1985-1987	Now a developer, he built 2 million square feet (180,000 m^{2}) of retail and office space in Northern Virginia, Connecticut and Illinois.
1988	In Florida He led a group of investors to take over Hollywood, Inc., giving him control of 3,000 acres (12 km^{2}) of vacant land and two million square feet (180,000 m^{2}) of functioning properties, at the time valued at $400 million
2005	Begins construction of Biscayne Landing on former Superfund toxic dump Munisport Landfill. Project is intended to include 5,000 condominiums, a hotel, a town center, and a charter school.

== Personal life ==
He is married to Sherie (née Huffman) Swerdlow.

== Projects ==
- International Swimming Hall of Fame
- Two skyscraper beach condos on a public beach.
