= Munisport =

Landfill in Florida, United States

Munisport Landfill
- Superfund site
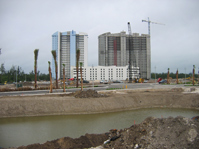

- Location within Florida
- Location: North Miami, Miami-Dade County, Florida; 25°54′30″N 80°09′15″W

Information
- CERCLIS ID: FLD084535442
- Contaminants: Base neutral acids, inorganic compounds, heavy metals, pesticides, VOCs, PAHs
- Responsible parties: City of North Miami

Progress
- Proposed: December 30, 1982
- Listed: September 8, 1983
- Construction completed: September 5, 1997
- Deleted: September 24, 1999

Munisport Landfill is a closed landfill located in North Miami, Florida adjacent to a low-income community, a regional campus of Florida International University, Oleta River State Park (a state recreational park), and estuarine Biscayne Bay. The 170-acre (0.69 km^{2}) Munisport landfill contains approximately 6.2 million cubic yards (4.7×10^{6} m^{3}) of municipal waste and was in operation for seven years.

Munisport was found to contain contaminants and a "small amount" of hospital biohazard waste was found on the site and drums of toxic chemicals during its operation. Audubon Society compiled a list of chemicals Munisport employees admitted had been buried in the dump. Environmental Protection Agency (EPA) officials never detected dangerous levels of those in the landfill and concentrated their efforts on the mangrove preserve south of the site, where the chief concern was the seepage of ammonia, created naturally as organic debris decomposes.

The 1992 Consent Decree between the City of North Miami and the United States redefined and shrank the National Priorities List boundaries of the site to a 30-acre (120,000 m^{2}) site is in wetlands to the east, away from the actual dump. In 2011, Munisport was designated by the EPA as a site ready for use and redevelopment. It is currently owned by the City of North Miami, Florida.

== History ==
History of Munisport Landfill
Year	Action
1970	City of North Miami purchased 350-acre (1.4 km^{2}) parcel of land on Biscayne Bay for $12 million in bonds.
1972	City of North Miami leased 291 acres (1.18 km^{2}) of this land to Munisport, Inc. for the development of a golf course
1974	Munisport, Inc began operating a landfill to fill in low-lying areas of the site. Materials dumped included hospital biohazard waste as well as drums of toxic chemicals.
1976	Dade County Department of Environmental Resources Management(DERM) finds twelve 55-gallon drums (labeled as containing tricresyl phosphate, ethyl cyanoacetate, and acetone) leaking onto the ground surface in the eastern portion of the dump. The drums were later removed by a contractor of the City of North Miami.
1977	County cites dump for leaking drums, medical waste, and odor.
1980	Munisport stopped landfill operations
1981	Florida Department of Environmental Regulation (DER) revoked Munisport, Inc. operating permit
1983	(EPA) added Munisport Landfill to the (NPL).
1985	EPA conducted a remedial investigation and found that leachate from this landfill (primarily ammonia) threatens the environmental health of Biscayne Bay
1989	Dade County Public Health Unit personnel discovered and removed a small pile of hospital waste, including human biopsies, from the landfill
1992	In the first step to delist Munisport without the expense of a cleanup, a Consent Decree between the property owner, the City of North Miami (principal responsible party [PRP]), and the United States redefined and shrank the National Priorities List boundaries of Muninsport to exclude the actual dump. Re-defined by the PRP, the new 30-acre (120,000 m^{2}) Superfund site is in wetlands to the east, away from the dump.
1993	In Federal cost-recovery litigation, the PRP proved that drums and significant quantities of hazardous substances are buried in the dump. Despite this, ATSDR-recommended soil testing is rejected, as this would interfere with proposals to build an amphitheater at the Munisport site.
1994	A Public Health Assessment concluded that the dump is of "Indeterminate Health Hazard." Completed exposure pathways include air, contaminated soil, contaminated surface water, and ingestion of fish and oysters from Biscayne Bay. Among contaminants of concern are arsenic, ammonia, benzene, barium, cadmium, carbon disulfide, chromium, chlordane, dieldrin, lead, manganese, PCBs, strontium, and styrene.
1996	The EPA conducted what many consider inadequate samples testing designed to minimize the toxicity results and pave the way for delisting the Munisport site to make way for future development for residential and/or recreational uses. Despite protests from those who had examined the Munisport site and the original scientific findings, including respected scientists, marine biologists, local citizens, and environmental groups, the EPA used these pretextual test results to remove Munisport from the Superfund list.
1999	EPA deletes Munisport site from National Priorities List. See:
2005	Boca Developers, a development group partnering with Michael Swerdlow, begins construction of "Biscayne Landing", a $1 billion, 5,000-unit condo project.
2007	First two condo towers open.

== Current status ==
It is currently a brownfield.

== Location ==
Munisport is about 2,000 feet (610 m) northwest of Biscayne Bay. Munisport is bordered on the north by Northeast 151st Street., on the south by N.E. 135th Street on the east by Florida International University, and on the west by Biscayne Blvd.

== Description ==
Munisport Landfill comprises some 291 acres (1.18 km^{2}), containing 6.2 million cubic yards (4.7×10^{6} m^{3}) of municipal, biohazardous, and industrial waste. It is a registered Superfund site.

There are 4 areas: a 170-acre (0.69 km^{2}) landfill, 15 acres (61,000 m^{2}) of uplands, 93 acres (380,000 m^{2}) of altered wetlands, and 13 acres (53,000 m^{2}) adjacent to Biscayne Bay that are separated from the rest of the site by the State of Florida mangrove preserve

== Environmental risks ==
The Munisport Landfill is located about 2,000 feet (610 m) from Biscayne Bay. Natural soils in the landfill area had been removed prior to dumping, increasing the risk of pollution seepage, especially into the Biscayne Aquifer, a primary source for drinking water in South Florida. The solid waste was disposed of without the use of a liner and with no leachate control mechanisms, so rainfall percolating through the solid waste has caused the release of elevated levels of ammonia and other contaminants into the underlying groundwater and discharges into adjacent surface water.

The remainder of the Munisport site beyond the landfill area, unfortunately, lies below the mean high water line, further increasing risk. Both inside and outside a dike constructed along the southeastern edge of the property are mangrove swamps. Biscayne Aquifer lies 150 feet (46 m) below the ground surface. The flow of regional groundwater is southeastward, towards Biscayne Bay, but varies locally due to mounding.

== Documented contamination ==
For seven years, nearby residents suffered as wastes were dumped into groundwater and piled up to 50 feet (15 m) high. After heavy rains, contaminated water flows from the dump, flooding and contaminating the area.

When the EPA originally released its evaluation and report on the Munisport superfund site, it stated that the land should never be developed and that an impermeable "cap" should be placed on the area so that toxic chemicals could not potentially leak into the air, water and soil, as the impact on human and aquatic health were unknown.

The original EPA evaluation of the site stated that the onsite samples originally tested contained di(2-ethylhexyl)phthalate, dieldrin, pentachlorophenol, and PCBs. Other samples contained lead, cadmium and ammonia. The ASTDR Public Health report stated:

Because the number of soil/fill samples is limited, we cannot determine the extent of contamination in the landfill portion of the site. Cover soil sampling on the landfill portion of the site (10 cover soil samples from 170 acres (0.69 km^{2}); 1 sample every 17 acres) is inadequate to fully characterize the extent of contamination. The fill material has not been sampled. Additional chemicals may be discovered and the concentrations of chemicals previously detected in the cover soil may be higher. To identify industrial facilities that could contribute to the contamination near the Munisport Landfill site, we searched the 1987, 1988, and 1989 EPA Toxic Chemical Release Inventory (TRI) database.

The report stated that the dumping of 2,600 pounds (1,200 kg) of styrene in 1989, and 12,000 pounds (5,400 kg) in 198, occurred by just one boatyard. Governmental regulatory agencies at that time indicated that the extent of contaminants on the entire property remained unknown. The report indicated that it was necessary to go down more than two feet (0.61 m) below ground (soil had only been tested superficially at 1-inch [25 mm] deep) to know what was really brewing beneath the surface. There is no evidence that this was ever done.

The Public Health Assessment concluded: "Inhalation of contaminated dust is a past and future air exposure pathway. Contaminated soils and fill material are sources of contaminated dust."

The Western portion of Munisport Dump was backfilled with solid waste consisting, among other things, of solid waste consisting of trash and municipal garbage. Among the non-permitted dumping discovered and documented were 12 drums containing tricresyl phosphate, ethylcyanoacetate, and acetate. "Small amounts" of hospital waste were found on the site.

The contamination in soil, sediments, surface water, and groundwater sampled and documented include:

- 4-DDE
- ammonia
- arsenic
- asbestos
- barium
- benzene
- beta-BHC
- Bis(2-ethylhexyl) phthalate
- cadmium
- carbon disulfide
- chlordane
- chlorobenzene
- chromium
- coliform bacteria
- dieldrin
- ethylbenzene
- leachate
- lead
- manganese
- mercury
- methylene chloride
- molybdenum
- nickel
- pentachlorophenol
- pesticides
- polychlorinated biphenyls (PCBs)
- strontium
- styrene
- vanadium
- VOCs
- zinc

== Resident exposure to contamination ==
In the early 1990s Highland Park residents expressed concerns that contaminated soil and water at Munisport has exposed adjacent Highland Village mobile home park, population est. 1,500, by stormwater run-off and contaminated airborne pollution (by dust). In addition, Highland Park residents expressed concerns that children have been directly exposed when trespassing on the site. There was a 1990 landfill fire that residents believe could have caused additional toxic exposure, although air sampling was not done in time.

=== Documented complaints from adjacent Highland Village ===
The following are documented complaints from Highland Village Residents after dumping began at Munisport Landfill:

- rashes, respiratory illnesses, and infections suffered in the 1970s and 1980s, caused by exposure to dust from landfill.
- toxic smoke from the March/April 1990 landfill fire aggravated existing respiratory conditions
- increased rates of eye irritation and infection from swimming at the Oleta State Recreation Area and in the lagoon adjacent to Florida International University.
- children developed serious skin infections after being cut or scratched.
- inordinately high number of cancers in their neighborhood after dumping began

== See also ==
- Landfill in the United States
- List of Superfund sites in Florida
