= Oleta River =

River in the United States of America

Coordinates: 25°56′N 80°08′W

The Oleta River, situated north of Miami, drains the northern Everglades into Biscayne Bay, allowing freshwater to reach the Atlantic Ocean. Today, it is the only natural river in Miami-Dade County that has not been dredged and channelized. Its seven miles (11 km) of shoreline are largely undeveloped, making the Oleta River Corridor a vestige of wilderness in a matrix of urbanization.

Between the Everglades and Biscayne Bay, over six miles (9.7 km) of trail have been developed for use by off-road vehicles: slightly more than a mile of expert singletrack, a half-mile of intermediate singletrack, almost three miles (4.8 km) of novice singletrack, and more than two miles (3.2 km) of paved pathway. They all connect in what is essentially an out-and-back, but various loops of different lengths and difficulties can be ridden off the main out-and-back.

The extinct Tequesta Indians canoed the waters of the Oleta River over 400 years ago and today, a Tequesta village and midden site is preserved nearby as a reminder of the river's past human history. This area now represents one of the last wilderness areas available to wildlife in northern Miami-Dade County.

== Gallery ==
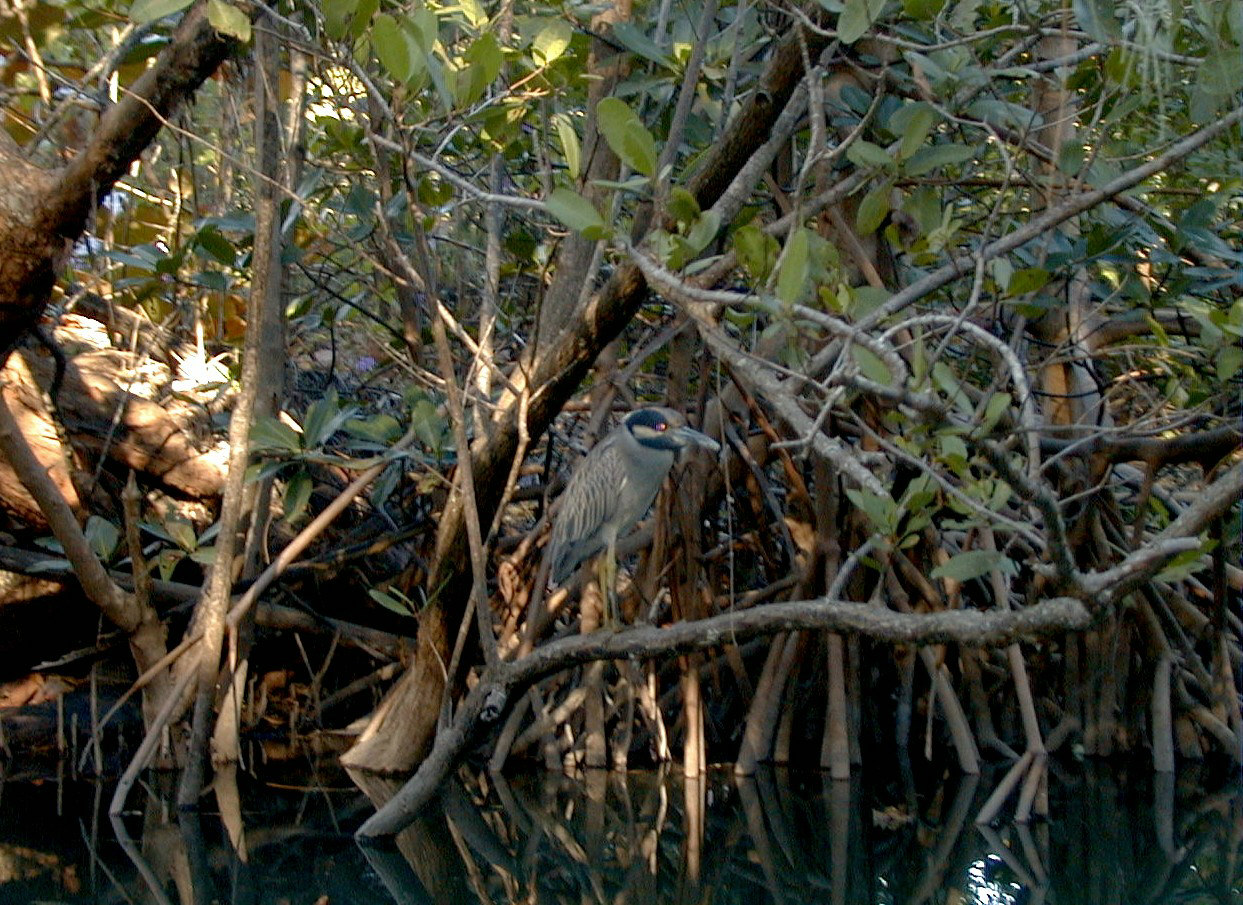
Night heron on the Oleta River

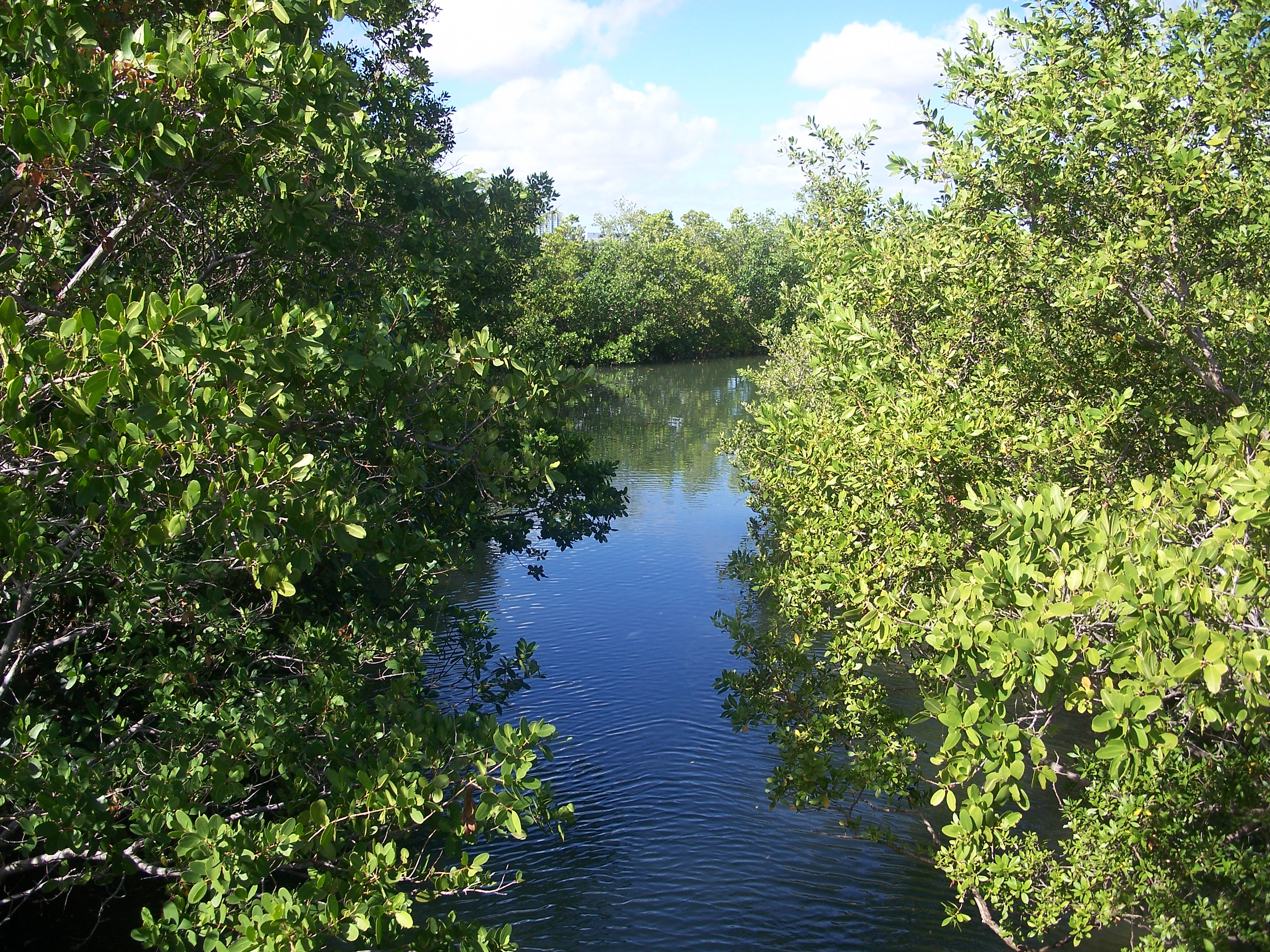
Oleta River

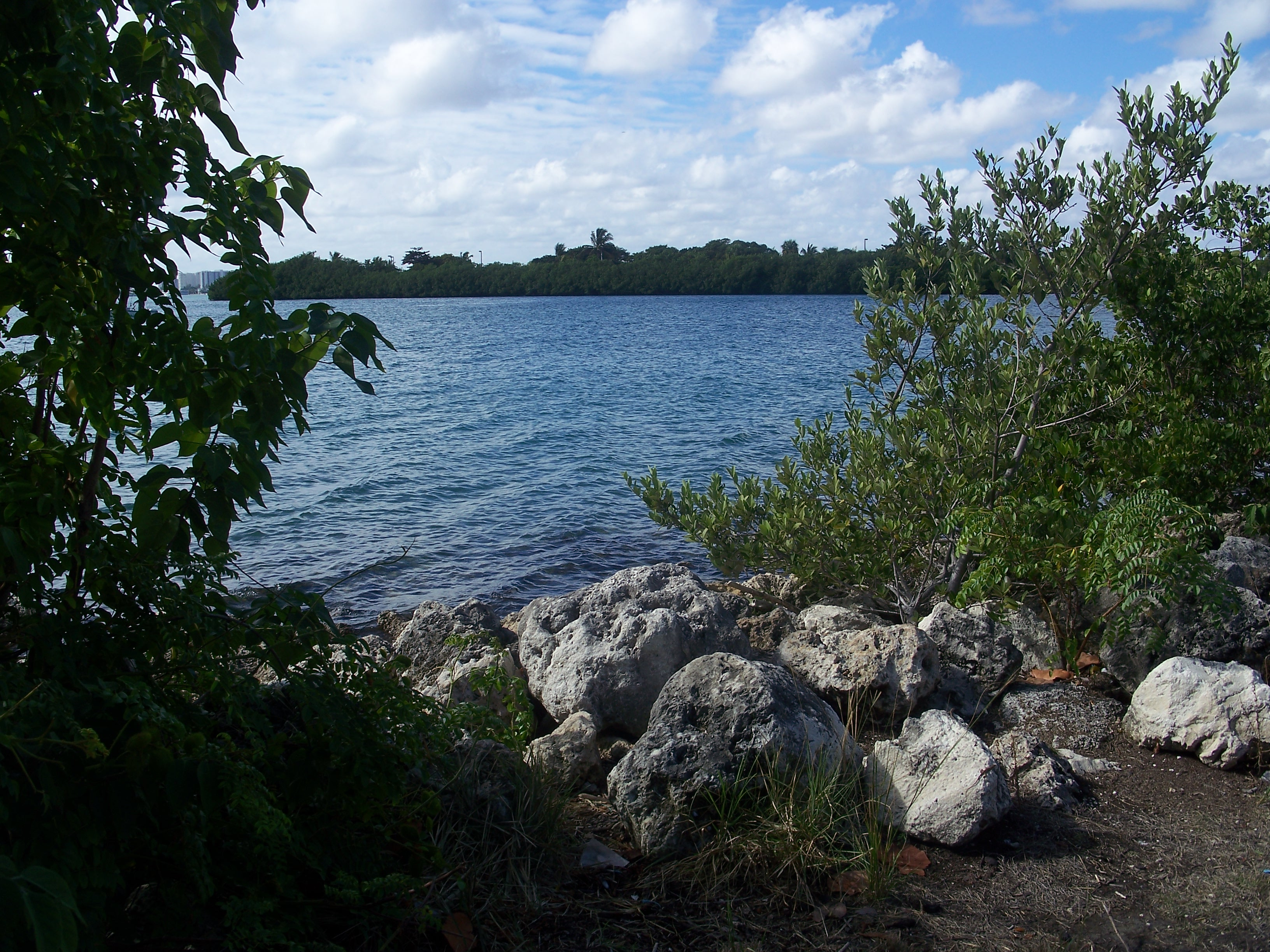
Oleta River

== See also ==
- Oleta River State Park
