= SoLé Mia =

Planned community in North Miami, Florida, USA

Coordinates: 25.909002°N 80.153139°W

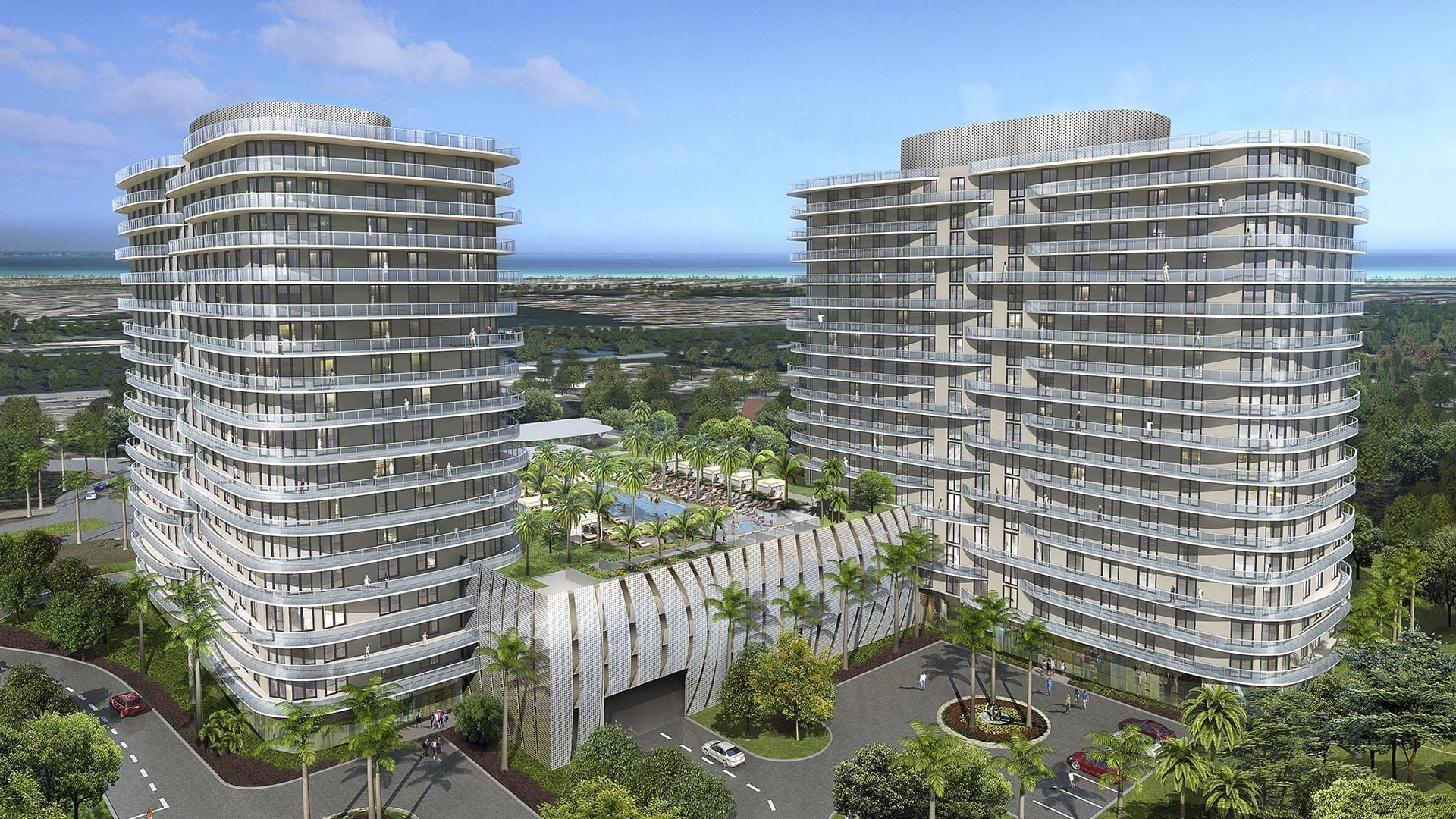
Rendering of the SoLé Mia condos in North Miami, Florida

SoLé Mia is a 184 acres (0.74 km^{2}) master-planned community located in North Miami, Florida, east of Biscayne Blvd, within an enclave on Biscayne Bay. The project was called a "mini-city" by The Miami Herald and has the first man-made lagoon in South Florida as well as plans for more than 4,000 residences, retail and office spaces, a medical facility, school, hotel and parks. It is being developed by Oleta Partners LLC, a joint venture between Aventura's Turnberry Associates and New York-based LeFrak.

The property is bordered to the east by Oleta River State Park, Florida's largest remaining coastal mangrove preserve and urban park, and next to Florida International University's Biscayne Bay Campus. Previous proposals for the site included an international exposition known as Interama that featured an amusement park in the 1960s, an indoor ski slope in the late 1990s in addition to several developments attempts in the 2000s.

== Overview ==
SoLé Mia has been the largest parcel of undeveloped land east of Biscayne Boulevard in Miami-Dade County. In 2012, the City of North Miami leased the property to Oleta Partners LLC, a joint venture between Aventura's Turnberry Associates and New York-based LeFrak, for 200 years. In 2015, Oleta Partners purchased more than 55 acres of the leased 184 acres site for $20 million from the city and began development. Oleta purchased another 20 acres of the original leasehold in 2019. The developers announced plans for more than 4,000 residences, retail and office spaces, a medical facility, school, hotel and parks.

In January 2019, Oleta Partners LLC completed work on The Shoreline, SoLe Mia's first 397-unit residential complex that was designed by Arquitectonica and Robert M. Swedroe Architects. Laguna Solé, an 11 acre park and man-made lagoon, the size of 21 Olympic-sized swimming pools, was also completed at that time, which marked the end of the first phase of the project. UHealth, the University of Miami health system, acquired a leasehold interest for about 10 acres to build a healthcare facility at SoLé Mia in February 2019. A Costco and Warren Henry, an automobile dealership with the largest electric vehicle charging facility in the United States, opened at SoLé Mia in 2019.

== Previous iterations ==
After working to turn the property into an amusement park, the land became a municipal landfill with some landfilling activities noted as far back as the 1940s. Landfilling activities ceased in 1981. It was designated a Superfund site by the U.S. Environmental Protection Agency in 1982 and was declared safe for development in 1990 after extensive environmental investigations and studies. Groundwater treatments and disposal systems were also installed.

In 2007, through a partnership with the City of North Miami, the previous developer, Boca Developers built a twin-tower residential community on the site, then known as Biscayne Landing, with 373 units. Wells Fargo Bank filed a foreclosure suit against the developer in August 2009. It was one of the largest write-offs in securitized mortgage history with a $196 million write-off of an initial $200 million investment. iStar Residential purchased 160 unsold units while the property was in foreclosure.
