= Oleta Kirk Abrams =

- Born: June 12, 1927; Bozeman, Montana, United States
- Died: January 8, 2005 (aged 77); Oakland, California, United States
- Occupation: Activist
- Spouses: Jim McClintock (m. 1947), 2 children Harry Anderson (m. 1956–1958) Mel Abrams (m. 1959), 2 children

Oleta Margaret "Lee" Abrams (née Kirk; June 12, 1927 – January 8, 2005) was one of the three founders of Bay Area Women Against Rape, the first rape crisis center in the U.S., and the first victim-witness advocate for the Alameda County district attorney's office.

She became involved after her 15-year-old daughter was raped at her high school. Abrams was appalled at the treatment her daughter received both from the school and the hospital to which she was taken. Rather than merely protest, she enlisted two friends to found the center.

== Early life ==
Oleta Margaret Kirk was born July 12, 1927, in Bozeman, Montana, to Howard Manning Kirk, who was a geologist, and Margaret Maxey. Due to her father’s job, she and her family traveled to many places around the world such as Turkey and Haiti.

== Education ==
She graduated from Emerson College (Boston, Massachusetts) with a drama degree. After college, she worked as an elementary school teacher. She then attended the master’s program at the University of Pittsburgh focusing on autistic children.

== Later life ==
In 1947, she married James Lewis McClintock in Newcastle, Pennsylvania. By that marriage, she had two children, Maxey and Rebecca Mary. Shortly after the birth of Rebecca Mary, the marriage ended. She then met Harry Anderson while studying at the University of Pittsburgh and married him in 1956. This marriage quickly ended. In 1959, she married her third husband Melvin Abrams and gave birth to Alexandra in 1960 and Simon Peter Kirk in 1964. She died in 2005 from medical complications during a lung biopsy.

== Work ==
Abrams started her crisis center because of the appalling way her foster daughter’s rape case was handled—the police didn’t let her call her guardians, had to wait to be sent to the doctors who didn’t even test her for pregnancy or diseases. In 1971, she established the Bay Area Women Against Rape (BAWAR), which provides counseling and education regarding sexual assault issues, with Julia Schewendinger, created the first 24-hour hot line to support rape victims and accompanied them in court when they testified against their attackers. Abrams was very dedicated to her work and eventually retired at the age of 70. She died in 2005, aged 77.
