= Oleta River State Park =

State park in Florida, United States

- IUCN category IV (habitat/species management area)
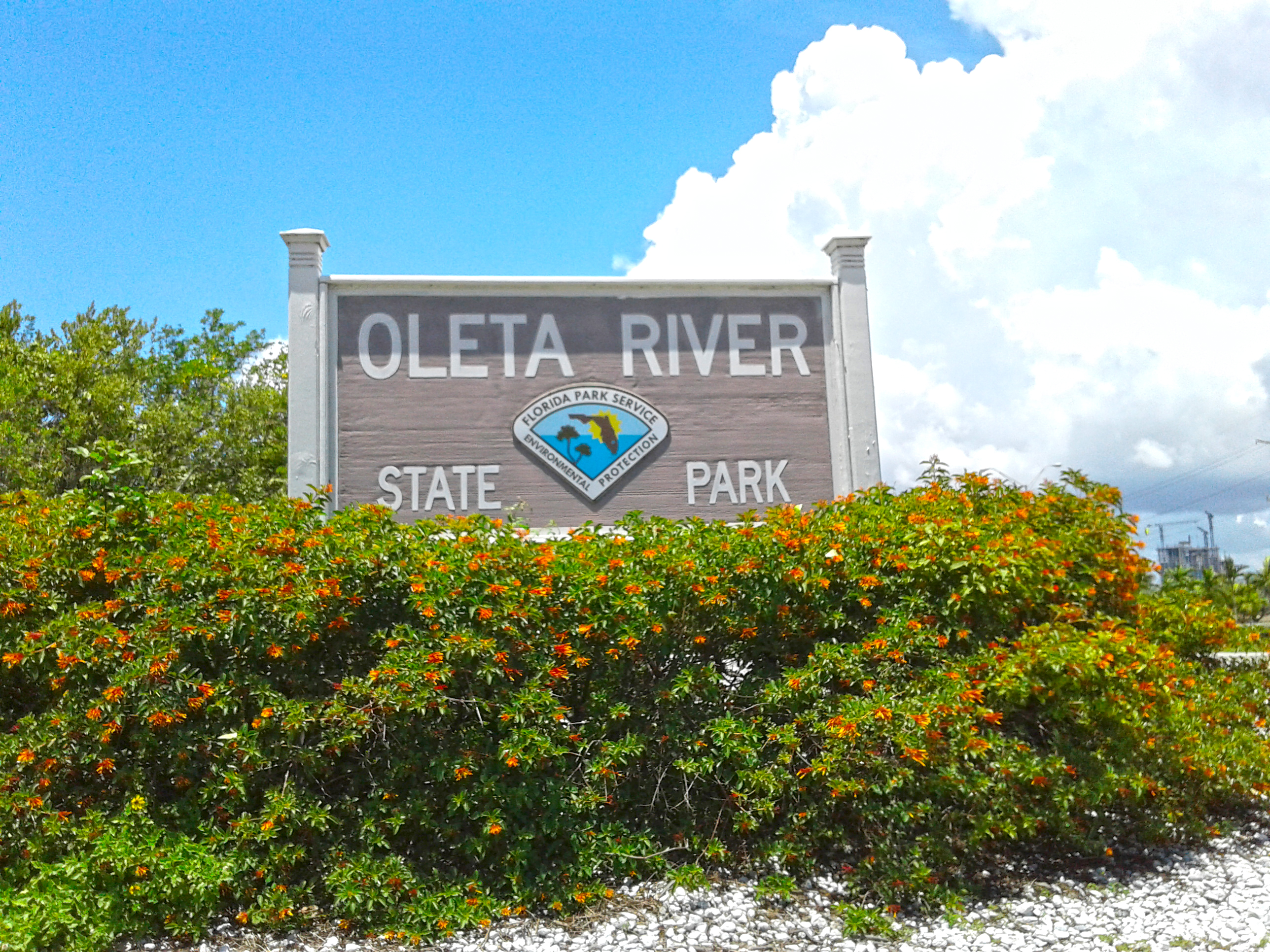
- Entrance sign to Oleta River State Park

- Location within Florida Location within the United States
- Interactive map of Oleta River State Park
- Location: North Miami Beach, Miami, Florida, United States
- Coordinates: 25°55′08″N 80°08′24″W
- Area: 1,043 acres (4.22 km^{2})
- Created: 1986
- Governing body: Florida State Parks
- Operator: Florida Department of Environmental Protection
- Website: Oleta River State Park

The Oleta River State Park is a 1,033-acre (418 ha) state park on Biscayne Bay in the municipal suburb of North Miami Beach in metropolitan Miami, Florida. Adjoining the Biscayne Bay Campus of Florida International University, the park contains one of the largest concentrations of Casuarina trees (Australian 'pine'), an invasive species in the state park system. Along the park's coastline are mangrove forests. They provide vital nurseries for aquatic life and filter urban pollutants from coastal waters. The state park promotes biodiversity of flora and fauna through the assistance of Friends of Oleta River State Park, a 501(c)(3) nonprofit citizen support organization (CSO that sponsors events, raises funds, and advances the goals of Oleta River State Park. The state park hosts about 15 endangered species.

The weather in the area has the lowest average temperature in January, being at 58 degrees Fahrenheit. The highest average temperature is in July and August, being at 90 degrees Fahrenheit. The lowest average rainfall is in January, with about 1.95 inches (50 mm) of rainfall. The highest average rainfall is in September, with about 9.21 inches of rainfall.

== Facilities ==
The central feature of this park is the mouth of the Oleta River, for which it is named. The river has drawn human inhabitants to the area since about 500 B.C, when its shores served as a campground for Tequesta Indians. It was used by U.S. troops (who called it Big Snake Creek) in 1841 during the Second Seminole War, and further explored in 1881 by Naval Captain William Hawkins Fulford, whose ventured inland to what is now the city of North Miami Beach. The area became more heavily settled in the 1890s and in 1922, developers changed the name from Big Snake Creek to the Oleta River.

The river itself no longer flows to the Everglades, but remains a popular area for canoeing. The park also boasts some of the best wilderness bike trails in the country and is a frequent host for triathlons and other extreme sports events. There is a beach on Biscayne Bay, kayak rentals, and primitive cabins. A Florida State Parks Annual Pass allows unlimited entrance into any of the state parks. Oleta River State Park is also the headquarters to one of the state's five AmeriCorps Florida State Parks chapters. The state park welcomes approximately 25 million visitors annually.

== Health concerns ==
Oleta River State Park is adjacent to Munisport landfill, a former superfund site. However, no health issues at Oleta River State Park have been linked to the landfill. There are four water treatment plants nearby the state park. The nearest wastewater treatment plant is the North District Wastewater Treatment Plant, which handles their wastewater and others nearby.

== Gallery ==
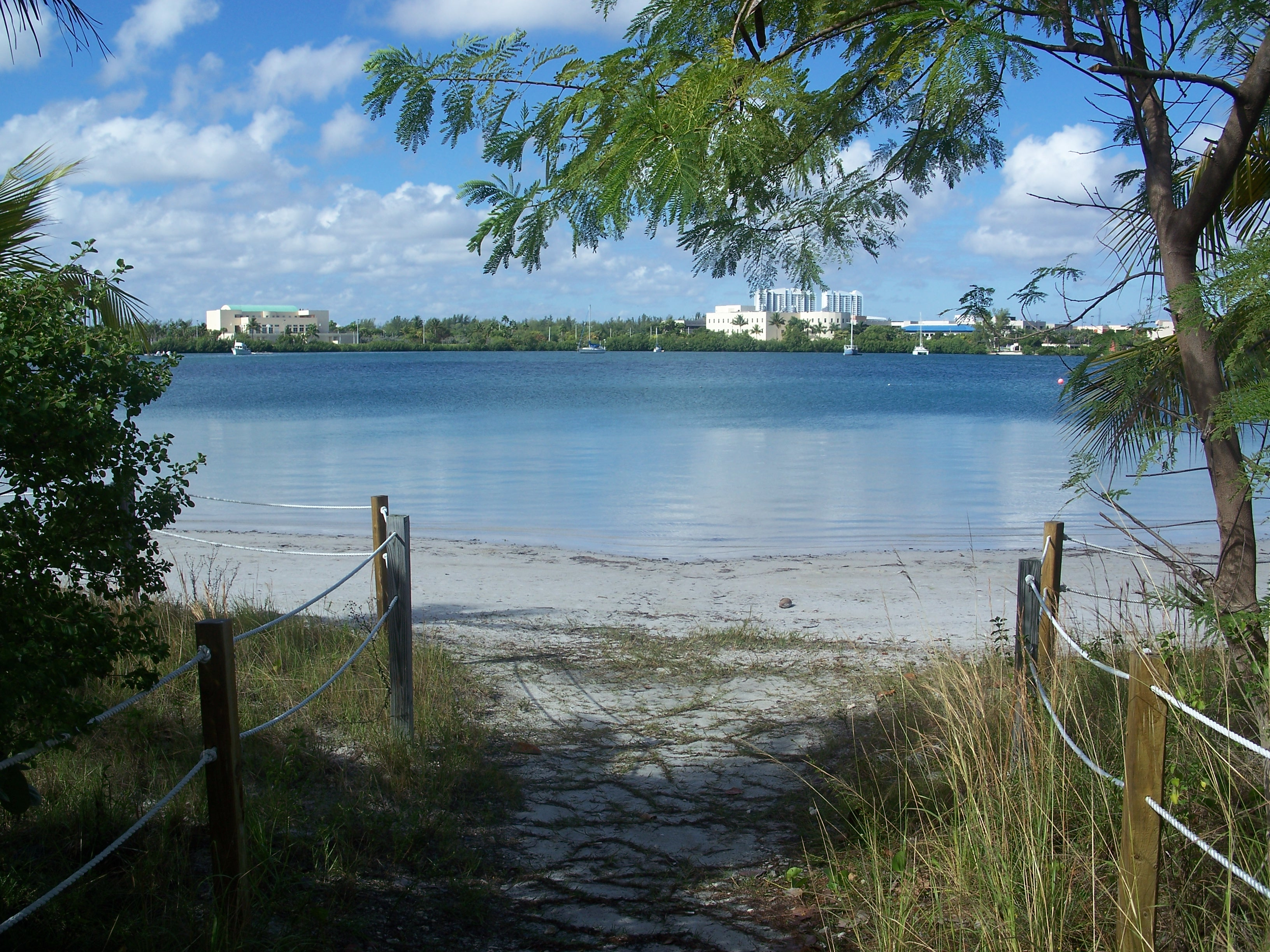
Path to beach

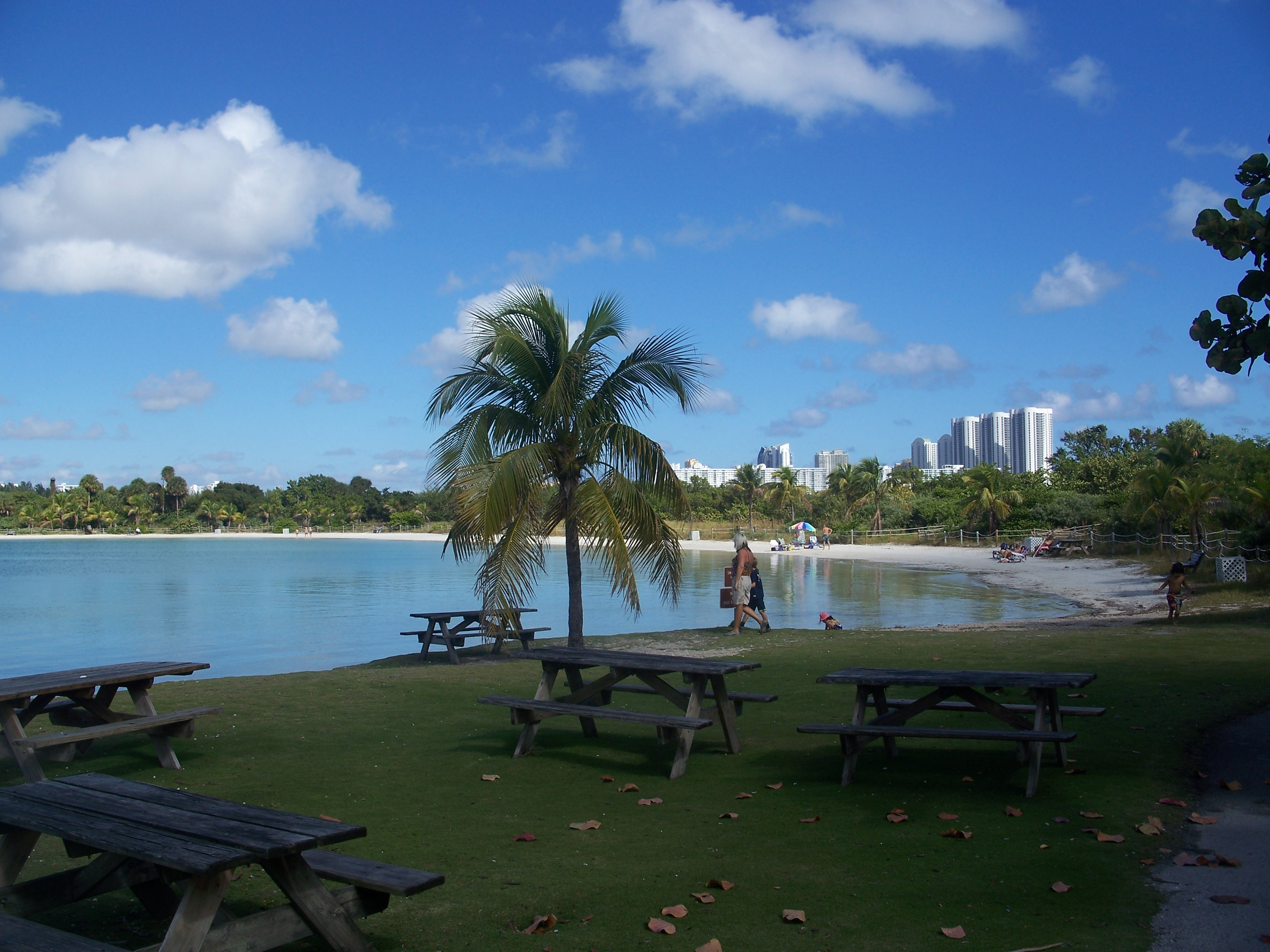
Picnic area by beach

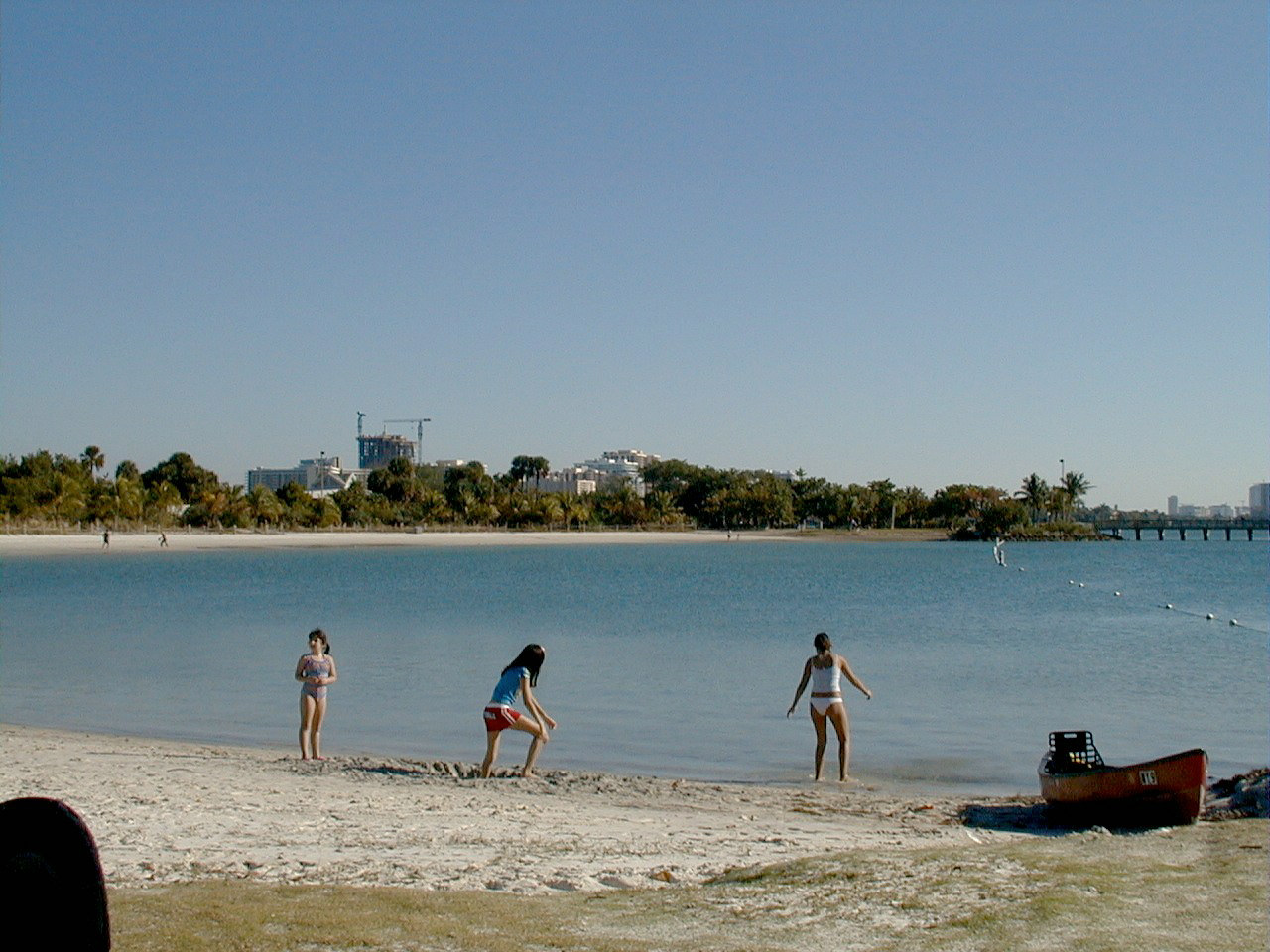
View of the beach

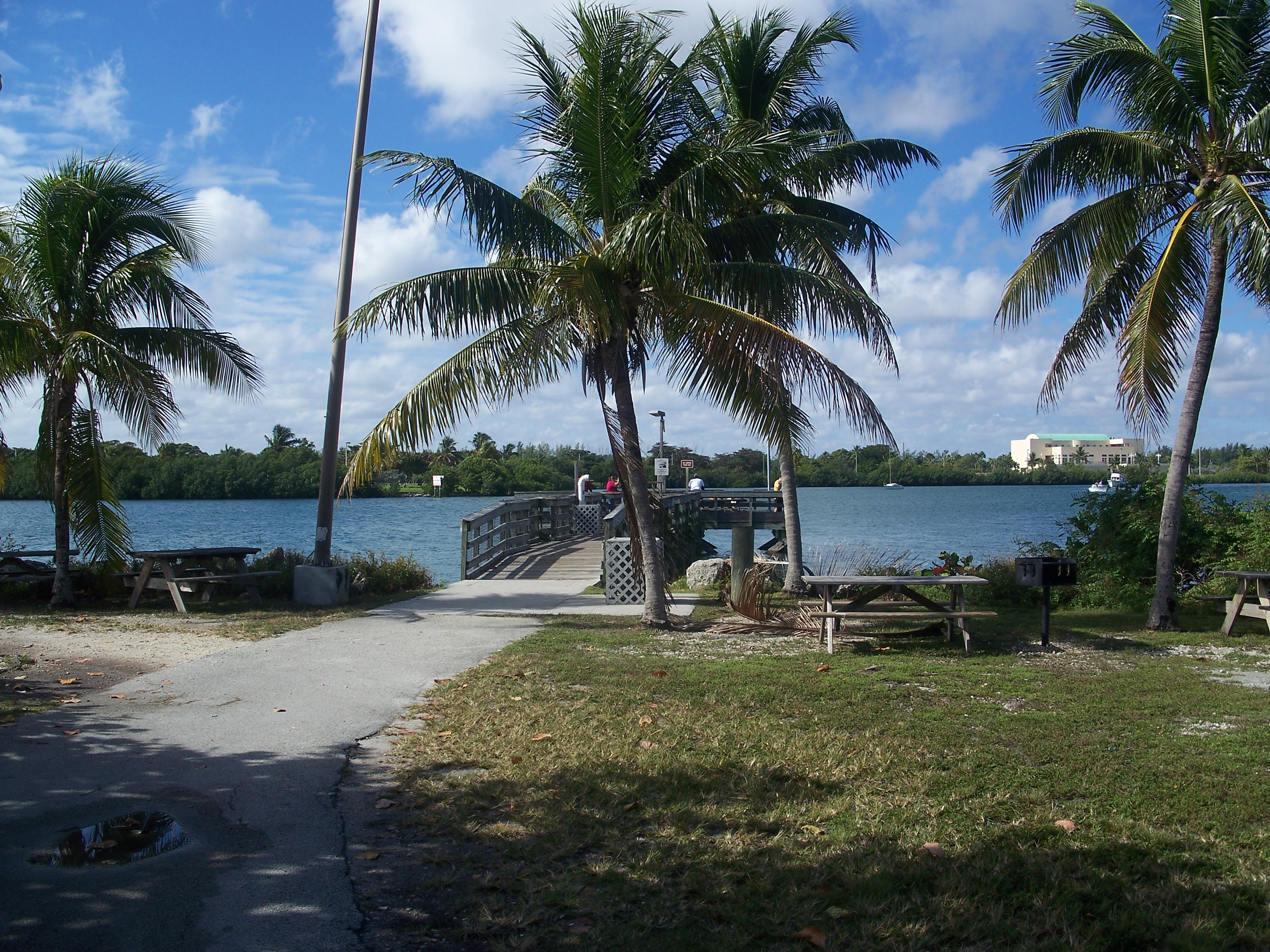
Picnic area and pier

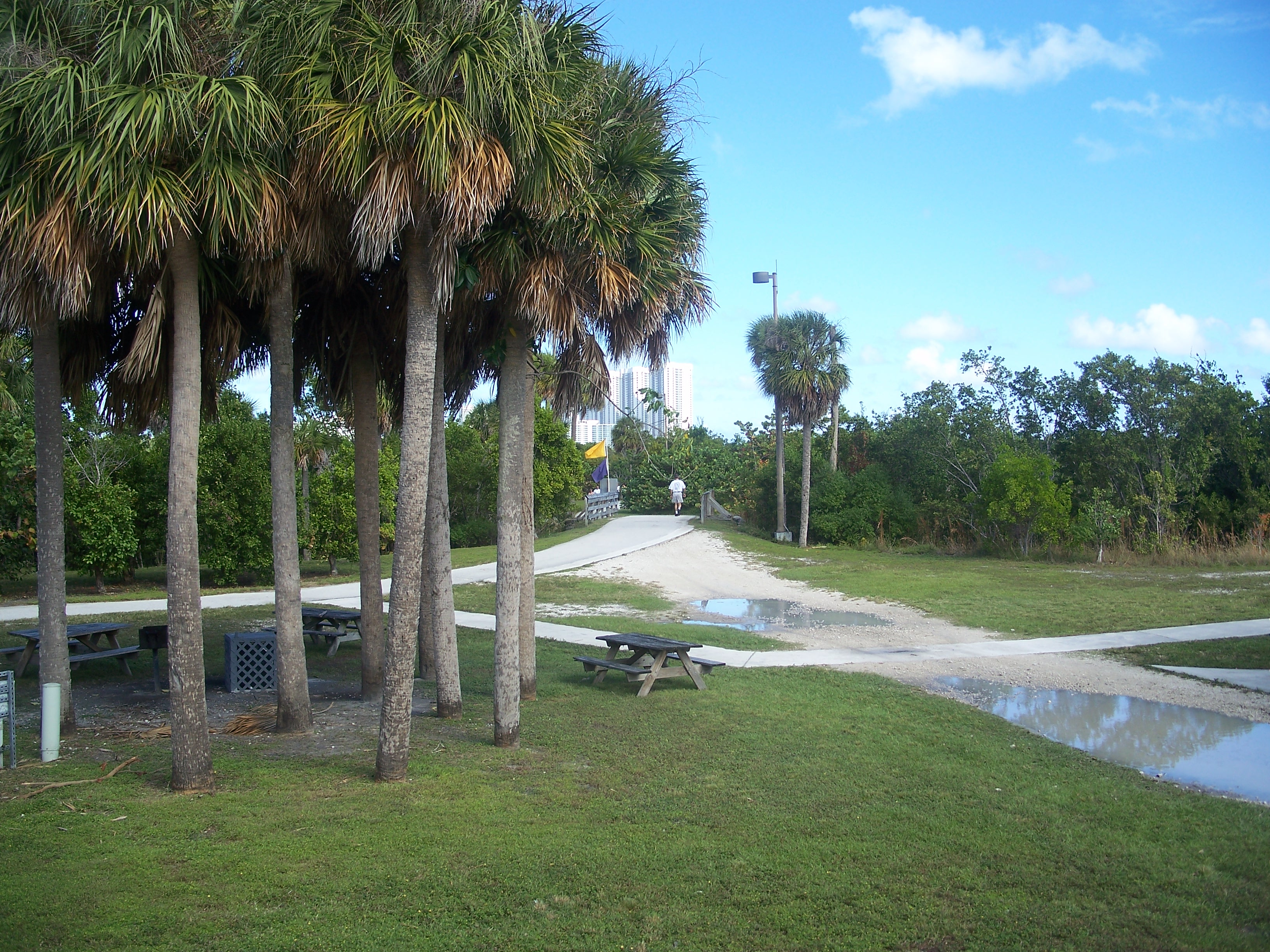
Picnic area and paths

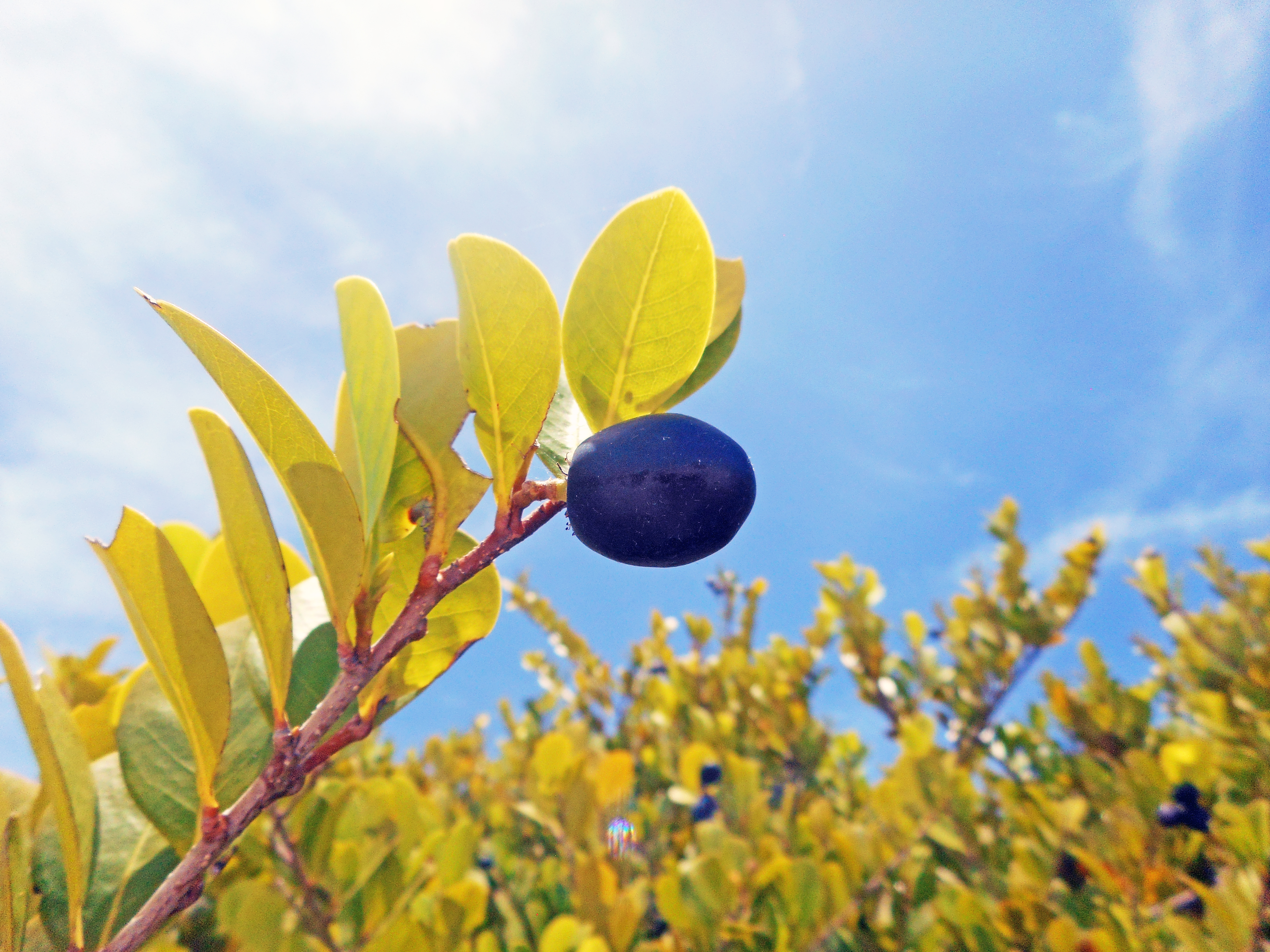
Cocoplum growing in Oleta River State Park

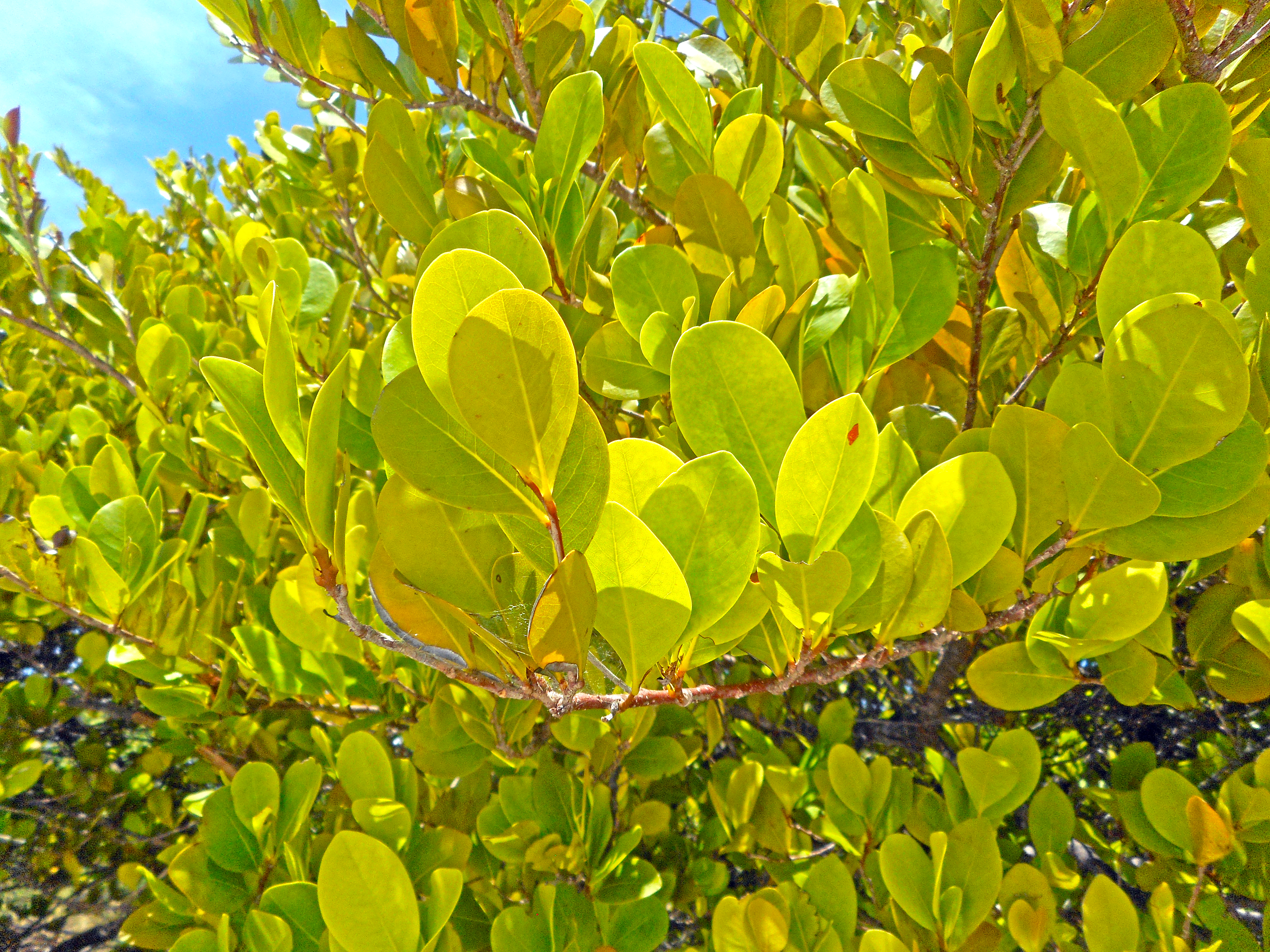
Detail of branches

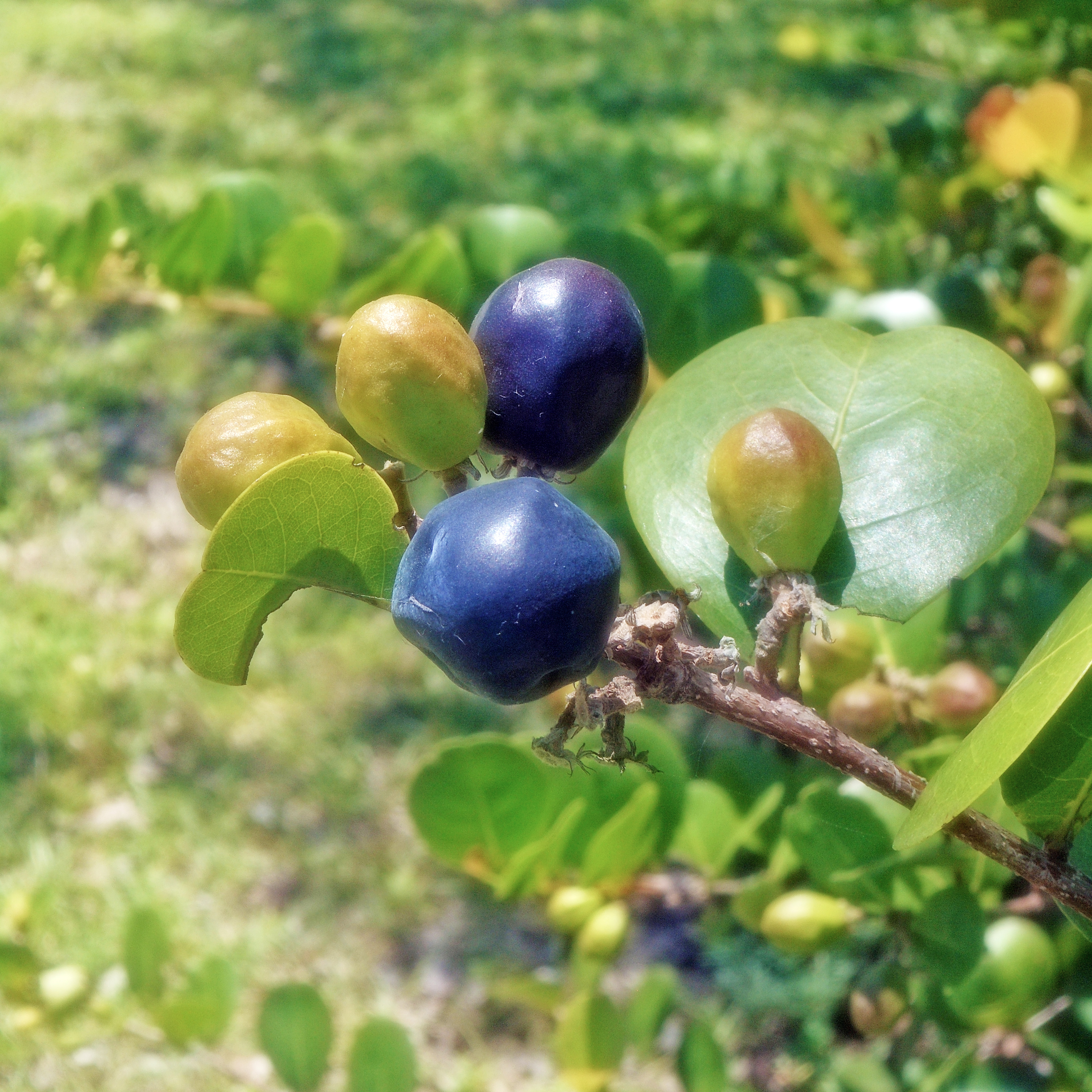
Mature and immature fruits

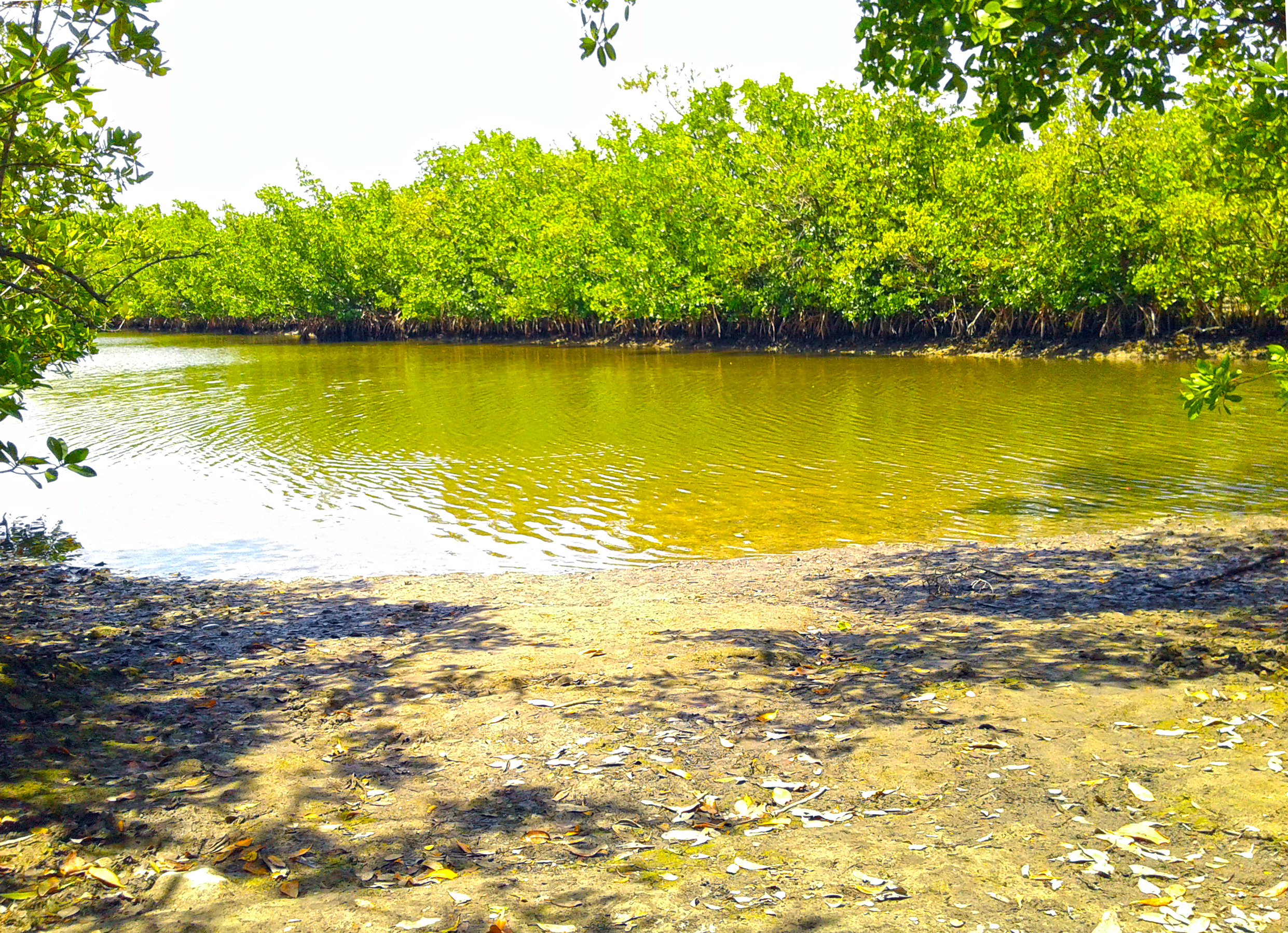
Marsh and mangroves

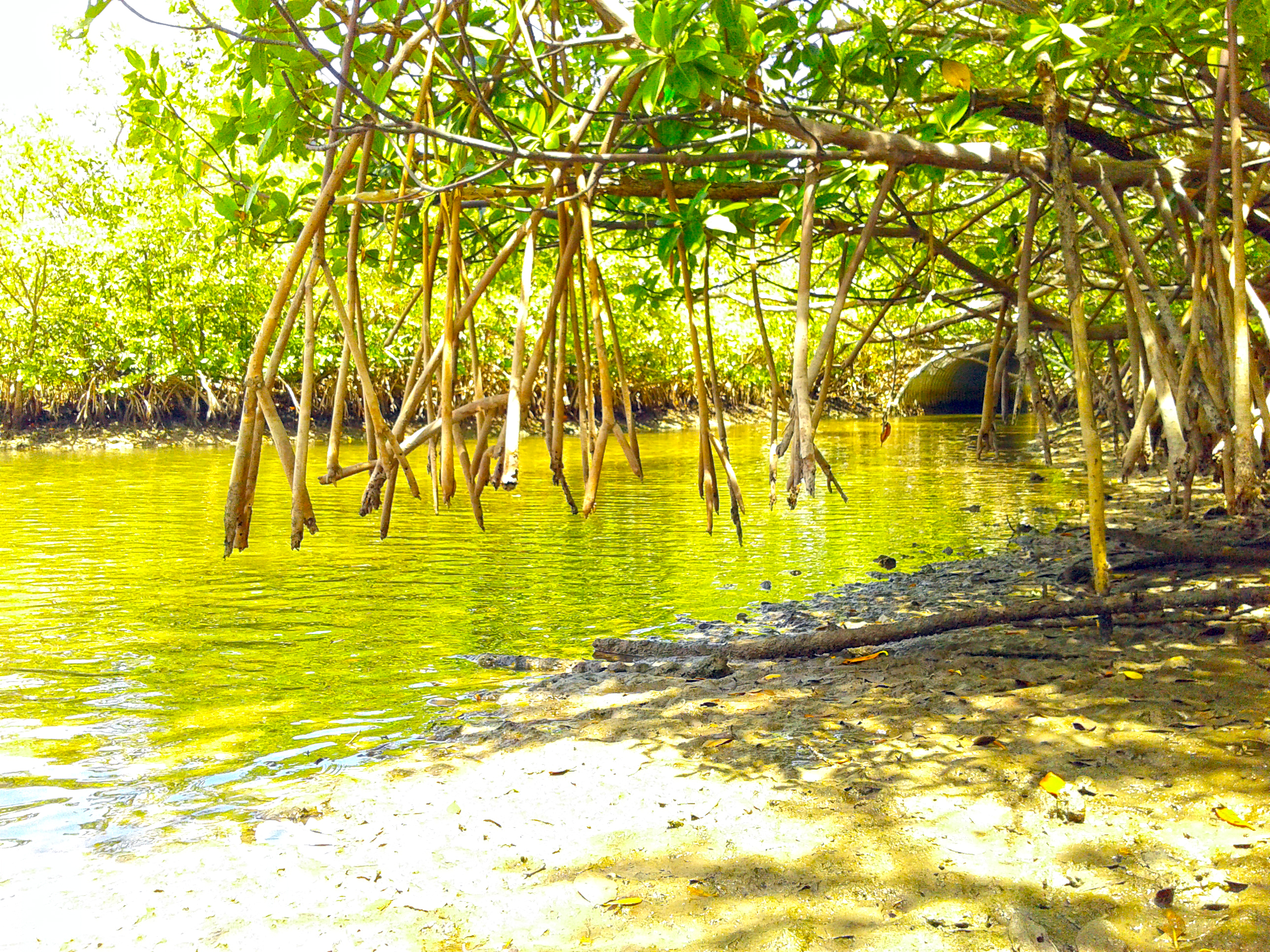
Close-up of red mangroves

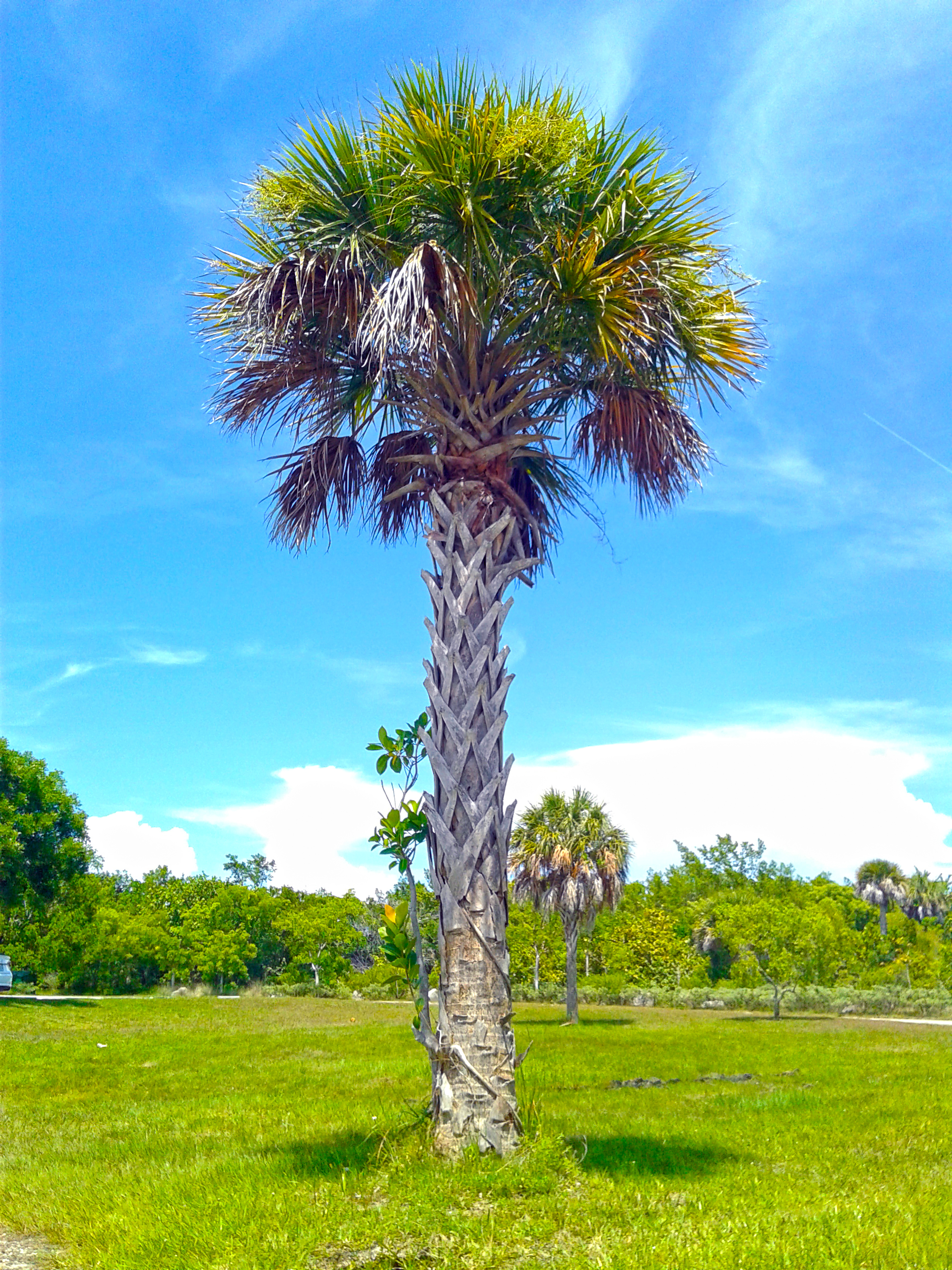
Sabal palm growing in the park

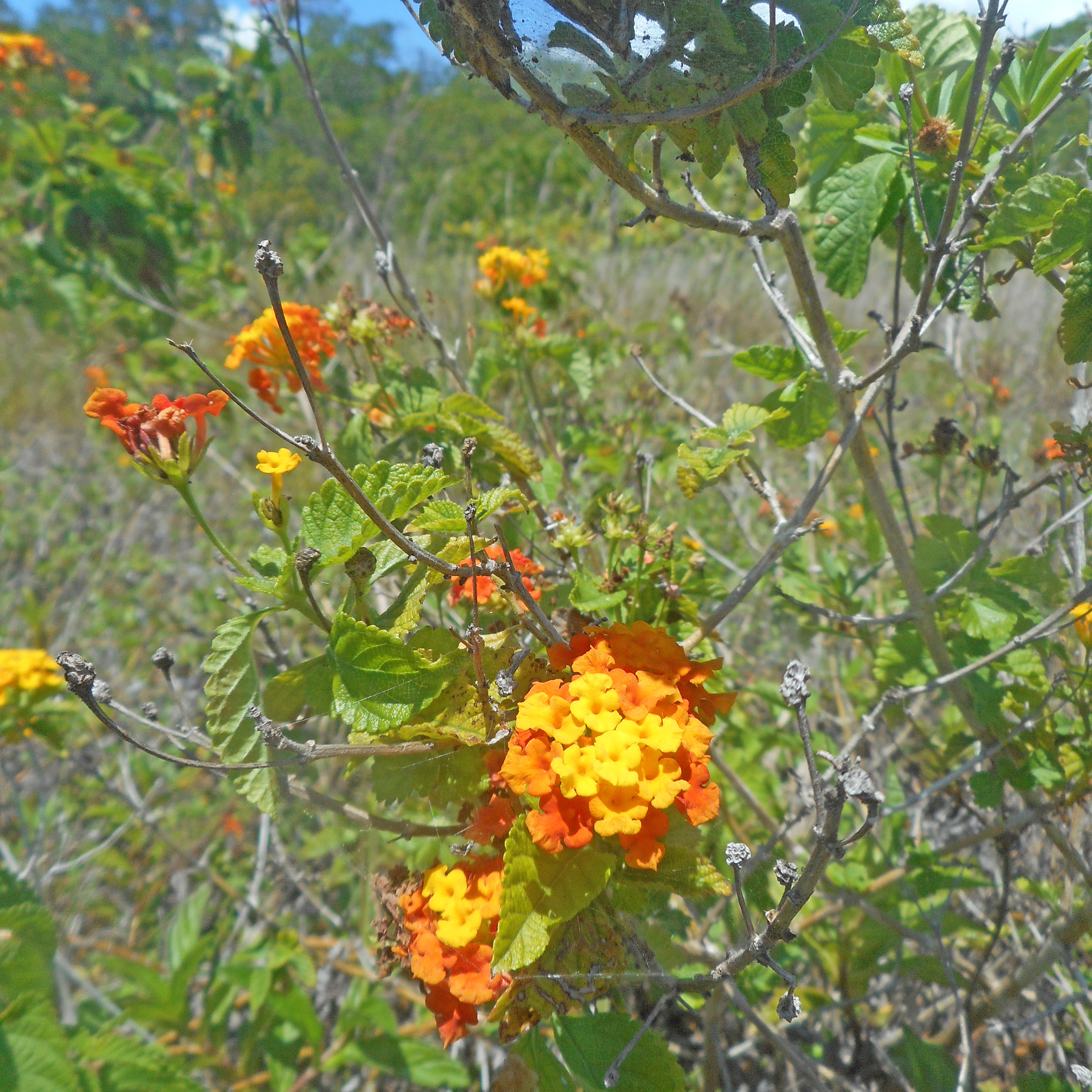
Wild Lantana flowers growing

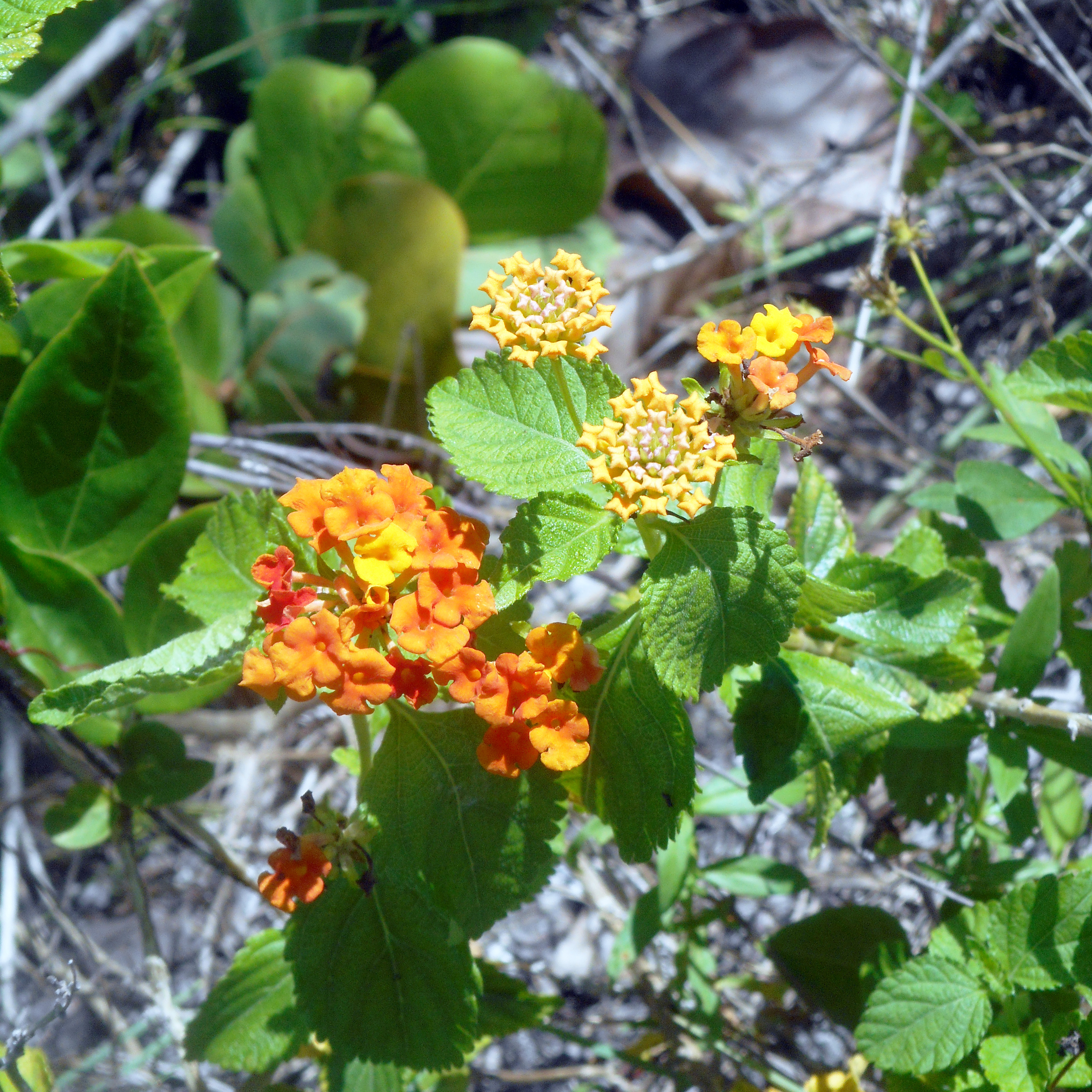
Lantana growing near road leading to entrance to park

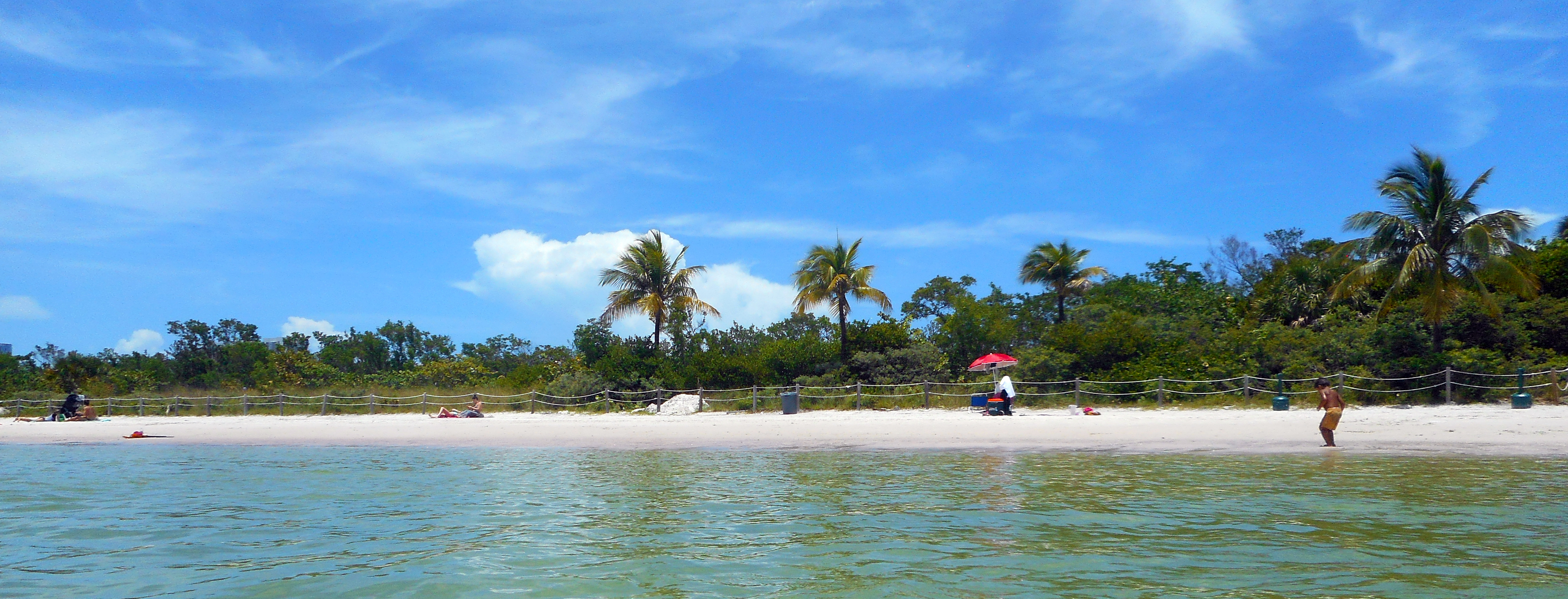
General view of beach

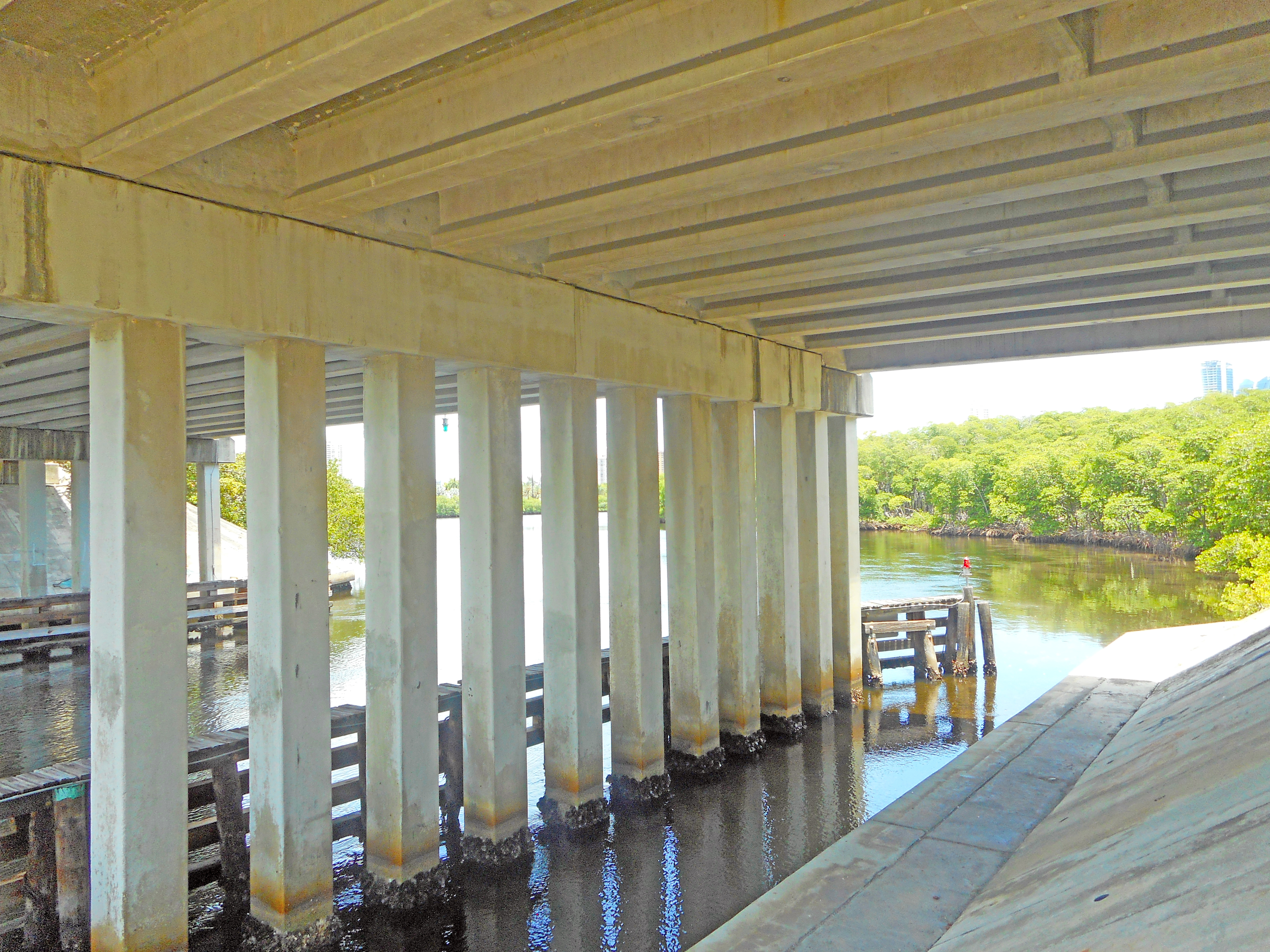
Underside of bridge leading to the park

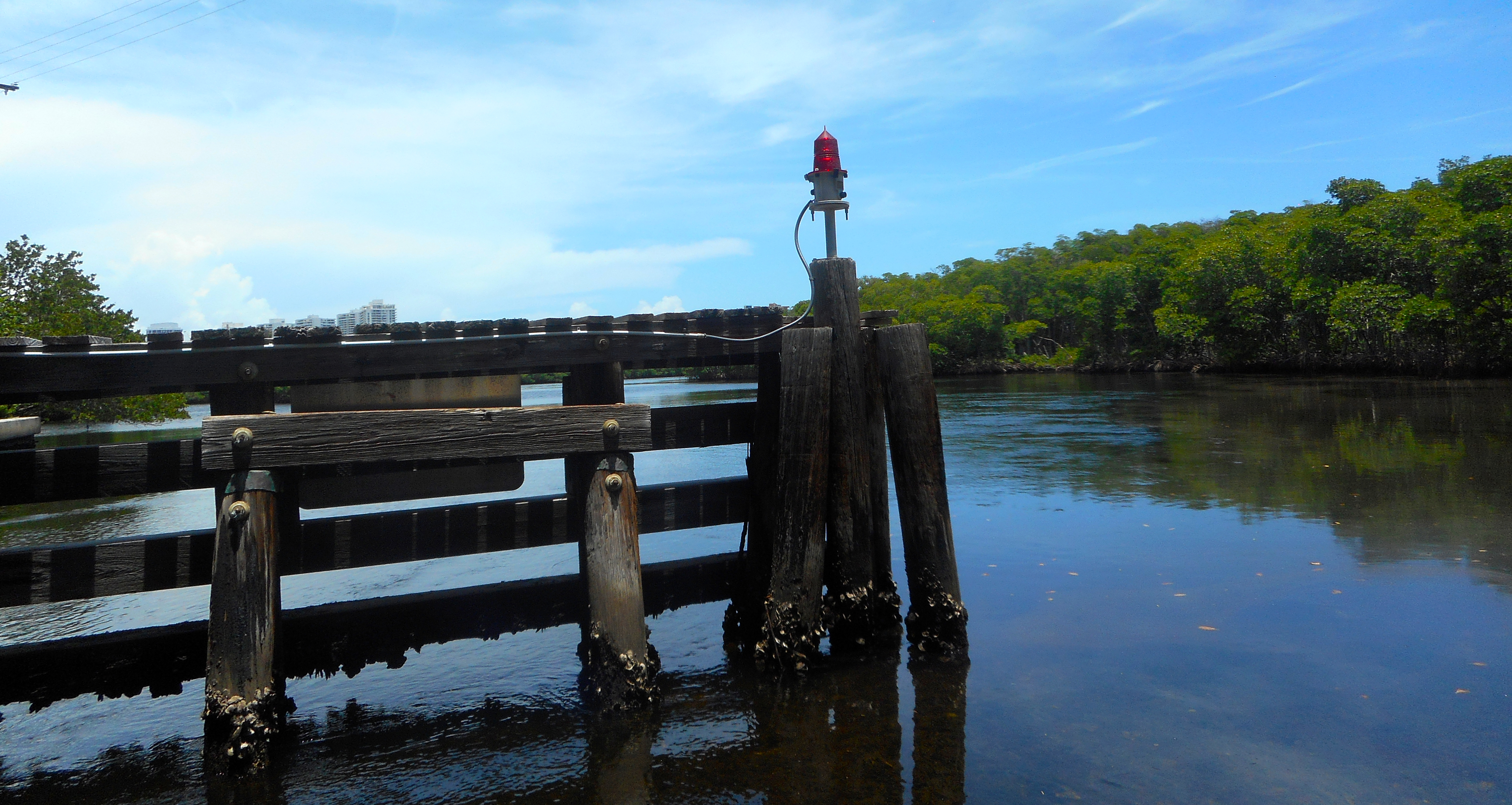
View of barrier underneath bridge to protect pylons

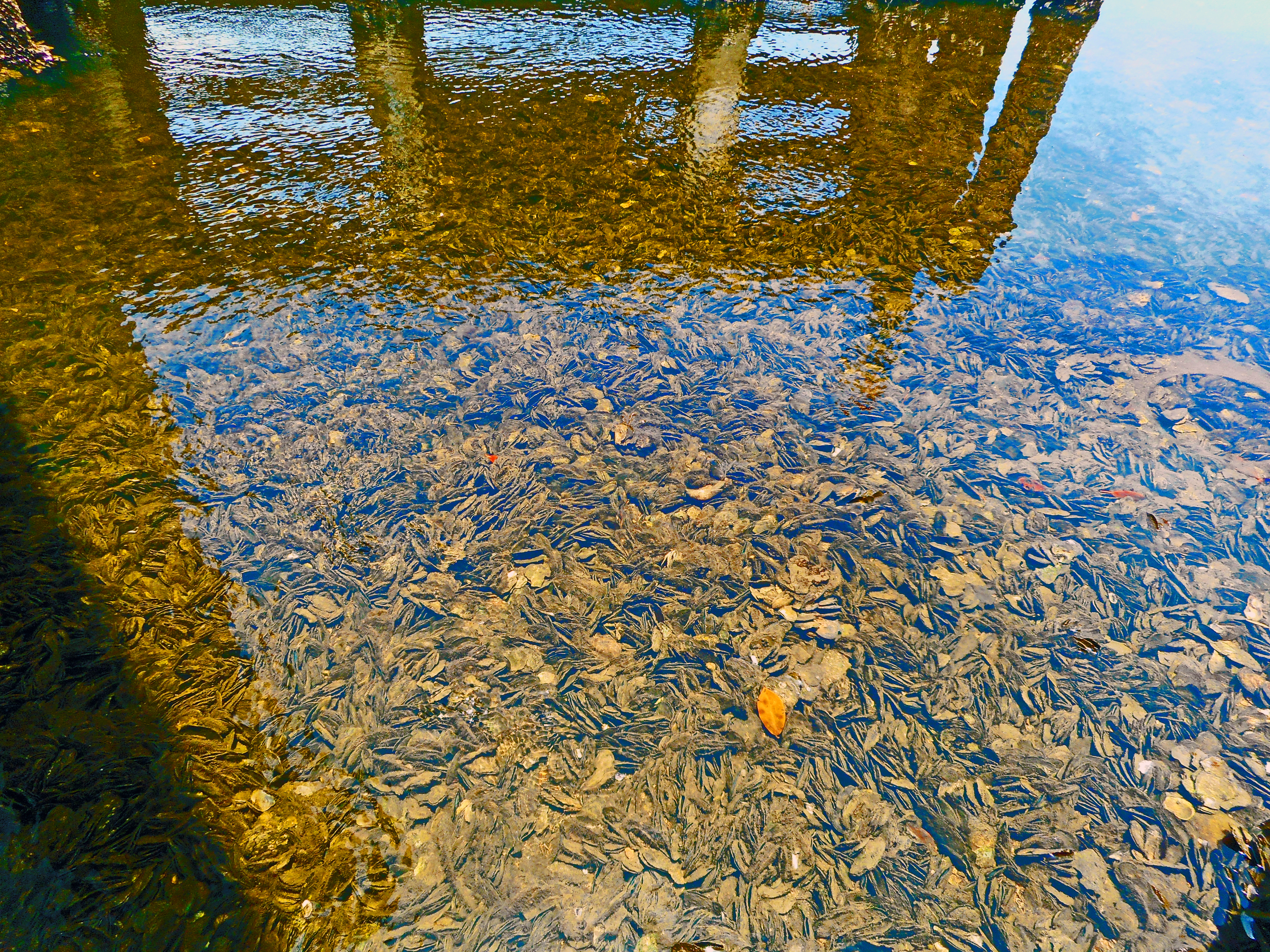
View of water with sediments and oyster beds underneath Oleta River bridge

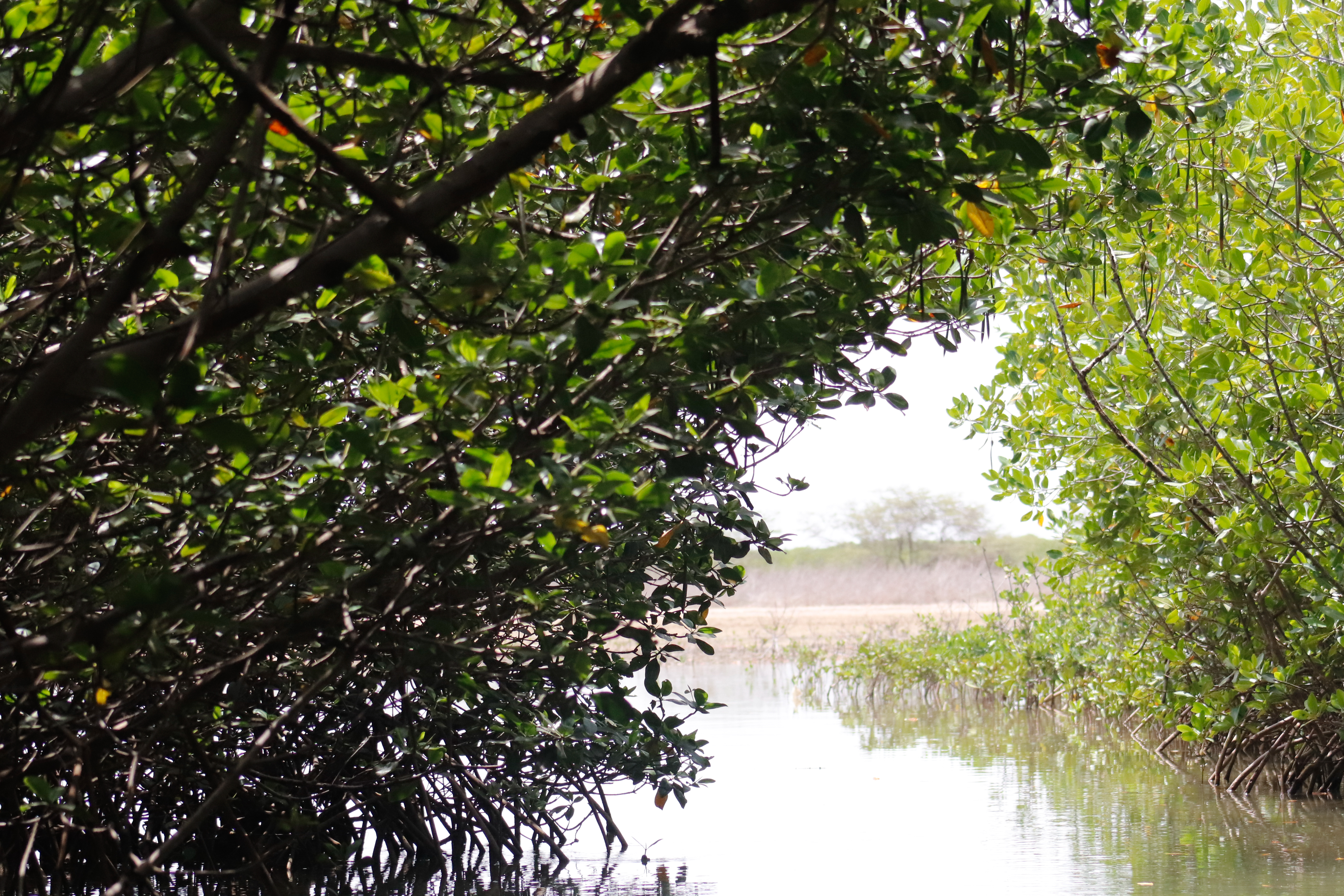
Mangrove forest

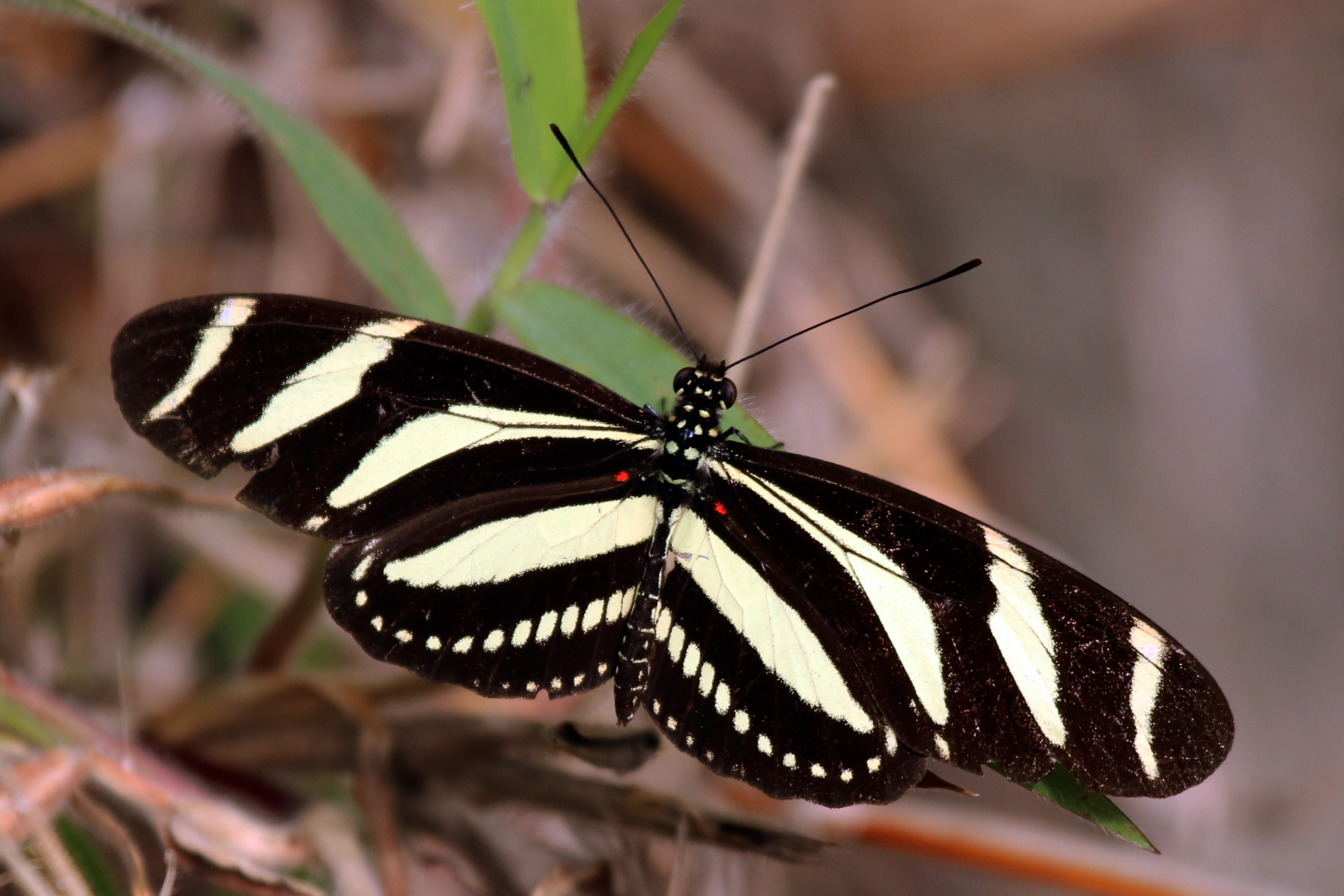
Zebra longwing

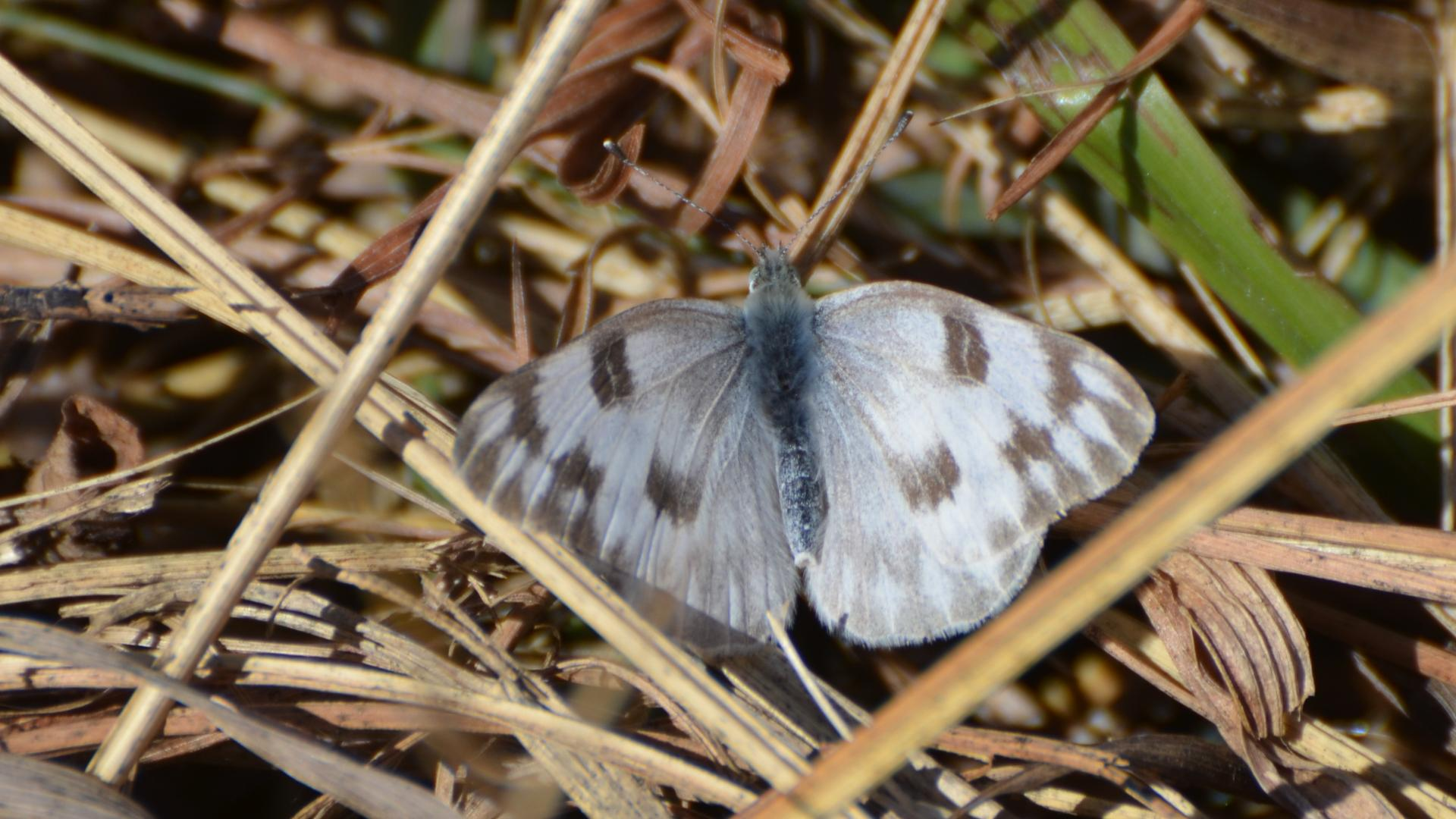
White checkered butterfly

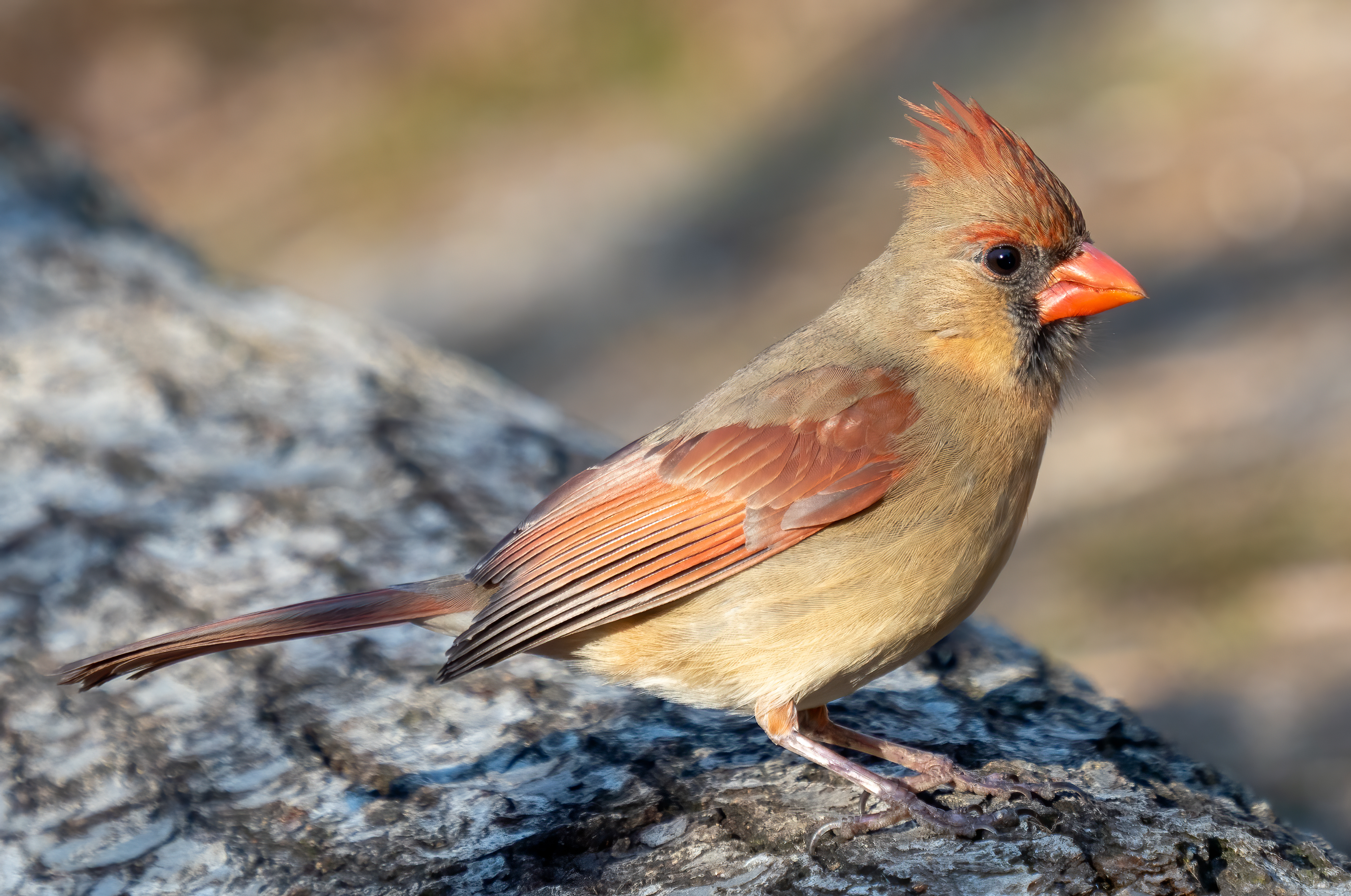
Female northern cardinal

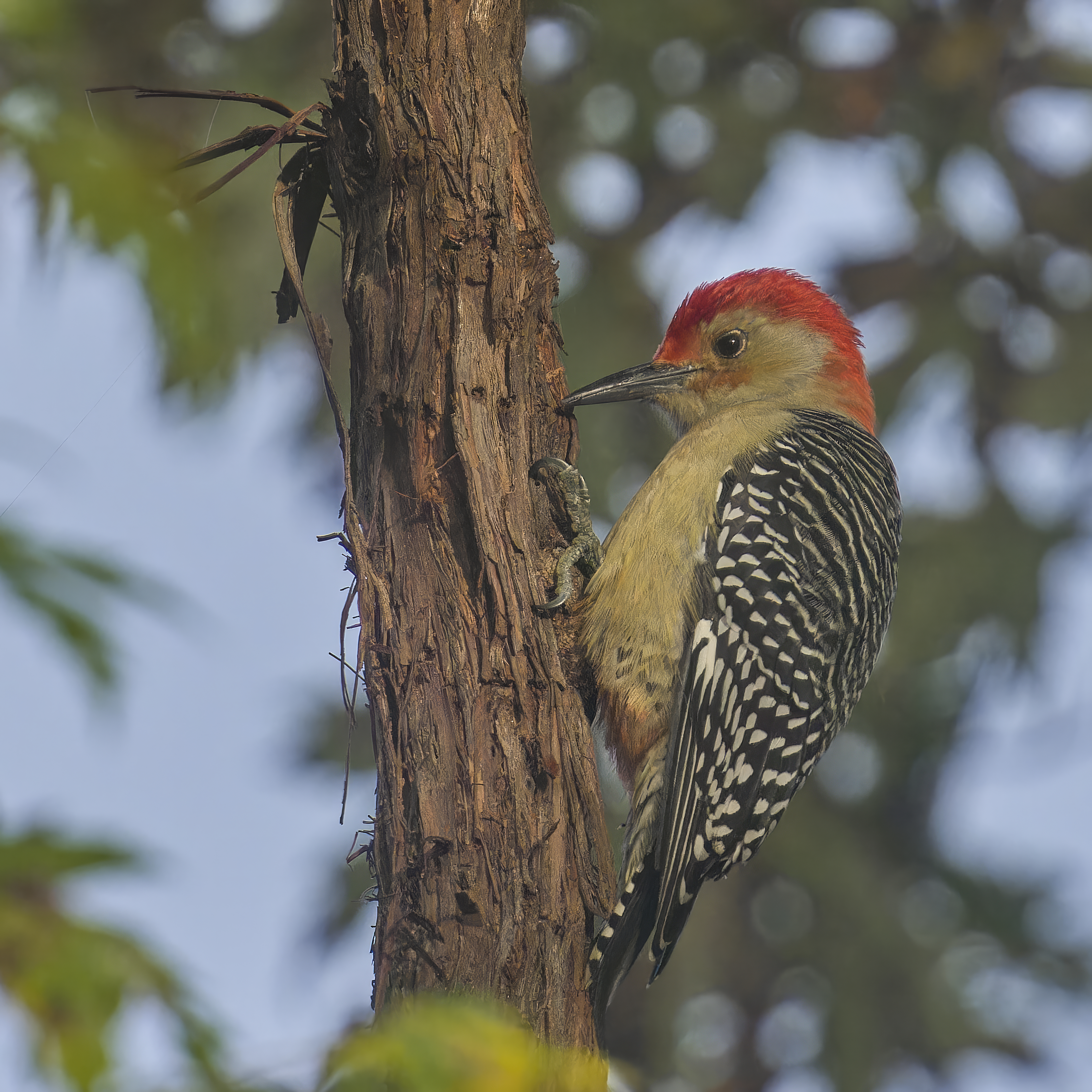
Red-bellied woodpecker

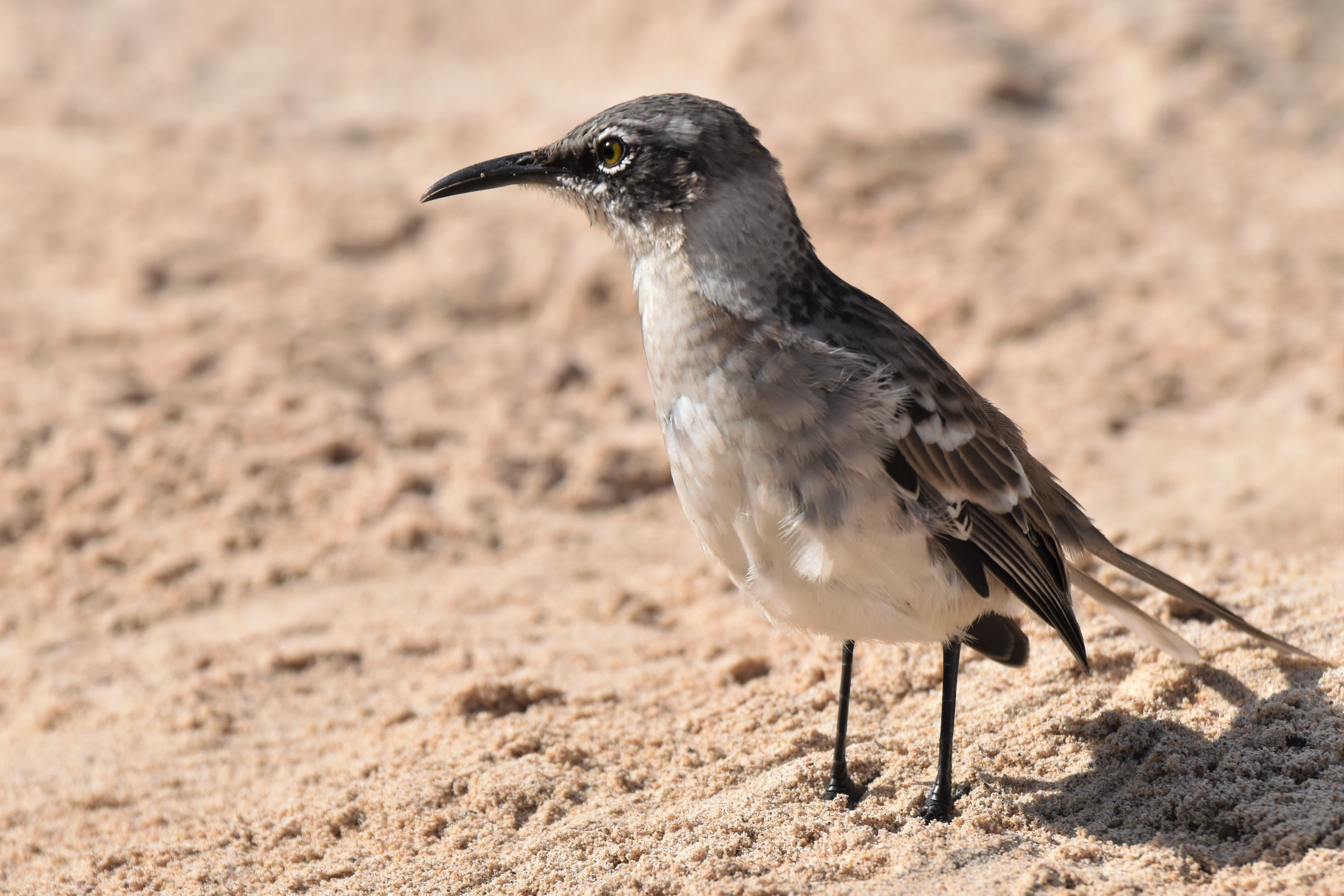
Northern mockingbird

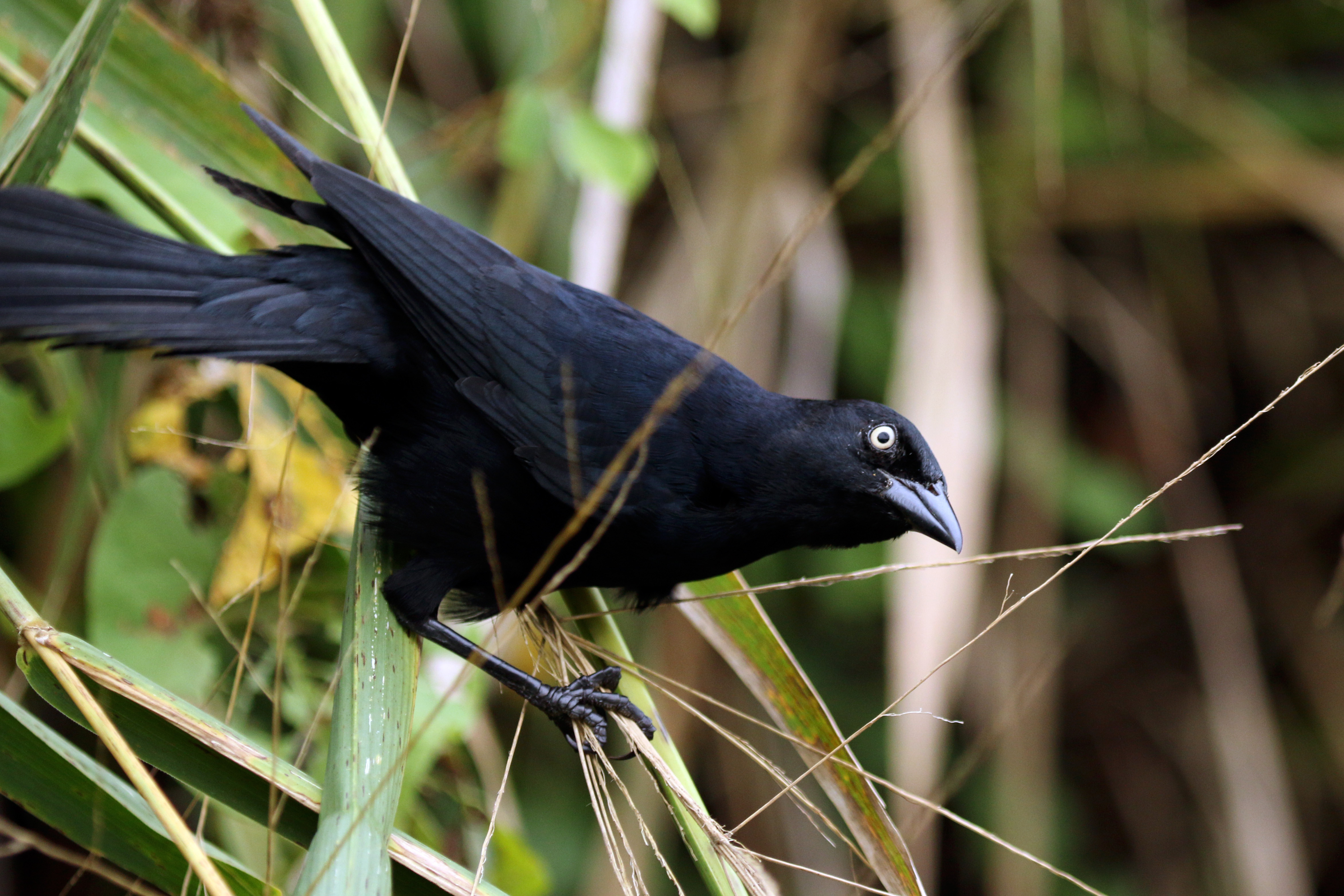
Grackle

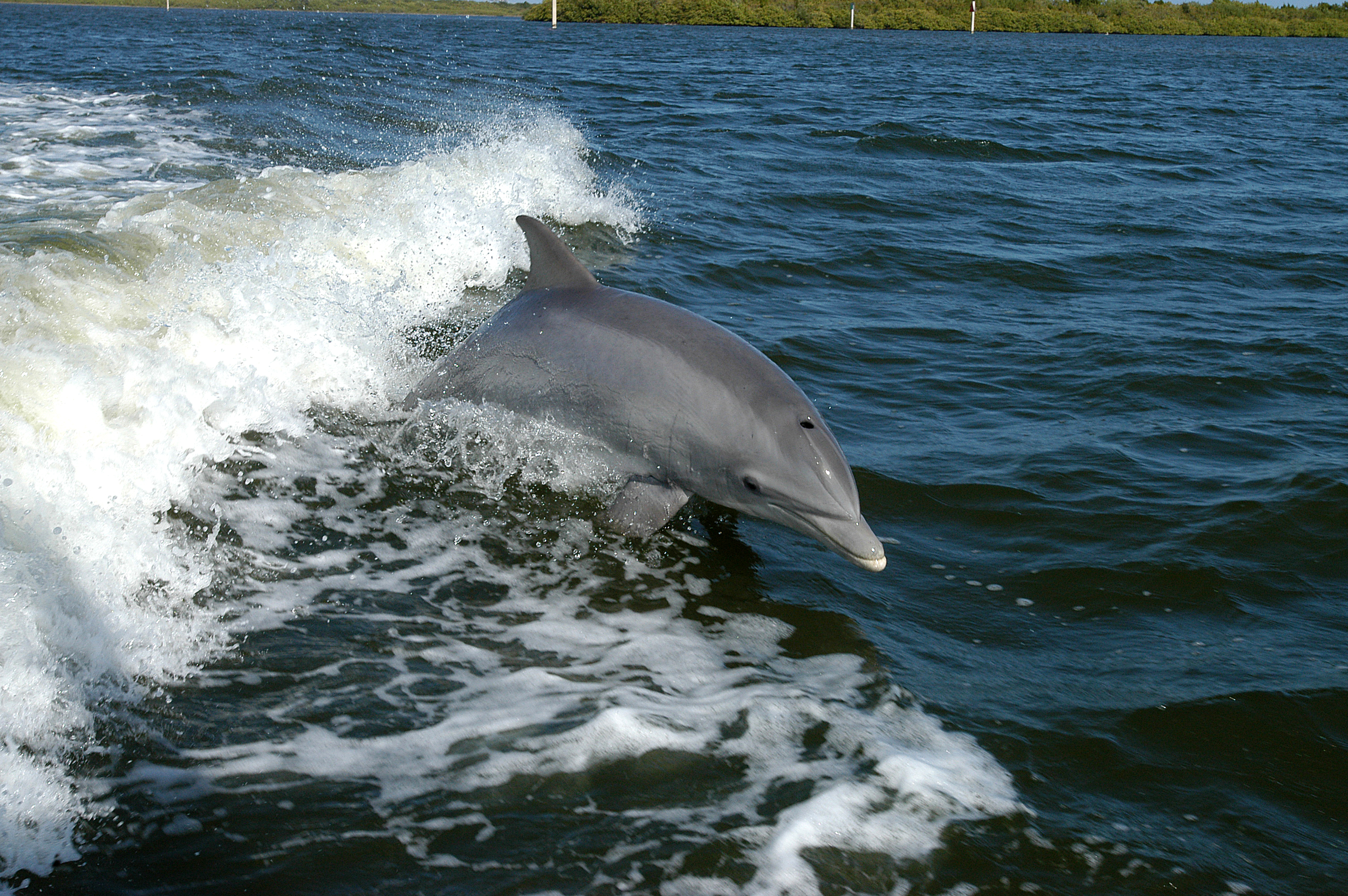
Dolphin

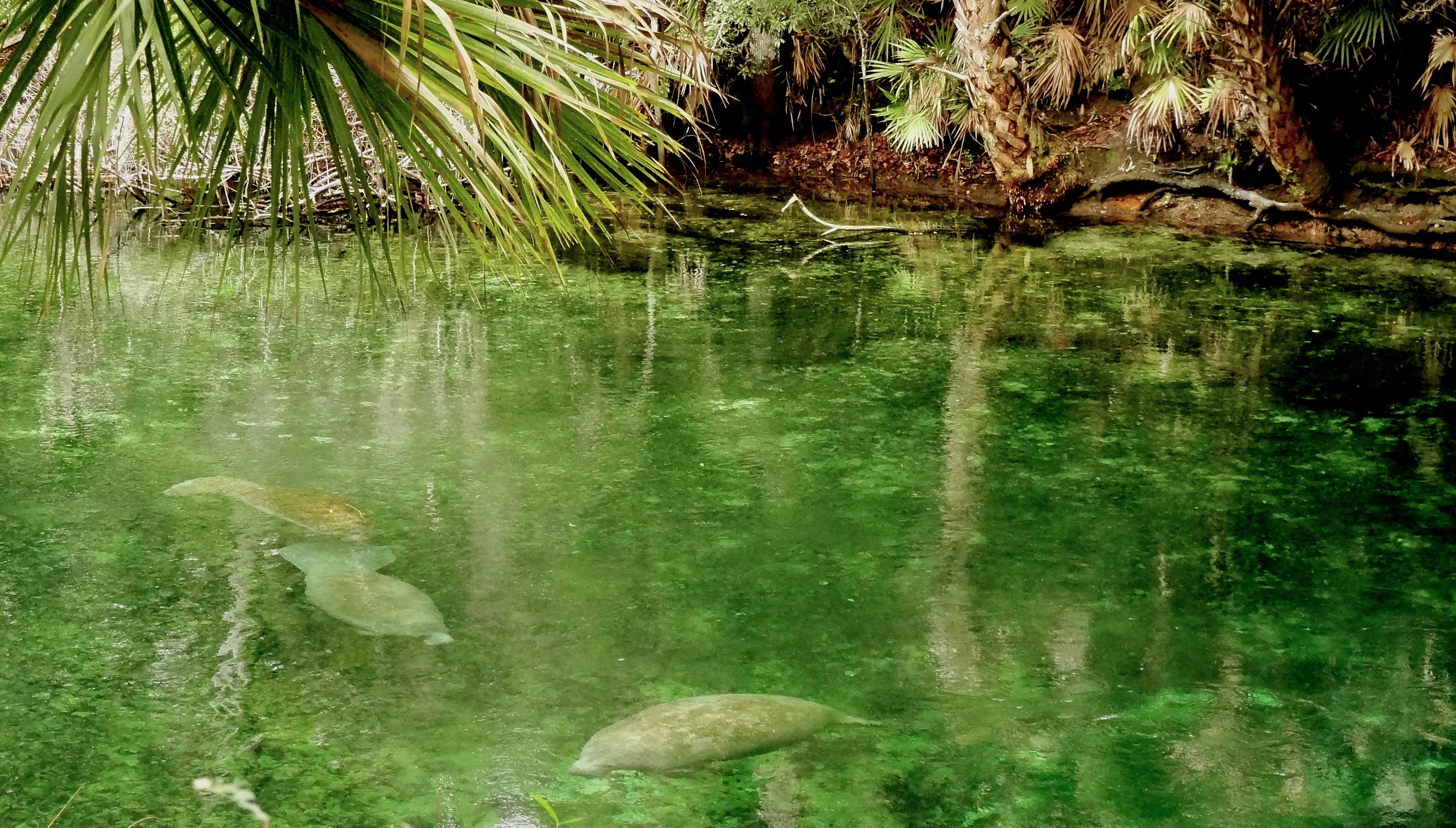
Manatee

== See also ==
- Oleta River
