= Restoration of the Everglades =

Effort to remedy 20th-century damage inflicted on the environment of southern Florida

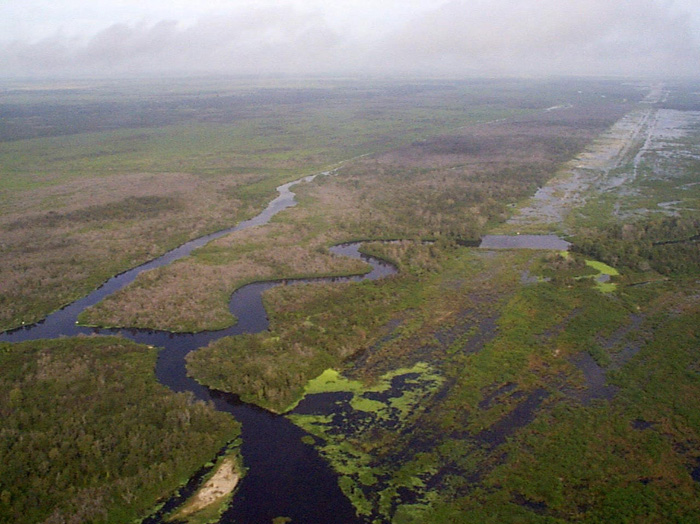
A portion of the C-38 canal, finished in 1971, now backfilled to restore the Kissimmee River floodplain to a more natural state

The Everglades, a region of tropical wetlands in southern Florida, are under an ongoing effort to remedy damage inflicted during the 20th century; it is considered the most expensive and comprehensive environmental repair attempt in history. The degradation of the Everglades became an issue in the United States in the early 1970s after a proposal to construct an airport in the Big Cypress Swamp. Studies indicated the airport would have destroyed the ecosystem in South Florida and Everglades National Park. After decades of destructive practices, both state and federal agencies are looking for ways to balance the needs of the natural environment in South Florida with urban and agricultural centers that have recently and rapidly grown in and near the Everglades.

In response to floods caused by hurricanes in 1947, the Central and Southern Florida Flood Control Project (C&SF) was established to construct flood control devices in the Everglades. The C&SF built 1,400 miles (2,300 km) of canals and levees between the 1950s and 1971 throughout South Florida. Their last venture was the C-38 canal, which straightened the Kissimmee River and caused catastrophic damage to animal habitats, adversely affecting water quality in the region. The canal became the first C&SF project to revert when the 22-mile (35 km) canal began to be backfilled, or refilled with the material excavated from it, in the 1980s.

When high levels of phosphorus and mercury were discovered in the waterways in 1986, water quality became a focus for water management agencies. Costly and lengthy court battles were waged between various government entities to determine who was responsible for monitoring and enforcing water quality standards. Governor Lawton Chiles proposed a bill that determined which agencies would have that responsibility, and set deadlines for pollutant levels to decrease in water. Initially the bill was criticized by conservation groups for not being strict enough on polluters, but the Everglades Forever Act was passed in 1994. Since then, the South Florida Water Management District (SFWMD) and the U.S. Army Corps of Engineers have surpassed expectations for achieving lower phosphorus levels.

A commission appointed by Governor Chiles published a report in 1995 stating that South Florida was unable to sustain its growth, and the deterioration of the environment was negatively affecting daily life for residents in South Florida. The environmental decline was predicted to harm tourism and commercial interests if no actions were taken to halt current trends. Results of an eight-year study that evaluated the C&SF were submitted to the United States Congress in 1999. The report warned that if no action was taken the region would rapidly deteriorate. A strategy called the Comprehensive Everglades Restoration Plan (CERP) was enacted to restore portions of the Everglades, Lake Okeechobee, the Caloosahatchee River, and Florida Bay to undo the damage of the past 50 years. It would take 30 years and cost $7.8 billion to complete. Though the plan was passed into law in 2000, it has been compromised by political and funding problems.

On June 27, 2025, a coalition led by Friends of the Everglades, the Center for Biological Diversity, and the Miccosukee Tribe of Indians filed suit in a federal court seeking an injunction against the installation of an immigration detention camp until a full environmental review and public-comment period are completed. Plaintiffs argue the project threatens endangered species habitat, including that of the Florida panther, and violates both the National Environmental Policy Act and tribal cultural-resource protections.

== Background ==
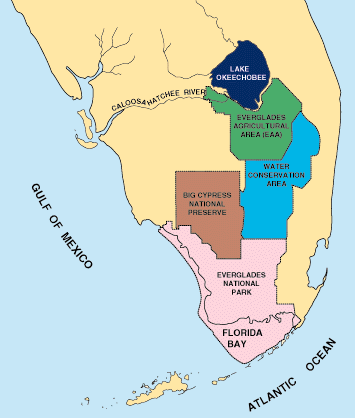
Compartments established by C&SF projects that separated the historic Everglades into Water Conservation Areas and the Everglades Agricultural Area. One-fourth of the original Everglades is preserved in Everglades National Park.

The Everglades are part of a very large watershed that begins in the vicinity of Orlando. The Kissimmee River drains into Lake Okeechobee, a 730-square-mile (1,900 km^{2}) lake with an average depth of 9 feet (2.7 m). During the wet season when the lake exceeds its capacity, the water leaves the lake in a very wide and shallow river, approximately 100 miles (160 km) long and 60 miles (97 km) wide. This wide and shallow flow is known as sheetflow. The land gradually slopes toward Florida Bay, the historical destination of most of the water leaving the Everglades. Before drainage attempts, the Everglades comprised 4,000 square miles (10,000 km^{2}), taking up a third of the Florida peninsula.

Since the early 19th century the Everglades have been a subject of interest for agricultural development. The first attempt to drain the Everglades occurred in 1882 when Pennsylvania land developer Hamilton Disston constructed the first canals. Though these attempts were largely unsuccessful, Disston's purchase of land spurred tourism and real estate development of the state. The political motivations of Governor Napoleon Bonaparte Broward resulted in more successful attempts at canal construction between 1906 and 1920. Recently reclaimed wetlands were used for cultivating sugarcane and vegetables, while urban development began in the Everglades.

The 1926 Miami Hurricane and the 1928 Okeechobee Hurricane caused widespread devastation and flooding which prompted the Army Corps of Engineers to construct a dike around Lake Okeechobee. The four-story wall cut off water from the Everglades. Floods from hurricanes in 1947 motivated the US Congress to establish the Central and Southern Florida Flood Control Project (C&SF), responsible for constructing 1,400 miles (2,300 km) of canals and levees, hundreds of pumping stations and other water control devices. The C&SF established Water Conservation Areas (WCAs) in 37% of the original Everglades, which acted as reservoirs providing excess water to the South Florida metropolitan area, or flushing it into the Atlantic Ocean or the Gulf of Mexico. The C&SF also established the Everglades Agricultural Area (EAA), which grows the majority of sugarcane crops in the United States. When the EAA was first established, it encompassed approximately 27% of the original Everglades.

By the 1960s, urban development and agricultural use had decreased the size of the Everglades considerably. The remaining 25% of the Everglades in its original state is protected in Everglades National Park, but the park was established before the C&SF, and it depended upon the actions of the C&SF to release water. As Miami and other metropolitan areas began to intrude on the Everglades in the 1960s, political battles took place between park management and the C&SF when insufficient water in the park threw ecosystems into chaos. Fertilizers used in the EAA began to alter soil and hydrology in Everglades National Park, causing the proliferation of exotic plant species. A proposition to build a massive jetport in the Big Cypress Swamp in 1969 focused attention on the degraded natural systems in the Everglades. For the first time, the Everglades became a subject of environmental conservation.

== Everglades as a priority ==
Environmental protection became a national priority in the 1970s. Time magazine declared it the Issue of the Year in January 1971, reporting that it was rated as Americans' "most serious problem confronting their community—well ahead of crime, drugs and poor schools". When South Florida experienced a severe drought from 1970 to 1975, with Miami receiving only 33 inches (840 mm) of rain in 1971—22 inches (560 mm) less than average—media attention focused on the Everglades. With the assistance of governor's aide Nathaniel Reed and U.S. Fish and Wildlife Service biologist Arthur R. Marshall, politicians began to take action. Governor Reubin Askew implemented the Land Conservation Act in 1972, allowing the state to use voter-approved bonds of $240 million to purchase land considered to be environmentally unique and irreplaceable. Since then, Florida has purchased more land for public use than any other state. In 1972 President Richard Nixon declared the Big Cypress Swamp—the intended location for the Miami jetport in 1969—to be federally protected. Big Cypress National Preserve was established in 1974, and Fakahatchee Strand State Preserve was created the same year.

In 1976, Everglades National Park was declared an International Biosphere Reserve by UNESCO, which also listed the park as a World Heritage Site in 1979. The Ramsar Convention designated the Everglades a Wetland of International Importance in 1987. Only three locations on Earth have appeared on all three lists: Everglades National Park, Lake Ichkeul in Tunisia, and Srebarna Lake in Bulgaria.

=== Kissimmee River ===
In the 1960s, the C&SF came under increased scrutiny from government overseers and conservation groups. Critics maintained its size was comparable to the Tennessee Valley Authority's dam-building projects during the Great Depression, and that the construction had run into the billions of dollars without any apparent resolution or plan. The projects of the C&SF have been characterized as part of "crisis and response" cycles that "ignored the consequence for the full system, assumed certainty of the future, and succeeded in solving the momentary crisis, but set in motion conditions that exaggerate future crises". The last project, to build a canal to straighten the winding floodplain of the Kissimmee River that had historically fed Lake Okeechobee which in turn fed the Everglades, began in 1962. Marjory Stoneman Douglas later wrote that the C&SF projects were "interrelated stupidity", crowned by the C-38 canal. Designed to replace a meandering 90-mile (140 km) river with a 52-mile (84 km) channel, the canal was completed in 1971 and cost $29 million. It supplanted approximately 45,000 acres (180 km^{2}) of marshland with retention ponds, dams, and vegetation. Loss of habitat has caused the region to experience a drastic decrease of waterfowl, wading birds, and game fish. The reclaimed floodplains were taken over by agriculture, bringing fertilizers and insecticides that washed into Lake Okeechobee. Even before the canal was finished, conservation organizations and sport fishing and hunting groups were calling for the restoration of the Kissimmee River.

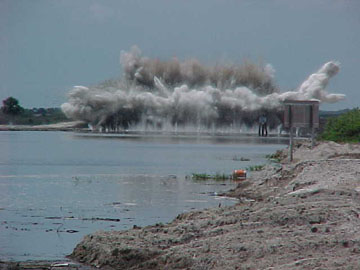
Structure 65B on the Kissimmee River is destroyed by the Corps of Engineers in 2000 to restore the natural flow of the river.

Arthur R. Marshall led the efforts to undo the damage. According to Douglas, Marshall was successful in portraying the Everglades from the Kissimmee Chain of Lakes to Florida Bay—including the atmosphere, climate, and limestone—as a single organism. Rather than remaining the preserve of conservation organizations, the cause of restoring the Everglades became a priority for politicians. Douglas observed, "Marshall accomplished the extraordinary magic of taking the Everglades out of the bleeding-hearts category forever". At the insistent urging of Marshall, newly elected Governor Bob Graham announced the formation of the "Save Our Everglades" campaign in 1983, and in 1985 Graham lifted the first shovel of backfill for a portion of the C-38 canal. Within a year the area was covered with water returning to its original state. Graham declared that by the year 2000, the Everglades would resemble its predrainage state as much as possible. The Kissimmee River Restoration Project was approved by Congress in the Water Resources Development Act of 1992. The project was estimated to cost $578 million to convert only 22 miles (35 km) of the canal; the cost was designed to be divided between the state of Florida and the U.S. government, with the state being responsible for purchasing land to be restored. A project manager for the Army Corps of Engineers explained in 2002, "What we're doing on this scale is going to be taken to a larger scale when we do the restoration of the Everglades". The entire project was originally estimated to be completed by 2011, but was completed in July 2021. In all, about 44 miles (71 km) of the Kissimmee River was restored, plus 20,000 acres of wetlands.

== Water quality ==
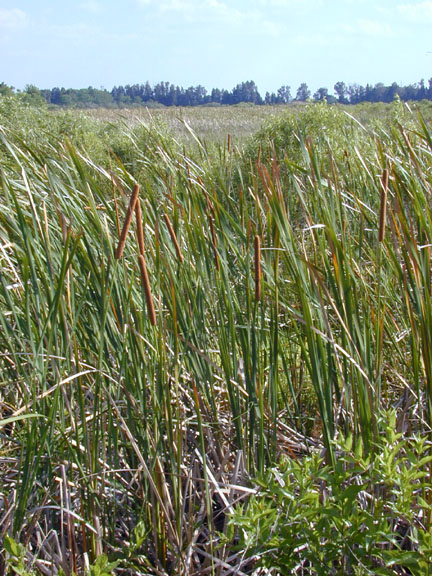
Cattails indicate the presence of phosphorus in the water. Cattails are an invasive species; they crowd out sawgrass and grow too thick to allow nesting for birds and alligators.

Attention to water quality was focused in South Florida in 1986 when a widespread algal bloom occurred in one-fifth of Lake Okeechobee. The bloom was discovered to be the result of fertilizers from the Everglades Agricultural Area. Although laws stated in 1979 that the chemicals used in the EAA should not be deposited into the lake, they were flushed into the canals that fed the Everglades Water Conservation Areas, and eventually pumped into the lake. Microbiologists discovered that, although phosphorus assists plant growth, it destroys periphyton, one of the basic building blocks of marl in the Everglades. Marl is one of two types of Everglades soil, along with peat; it is found where parts of the Everglades are flooded for shorter periods of time as layers of periphyton dry. Most of the phosphorus compounds also rid peat of dissolved oxygen and promote algae growth, causing native invertebrates to die, and sawgrass to be replaced with invasive cattails that grow too tall and thick to allow nesting for birds and alligators. Tested water showed 500 parts per billion (ppb) of phosphorus near sugarcane fields. State legislation in 1987 mandated a 40% reduction of phosphorus by 1992.

Attempts to correct phosphorus levels in the Everglades met with resistance. The sugarcane industry, dominated by two companies named U.S. Sugar and Flo-Sun, was responsible for more than half of the crop in the EAA. They were well represented in state and federal governments by lobbyists who enthusiastically protected their interests. According to the Audubon Society, the sugar industry, nicknamed "Big Sugar", donated more money to political parties and candidates than General Motors. The sugar industry attempted to block government-funded studies of polluted water, and when the federal prosecutor in Miami faulted the sugar industry in legal action to protect Everglades National Park, Big Sugar tried to get the lawsuit withdrawn and the prosecutor fired. A costly legal battle ensued from 1988 to 1992 between the State of Florida, the U.S. government, and the sugar industry to resolve who was responsible for water quality standards, the maintenance of Everglades National Park and the Arthur R. Marshall Loxahatchee National Wildlife Refuge.

A different concern about water quality arose when mercury was discovered in fish during the 1980s. Because mercury is damaging to humans, warnings were posted for fishermen that cautioned against eating fish caught in South Florida, and scientists became alarmed when a Florida panther was found dead near Shark River Slough with mercury levels high enough to be fatal to humans. When mercury is ingested it adversely affects the central nervous system, and can cause brain damage and birth defects. Studies of mercury levels found that it is bioaccumulated through the food chain: animals that are lower on the chain have decreased amounts, but as larger animals eat them, the amount of mercury is multiplied. The dead panther's diet consisted of small animals, including raccoons and young alligators. The source of the mercury was found to be waste incinerators and fossil fuel power plants that expelled the element in the atmosphere, which precipitated with rain, or in the dry season, dust. Naturally occurring bacteria in the Everglades that function to reduce sulfur also transform mercury deposits into methylmercury. This process was more dramatic in areas where flooding was not as prevalent. Because of requirements that reduced power plant and incinerator emissions, the levels of mercury found in larger animals decreased as well: approximately a 60% decrease in fish and a 70% decrease in birds, though some levels still remain a health concern for people.

=== Everglades Forever Act ===
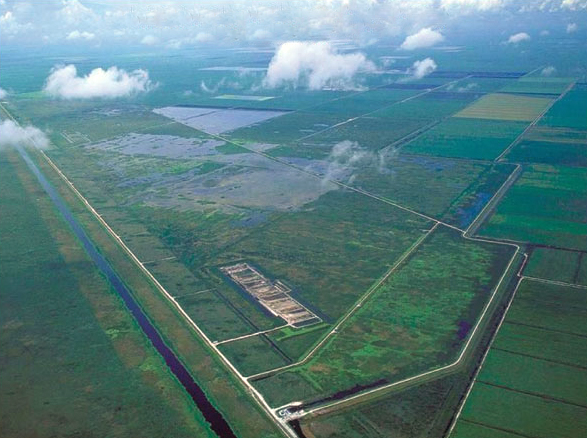
Aerial view of stormwater treatment areas in the northern Everglades bordered by sugarcane fields on the right

In an attempt to resolve the political quagmire over water quality, Governor Lawton Chiles introduced a bill in 1994 to clean up water within the EAA that was being released to the lower Everglades. The bill stated that the "Everglades ecosystem must be restored both in terms of water quality and water quantity and must be preserved and protected in a manner that is long term and comprehensive". It ensured the Florida Department of Environmental Protection (DEP) and the South Florida Water Management District (SFWMD) would be responsible for researching water quality, enforcing water supply improvement, controlling exotic species, and collecting taxes, with the aim of decreasing the levels of phosphorus in the region. It allowed for purchase of land where pollutants would be sent to "treat and improve the quality of waters coming from the EAA".

Critics of the bill argued that the deadline for meeting the standards was unnecessarily delayed until 2006—a period of 12 years—to enforce better water quality. They also maintained that it did not force sugarcane farmers, who were the primary polluters, to pay enough of the costs, and increased the threshold of what was an acceptable amount of phosphorus in water from 10 ppb to 50 ppb. Governor Chiles initially named it the Marjory Stoneman Douglas Act, but Douglas was so unimpressed with the action it took against polluters that she wrote to Chiles and demanded her name be stricken from it. Despite criticism, the Florida legislature passed the Act in 1994. The SFWMD stated that its actions have exceeded expectations earlier than anticipated, by creating Stormwater Treatment Areas (STA) within the EAA that contain a calcium-based substance such as lime rock layered between peat, and filled with calcareous periphyton. Early tests by the Army Corps of Engineers revealed this method reduced phosphorus levels from 80 ppb to 10 ppb. The STAs are intended to treat water until the phosphorus levels are low enough to be released into the Loxahatchee National Wildlife Refuge or other WCAs.

== Wildlife concerns ==
The intrusion of urban areas into wilderness has had a substantial impact on wildlife, and several species of animals are considered endangered in the Everglades region. One animal that has benefited from endangered species protection is the American alligator (Alligator mississippiensis), whose holes give refuge to other animals, often allowing many species to survive during times of drought. Once abundant in the Everglades, the alligator was listed as an endangered species in 1967, but a combined effort by federal and state organizations and the banning of alligator hunting allowed it to rebound; it was pronounced fully recovered in 1987 and is no longer an endangered species. However, alligators' territories and average body masses have been found to be generally smaller than in the past, and because populations have been reduced, their role during droughts has become limited.

The American Crocodile (Crocodylus acutus) is also native to the region and has been designated as endangered since 1975. Unlike their relatives the alligators, crocodiles tend to thrive in brackish or salt-water habitats such as estuarine or marine coasts. Their most significant threat is disturbance by people. Too much contact with humans causes females to abandon their nests, and males in particular are often victims of vehicle collisions while roaming over large territories and attempting to cross U.S. 1 and Card Sound Road in the Florida Keys. There are an estimated 500 to 1,000 crocodiles in southern Florida.

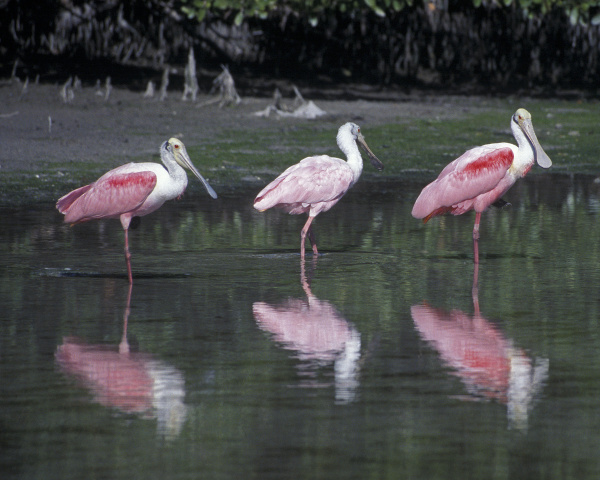
Roseate spoonbills, along with other wading birds, have decreased by 90% since the 1930s and 1940s.

The most critically endangered of any animal in the Everglades region is the Florida panther (Puma concolor coryi), a species that once lived throughout the southeastern United States: there were only 25–30 in the wild in 1995. The panther is most threatened by urban encroachment, because males require approximately 200 square miles (520 km^{2}) for breeding territory. A male and two to five females may live within that range. When habitat is lost, panthers will fight over territory. After vehicle collisions, the second most frequent cause of death for panthers is intra-species aggression. In the 1990s urban expansion crowded panthers from southwestern Florida as Naples and Ft. Myers began to expand into the western Everglades and Big Cypress Swamp. Agencies such as the Army Corps of Engineers and the U.S. Fish and Wildlife Service were responsible for maintaining the Clean Water Act and the Endangered Species Act, yet still approved 99% of all permits to build in wetlands and panther territory. A limited genetic pool is also a danger. Biologists introduced eight female Texas cougars (Puma concolor) in 1995 to diversify genes, and there are between 80 and 120 panthers in the wild as of 2008.

Perhaps the most dramatic loss of any group of animals has been to wading birds. Their numbers were estimated by eyewitness accounts to be approximately 2.5 million in the late 19th century. However, snowy egrets (Egretta thula), roseate spoonbills (Platalea ajaja), and reddish egrets (Egretta rufescens) were hunted to the brink of extinction for the colorful feathers used in women's hats. After about 1920 when the fashion passed, their numbers returned in the 1930s, but over the next 50 years actions by the C&SF further disturbed populations. When the canals were constructed, natural water flow was restricted from the mangrove forests near the coast of Florida Bay. From one wet season to the next, fish were unable to reach traditional locations to repopulate when water was withheld by the C&SF. Birds were forced to fly farther from their nests to forage for food. By the 1970s, bird numbers had decreased 90%. Many of the birds moved to smaller colonies in the WCAs to be closer to a food source, making them more difficult to count. Yet they remain significantly fewer in number than before the canals were constructed.

=== Invasive species ===
Around 6 million people moved to South Florida between 1940 and 1965. With a thousand people moving to Miami each week, urban development quadrupled. As the human population grew rapidly, the problem of exotic plant and animal species also grew. Many species of plants were brought into South Florida from Asia, Central America, or Australia as decorative landscaping. Exotic animals imported by the pet trade have escaped or been released. Biological controls that keep invasive species smaller in size and fewer in number in their native lands often do not exist in the Everglades, and they compete with the embattled native species for food and space. Of imported plant species, melaleuca trees (Melaleuca quinquenervia) have caused the most problems. Melaleucas grow on average 100 feet (30 m) in the Everglades, as opposed to 25 to 60 feet (7.6 to 18.3 m) in their native Australia. They were brought to southern Florida as windbreaks and deliberately seeded in marsh areas because they absorb vast amounts of water. In a region that is regularly shaped by fire, melaleucas are fire-resistant and their seeds are more efficiently spread by fire. They are too dense for wading birds with large wingspans to nest in, and they choke out native vegetation. Costs of controlling melaleucas topped $2 million in 1998 for Everglades National Park. In Big Cypress National Preserve, melaleucas covered 186 square miles (480 km^{2}) at their most pervasive in the 1990s.

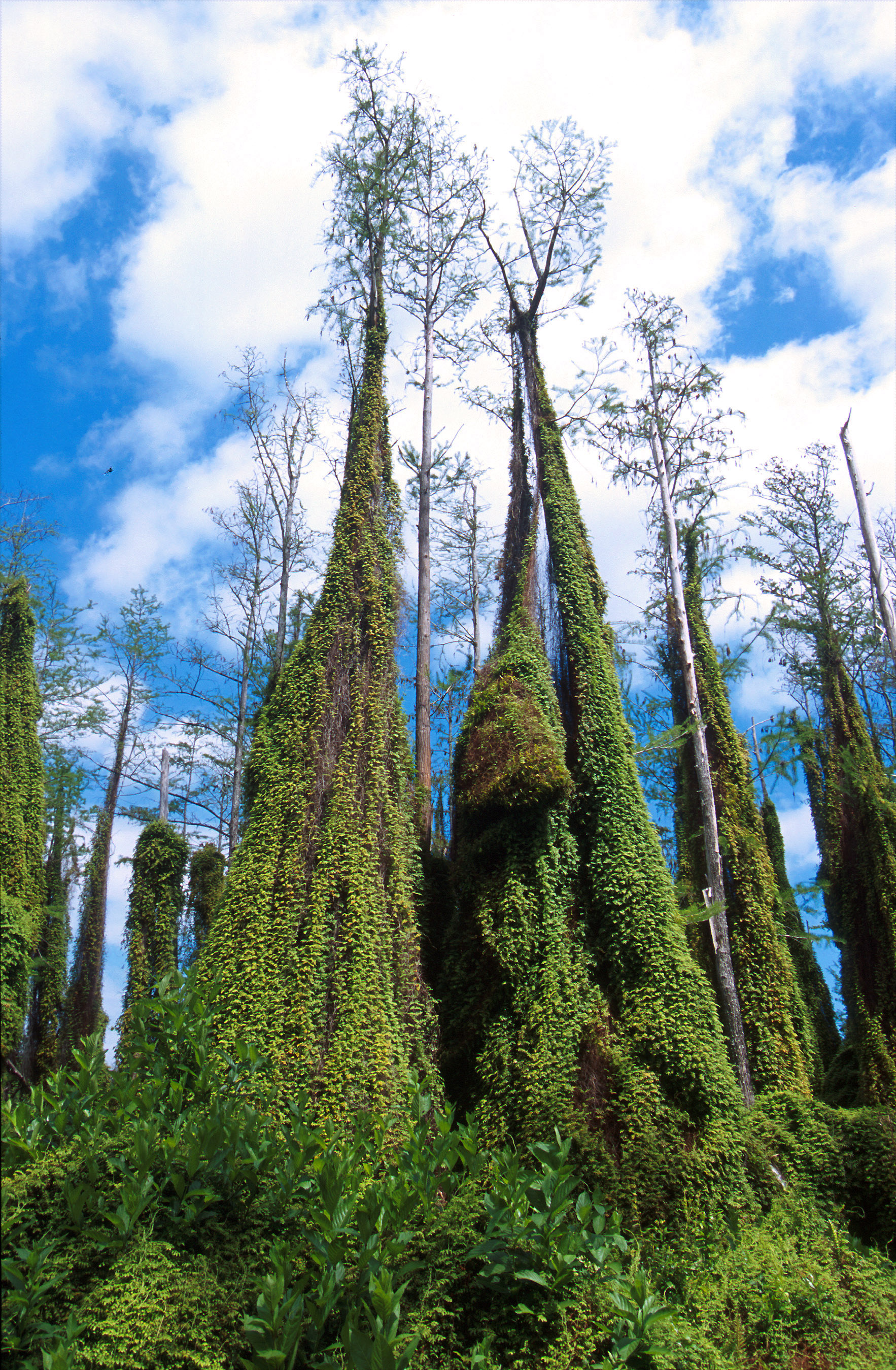
Climbing ferns overtake cypress trees in the Everglades. The ferns act as "fire ladders" that can destroy trees that would otherwise survive fires.

Brazilian pepper (Schinus terebinthifolius) was brought to Southern Florida as an ornamental shrub and was dispersed by the droppings of birds and other animals that ate its bright red berries. It thrives on abandoned agricultural land growing in forests too dense for wading birds to nest in, similar to melaleucas. It grows rapidly especially after hurricanes and has invaded pineland forests. Following Hurricane Andrew, scientists and volunteers cleared damaged pinelands of Brazilian pepper so the native trees would be able to return to their natural state.

The species that is causing the most impediment to restoration is the Old World climbing fern (Lygodium microphyllum), introduced in 1965. The fern grows rapidly and thickly on the ground, making passage for land animals such as black bears and panthers problematic. The ferns also grow as vines into taller portions of trees, and fires climb the ferns in "fire ladders" to scorch portions of the trees that are not naturally resistant to fire.

Several animal species have been introduced to Everglades waterways. Many tropical fish are released, the most detrimental being the blue tilapia (Oreochromis aureus), which builds large nests in shallow waters. Tilapia also consume vegetation which would normally be used by young native fishes for cover and protection.

Reptiles have a particular affinity for the South Florida ecosystem. Virtually all lizards appearing in the Everglades have been introduced, such as the brown anole (Anolis sagrei) and the tropical house gecko (Hemidactylus mabouia). The herbivorous green iguana (Iguana iguana) can reproduce rapidly in wilderness habitats. However, the reptile that has earned media attention for its size and potential to harm children and domestic pets is the Burmese python (Python bivittatus), which has spread quickly throughout the area. The python can grow up to 20 feet (6.1 m) long and competes with alligators for the top of the food chain.

Though exotic birds such as parrots and parakeets are also found in the Everglades, their impact is negligible. Conversely, perhaps the animal that causes the most damage to native wildlife is the domestic or feral cat. Across the U.S., cats are responsible for approximately a billion bird deaths annually. They are estimated to number 640 per square mile; cats living in suburban areas have devastating effects on migratory birds and marsh rabbits.

=== Homestead Air Force Base ===
Hurricane Andrew struck Miami in 1992, with catastrophic damage to Homestead Air Force Base in Homestead. A plan to rejuvenate the property in 1993 and convert it into a commercial airport was met with enthusiasm from local municipal and commercial entities hoping to recoup $480 million and 11,000 jobs lost in the local community by the destruction and subsequent closing of the base. On March 31, 1994, the base was designated as a reserve base, functioning only part-time. A cursory environmental study performed by the Air Force was deemed insufficient by local conservation groups, who threatened to sue in order to halt the acquisition when estimates of 650 flights a day were projected. Groups had previously been alarmed in 1990 by the inclusion of Homestead Air Force Base on a list of the U.S. Government's most polluted properties. Their concerns also included noise, and the inevitable collisions with birds using the mangrove forests as rookeries. The Air Force base is located between Everglades National Park and Biscayne National Park, giving it the potential to cause harm to both. In 2000, Secretary of the Interior Bruce Babbitt and the director of the U.S. Environmental Protection Agency expressed their opposition to the project, despite other Clinton Administration agencies previously working to ensure the base would be turned over to local agencies quickly and smoothly as "a model of base disposal". Although attempts were made to make the base more environmentally friendly, in 2001 local commercial interests promoting the airport lost federal support.

== Comprehensive Everglades Restoration Plan ==
=== Sustainable South Florida ===
Despite the successes of the Everglades Forever Act and the decreases in mercury levels, the focus intensified on the Everglades in the 1990s as quality of life in the South Florida metropolitan areas diminished. It was becoming clear that urban populations were consuming increasingly unsustainable levels of natural resources. A report entitled "The Governor's Commission for a Sustainable South Florida", submitted to Lawton Chiles in 1995, identified the problems the state and municipal governments were facing. The report remarked that the degradation of the natural quality of the Everglades, Florida Bay, and other bodies of water in South Florida would cause a significant decrease in tourism (12,000 jobs and $200 million annually) and income from compromised commercial fishing (3,300 jobs and $52 million annually). The report noted that past abuses and neglect of the environment had brought the region to "a precipitous juncture" where the inhabitants of South Florida faced health hazards in polluted air and water; furthermore, crowded and unsafe urban conditions hurt the reputation of the state. It noted that though the population had increased by 90% over the previous two decades, registered vehicles had increased by 166%. On the quality and availability of water, the report stated, "[The] frequent water shortages ... create the irony of a natural system dying of thirst in a subtropical environment with over 53 inches of rain per year".

Restoration of the Everglades, however, briefly became a bipartisan cause in national politics. A controversial penny-a-pound (2 cent/kg) tax on sugar was proposed to fund some of the necessary changes to be made to help decrease phosphorus and make other improvements to water. State voters were asked to support the tax, and environmentalists paid $15 million to encourage the issue. Sugar lobbyists responded with $24 million in advertising to discourage it and succeeded; it became the most expensive ballot issue in state history. How restoration might be funded became a political battleground and seemed to stall without resolution. However, in the 1996 election year, Republican senator Bob Dole proposed that Congress give the State of Florida $200 million to acquire land for the Everglades. Democratic Vice President Al Gore promised the federal government would purchase 100,000 acres (400 km^{2}) of land in the EAA to turn it over for restoration. Politicking reduced the number to 50,000 acres (200 km^{2}), but both Dole's and Gore's gestures were approved by Congress.

=== Central and South Florida Project Restudy ===
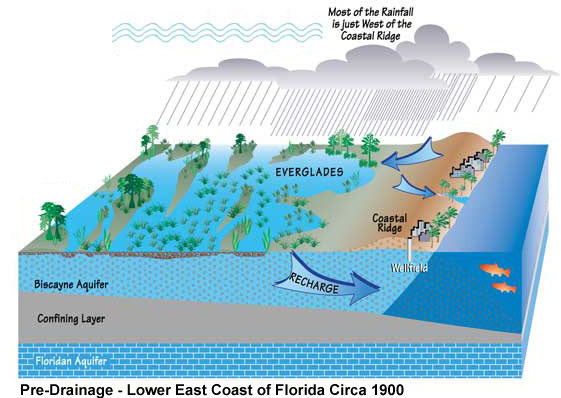
Natural water drainage patterns prior to development in South Florida, circa 1900

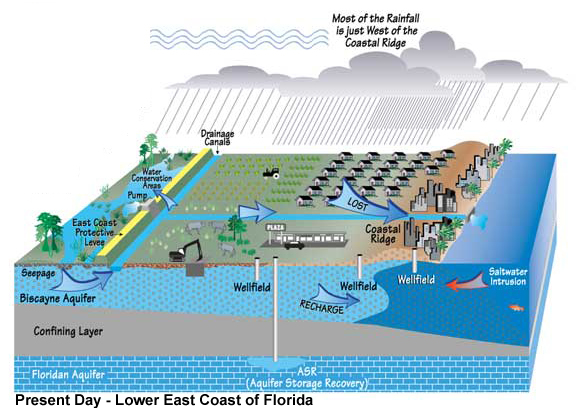
Current water drainage patterns in South Florida in 2005

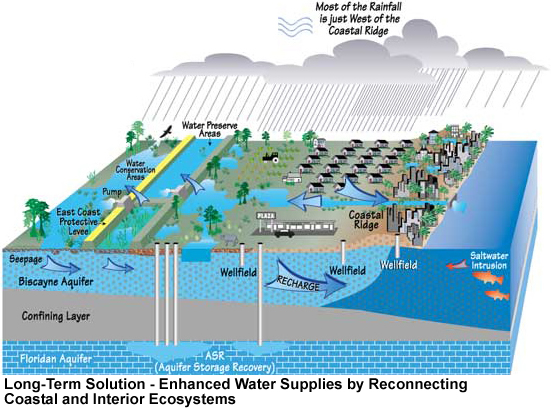
Planned water recovery and storage implementation using CERP strategies

As part of the Water Resources Development Act of 1992, Congress authorized an evaluation of the effectiveness of the Central and Southern Florida Flood Control Project. A report known as the "Restudy", written by the U.S. Army Corps of Engineers and the South Florida Water Management District, was submitted to Congress in 1999. It cited indicators of harm to the system: a 50% reduction in the original Everglades, diminished water storage, harmful timing of water release, an 85 to 90% decrease in wading bird populations over the past 50 years, and the decline of output from commercial fisheries. Bodies of water including Lake Okeechobee, the Caloosahatchee River, St. Lucie estuary, Lake Worth Lagoon, Biscayne Bay, Florida Bay, and the Everglades reflected drastic water level changes, hypersalinity, and dramatic changes in marine and freshwater ecosystems. The Restudy noted the overall decline in water quality over the past 50 years was caused by loss of wetlands that act as filters for polluted water. It predicted that without intervention the entire South Florida ecosystem would deteriorate. Canals took roughly 170 billion US gallons (640 Gl) of water to the Atlantic Ocean or Gulf of Mexico daily, so there was no opportunity for water storage, yet flooding was still a problem. Without changes to the current system, the Restudy predicted water restrictions would be necessary every other year, and annually in some locations. It also warned that revising some portions of the project without dedicating efforts to an overall comprehensive plan would be insufficient and probably detrimental.

After evaluating ten plans, the Restudy recommended a comprehensive strategy that would cost $7.8 billion over 20 years. The plan advised taking the following actions:

- Create surface water storage reservoirs to capture 1,500,000 acre-feet (1.9 km^{3}) of water in several locations taking up 181,300 acres (734 km^{2}).
- Create water preserve areas between Miami-Dade and Palm Beach and the eastern Everglades to treat runoff water.
- Manage Lake Okeechobee as an ecological resource to avoid the drastic rise and fall of water levels in the lake that are harmful to aquatic plant and animal life and disturb the lake sediments.
- Improve water deliveries to estuaries to reduce the rapid discharge of excess water to the Caloosahatchee and St. Lucie estuaries that upset nutrient balances and cause lesions on fish. Stormwater discharge would be sent instead to reservoirs.
- Increase underground water storage to hold 16 billion US gallons (61 Gl) a day in wells, or reservoirs in the Floridan Aquifer, to be used later in dry periods, in a method called Aquifer Storage and Recovery (ASR).
- Construct treatment wetlands as Stormwater Treatment Areas throughout 35,600 acres (144 km^{2}), that would decrease the amount of pollutants in the environment.
- Improve water deliveries to the Everglades by increasing them at a rate of approximately 26% into Shark River Slough.
- Remove barriers to sheetflow by destroying or removing 240 miles (390 km) of canals and levees, specifically removing the Miami Canal and reconstructing the Tamiami Trail from a highway to culverts and bridges to allow sheetflow to return to a more natural rate of water flow into Everglades National Park.
- Store water in quarries and reuse wastewater by employing existing quarries to supply the South Florida metropolitan area as well as Florida Bay and the Everglades. Construct two wastewater treatment plants capable of discharging 22 billion US gallons (83 Gl) a day to recharge the Biscayne Aquifer.

The implementation of all of the advised actions, the report stated, would "result in the recovery of healthy, sustainable ecosystems throughout south Florida". The report admitted that it did not have all the answers, though no plan could. However, it predicted that it would restore the "essential defining features of the pre-drainage wetlands over large portions of the remaining system", that populations of all animals would increase, and animal distribution patterns would return to their natural states. Critics expressed concern over some unused technology; scientists were unsure if the quarries would hold as much water as was being suggested, and whether the water would harbor harmful bacteria from the quarries. Overtaxing the aquifers was another concern—it was not a technique that had been previously attempted.

Though it was optimistic, the Restudy noted,

It is important to understand that the 'restored' Everglades of the future will be different from any version of the Everglades that has existed in the past. While it certainly will be vastly superior to the current ecosystem, it will not completely match the pre-drainage system. This is not possible, in light of the irreversible physical changes that have made (sic) to the ecosystem. It will be an Everglades that is smaller and somewhat differently arranged than the historic ecosystem. But it will be a successfully restored Everglades, because it will have recovered those hydrological and biological patterns which defined the original Everglades, and which made it unique among the world's wetland systems. It will become a place that kindles the wildness and richness of the former Everglades.

The report was the result of many cooperating agencies that often had conflicting goals. An initial draft was submitted to Everglades National Park management who asserted not enough water would be released to the park quickly enough—that the priority went to delivering water to urban areas. When they threatened to refuse to support it, the plan was rewritten to provide more water to the park. However, the Miccosukee Indians have a reservation in between the park and water control devices, and they threatened to sue to ensure their tribal lands and a $50 million casino would not be flooded. Other special interests were also concerned that businesses and residents would take second priority after nature. The Everglades, however, proved to be a bipartisan cause. The Comprehensive Everglades Restoration Plan (CERP) was authorized by the Water Resources Development Act of 2000 and signed into law by President Bill Clinton on December 11, 2000. It approved the immediate use of $1.3 billion for implementation to be split by the federal government and other sources.

=== Implementation ===
The State of Florida reports that it has spent more than $2 billion on the various projects since CERP was signed. More than 36,000 acres (150 km^{2}) of Stormwater Treatment Areas (STA) have been constructed to filter 2,500 short tons (2,300 t) of phosphorus from Everglades waters. An STA covering 17,000 acres (69 km^{2}) was constructed in 2004, making it the largest environmental restoration project in the world. Fifty-five percent of the land necessary for restoration, totaling 210,167 acres (850.5 km^{2}), has been purchased by the State of Florida. A plan named "Acceler8", to hasten the construction and funding of the project, was put into place, spurring the start of six of eight construction projects, including that of three large reservoirs.

A changing economy, too, hurt the plan. It passed in a year with a record budget surplus, but the climate changed sharply after the terrorist attacks of 2001. Some state officials say the plan, which involves dozens of complex engineering projects, also got bogged down in federal bureaucracy, a victim of "analysis paralysis."

— The New York Times, November 2007

Despite the bipartisan goodwill and declarations of the importance of the Everglades, the region still remains in danger. Political maneuvering continues to impede CERP: sugar lobbyists promoted a bill in the Florida legislature in 2003 that increased the acceptable amount of phosphorus in Everglades waterways from 10 ppb to 15 ppb and extended the deadline for the mandated decrease by 20 years. A compromise of 2016 was eventually reached. Environmental organizations express concern that attempts to speed up some of the construction through Acceler8 are politically motivated; the six projects Acceler8 focuses on do not provide more water to natural areas in desperate need of it, but rather to projects in populated areas bordering the Everglades, suggesting that water is being diverted to make room for more people in an already overtaxed environment. Though Congress promised half the funds for restoration, after the War in Iraq began and two of CERP's major supporters in Congress retired, the federal role in CERP was left unfulfilled. According to a story in The New York Times, state officials say the restoration is lost in a maze of "federal bureaucracy, a victim of 'analysis paralysis'". In 2007, the release of $2 billion for Everglades restoration was approved by Congress, overriding President George W. Bush's veto of the entire Water Development Project the money was a part of. Bush's rare veto went against the wishes of Florida Republicans, including his brother, Governor Jeb Bush. A lack of subsequent action by the Congress prompted Governor Charlie Crist to travel to Washington, D.C., in February 2008 and inquire about the promised funds. By June 2008, the federal government had spent only $400 million of the $7.8 billion legislated. Carl Hiaasen characterized George W. Bush's attitude toward the environment as "long-standing indifference" in June 2008, exemplified when Bush stated he would not intervene to change the Environmental Protection Agency's (EPA) policy allowing the release of water polluted with fertilizers and phosphorus into the Everglades.

=== Reassessment of CERP ===
Florida still receives a thousand new residents daily and lands slated for restoration and wetland recovery are often bought and sold before the state has a chance to bid on them. The competitive pricing of real estate also drives it beyond the purchasing ability of the state. Because the State of Florida is assisting with purchasing lands and funding construction, some of the programs under CERP are vulnerable to state budget cuts. In June 2008 Governor Crist announced that the State of Florida will buy U.S. Sugar for $1.7 billion. The idea came when sugar lobbyists were trying to persuade Crist to relax restriction of U.S. Sugar's practice of pumping phosphorus-laden water into the Everglades. According to one of the lobbyists who characterized it as a "duh moment", Crist said, "If sugar is polluting the Everglades, and we're paying to clean the Everglades, why don't we just get rid of sugar?". The largest producer of cane sugar in the U.S. will continue operations for six years, and when ownership transfers to Florida, 187,000 acres (760 km^{2}) of the Everglades will remain undeveloped to allow it to be restored to its pre-drainage state.

In September 2008 the National Research Council (NRC), a nonprofit agency providing science and policy advice to the federal government, submitted a report on the progress of CERP. The report noted "scant progress" in restoration because of problems in budgeting, planning, and bureaucracy. The NRC report called the Everglades one of the "world's treasured ecosystems" that is being further endangered by lack of progress: "Ongoing delay in Everglades restoration has not only postponed improvements—it has allowed ecological decline to continue". It cited the shrinking tree islands, and the negative population growth of the endangered Rostrhamus sociabilis or Everglades snail kite, and Ammodramus maritimus mirabilis, the Cape Sable seaside sparrow. The lack of water reaching Everglades National Park was characterized as "one of the most discouraging stories" in implementation of the plan. The NRC recommended improving planning on the state and federal levels, evaluating each CERP project annually, and further acquisition of land for restoration. Everglades restoration was earmarked $96 million in federal funds as part of the American Recovery and Reinvestment Act of 2009 with the intention of providing civil service and construction jobs while simultaneously implementing the legislated repair projects.

In January 2010, work began on the C-111 canal, built in the 1960s to drain irrigated farmland, to reconstruct it to keep from diverting water from Everglades National Park. Two other projects focusing on restoration were also scheduled to start in 2010. Governor Crist announced the same month that $50 million would be earmarked for Everglades restoration. In April of the same year, a federal district court judge sharply criticized both state and federal failures to meet deadlines, describing the cleanup efforts as being slowed by "glacial delay" and government neglect of environmental law enforcement "incomprehensible".

== See also ==
- Agriculture in Florida
- Draining and development of the Everglades
- Everglades National Park
- Geography and ecology of the Everglades
- History of Miami, Florida
- Indigenous people of the Everglades region

== Bibliography ==
- Barnett, Cynthia (2007). Mirage: Florida and the Vanishing Water of the Eastern U.S., University of Michigan Press. ISBN 0-472-11563-4
- Douglas, Marjory; Rothchild, John (1987). Marjory Stoneman Douglas: Voice of the River. Pineapple Press. ISBN 0-910923-94-9
- Grunwald, Michael (2006). The Swamp: The Everglades, Florida, and the Politics of Paradise, Simon & Schuster. ISBN 0-7432-5107-5
- Lodge, Thomas E. (1994). The Everglades Handbook: Understanding the Ecosystem. CRC Press. ISBN 1-56670-614-9
- U.S. Army Corps of Engineers and South Florida Water Management District (April 1999). "Summary", Central and Southern Florida Project Comprehensive Review Study.
