= Geography and ecology of the Everglades =

Natural environment in southern Florida, US

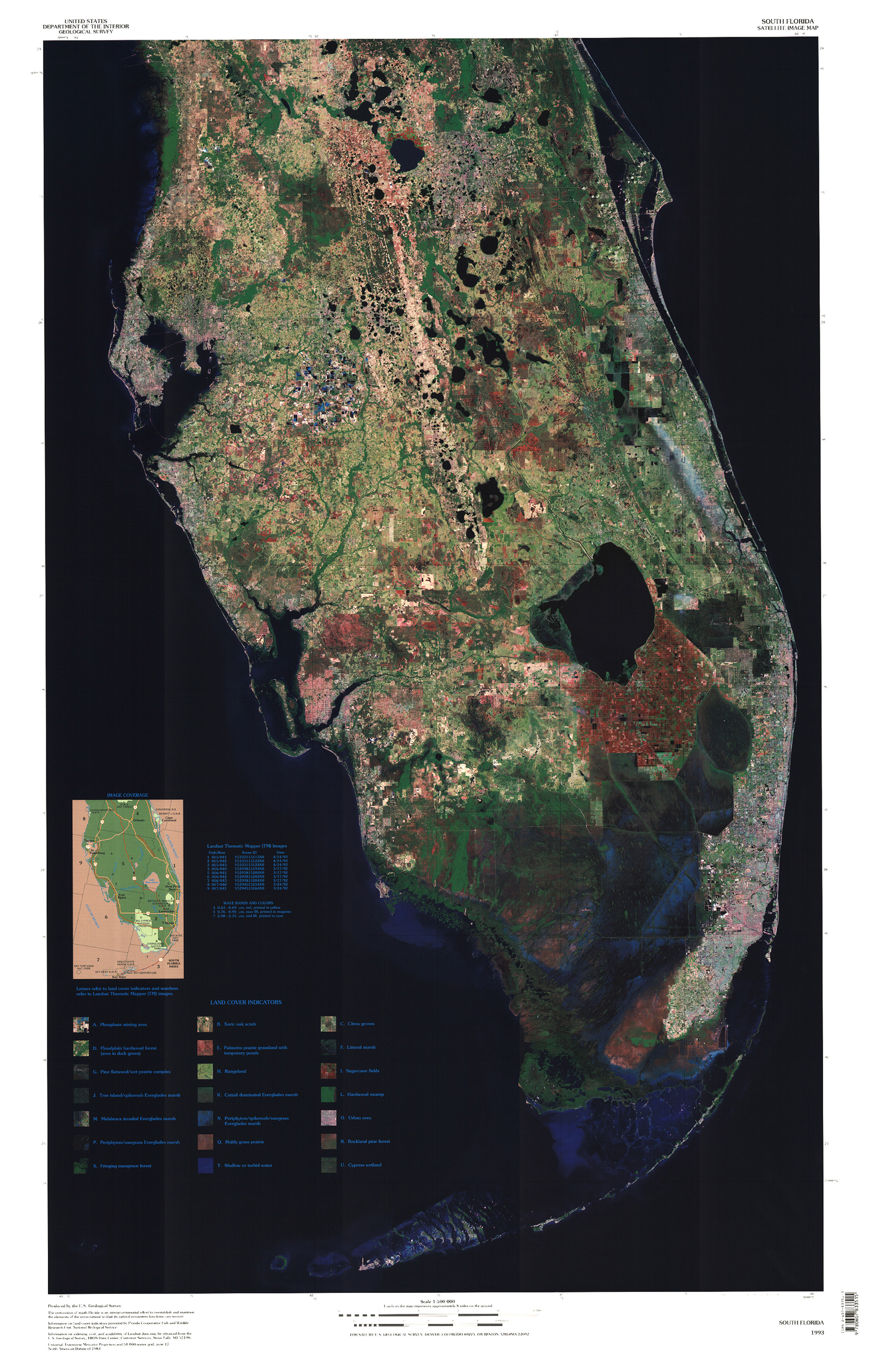
A satellite image of the lower Florida peninsula showing darkened portions south of Lake Okeechobee as the Everglades and Big Cypress Swamp. The reddish area bordering the large inland lake is the Everglades Agricultural Area.

Satellite image taken in March 2019 shows southeast of the Everglades, including Cape Sable and Florida Bay. Miami is on the right side.

The Everglades is both a vast watershed in southern Florida and many interconnected tropical wetlands ecosystems within a geographic boundary. Formed about 5,000 years ago, it has historically covered around one-third of the southern Florida peninsula, from Lake Okeechobee 100 miles (160 km) south to Florida Bay. Before drainage, its interwoven mesh of marshes and prairies covered 4,000 square miles (10,000 km^{2}).

It is such a unique meeting of water, land, and climate that the use of either singular or plural to refer to the Everglades is appropriate. When Marjory Stoneman Douglas wrote her definitive description of the region in 1947, she used the metaphor "River of Grass" to explain the blending of water and plant life.

Although sawgrass and sloughs are the enduring geographical icons of the Everglades, other ecosystems are just as vital, and the borders marking them are subtle or nonexistent. Pinelands and tropical hardwood hammocks are located throughout the sloughs; the trees, rooted in soil inches above the peat, marl, or water, support a variety of wildlife. The oldest and tallest trees are cypresses, whose roots are specially adapted to grow underwater for months at a time. The Big Cypress Swamp is well known for its 500-year-old cypresses, though cypress domes can appear throughout the Everglades. As the freshwater from Lake Okeechobee makes its way to Florida Bay, it meets saltwater from the Gulf of Mexico; mangrove forests grow in this transitional zone, providing nursery and nesting conditions for many species of birds, fish, and invertebrates. The marine environment of Florida Bay is also considered part of the Everglades because its seagrasses and aquatic life are attracted to the constant discharge of freshwater.

These ecological systems are always changing due to environmental factors. Geographic features such as the Western Flatwoods, Eastern Flatwoods, and Atlantic Coastal Ridge affect drainage patterns. Geologic elements, climate, and the frequency of storms and fire are formative processes for the Everglades. They help to sustain and transform the ecosystems in the Shark River Valley, Big Cypress Swamp, coastal areas, and mangrove forests. Ecosystems have been described as both fragile and resilient. Minor fluctuations in water levels have far-reaching consequences for many plant and animal species, and the system cycles and pulses with each change.

== Shaping processes of ecosystems ==
At only 5,000 years of age, the Everglades is a young region in geological terms. Its ecosystems are in constant flux as a result of the interplay of three factors: the type and amount of water present, the geology of the region, and the frequency and severity of fires.

=== Water ===
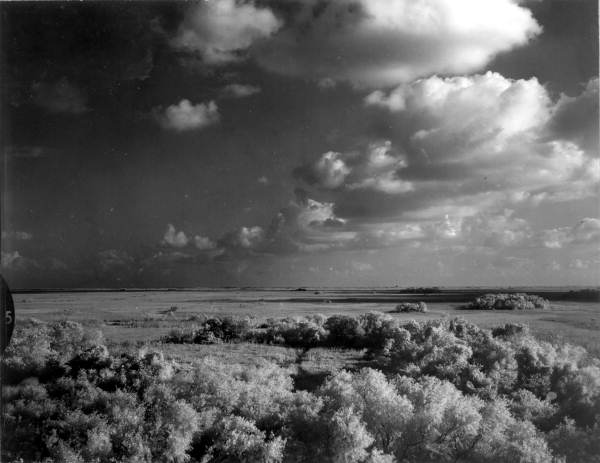
A storm over the Shark River in the Everglades, 1966. Photo: Charles Barron/State Library and Archives of Florida.

Water is the dominant element in the Everglades, and it shapes the land, vegetation, and animal life of South Florida. The South Florida climate was once arid and semi-arid, interspersed with wet periods. Between 10,000 and 20,000 years ago, sea levels rose, submerging portions of the Florida peninsula and causing the water table to rise. Fresh water saturated the limestone, eroding some of it and creating springs and sinkholes. The abundance of fresh water allowed new vegetation to take root, and through evaporation formed thunderstorms. Limestone was dissolved by the slightly acidic rainwater. The limestone wore away, and groundwater came into contact with the surface, creating a massive wetland ecosystem. Although the region appears flat, the wearing away of the limestone in some areas created slight valleys and plateaus—a difference of inches in elevation—that affected the flow of water and types of vegetation present.

The Everglades are unique; no other wetland system in the world is nourished primarily from the atmosphere. Before the first attempt at draining the Everglades in 1882, the entire watershed extended from Orlando to Florida Bay comprising the Kissimmee–Lake Okeechobee–Everglades (KLOE) watershed. The Kissimmee River flows into Lake Okeechobee, which sits 18 feet (5.5 m) above sea level. Only two seasons exist in the Everglades: wet (May to November) and dry (December to April). Average annual rainfall in the Everglades is approximately 62 inches (160 cm), though fluctuations of precipitation are normal. Droughts, floods, and tropical storms are normal occurrences in the area. When Lake Okeechobee exceeds its water storage capacity during the wet season, it pours slowly over the southern rim and flows for 100 miles (160 km) to Florida Bay. The gradient change is so slight that the river moves only 2 feet (0.61 m) a minute. Sawgrass thrives in this river, dominates freshwater marshes and sloughs, and is the main characteristic of the region.

Severe weather, in the form of tropical storms and hurricanes, also affects the structure of the Everglades. Between 1871 and 2003, 40 tropical cyclones struck the Everglades, usually every one to three years. These storms alter the coastline, flush decaying vegetation from estuaries, strip weakened branches from trees, and disperse seeds, pollen, and plant material. Hurricane Donna in 1960 affected 120 square miles (310 km^{2}) of mangrove forests by depositing marl over the roots and depriving the trees of oxygen. It also eradicated orchids, bromeliads, and other epiphytes that once flourished in the mangroves; their reappearance may take a century or more. Donna also significantly spread buttonwood, saltwort, and glasswort, and epiphytes began to grow in new areas. Although the lasting effects remain to be seen, Hurricane Andrew in 1992 also destroyed mangrove forests and snapped slash pines in half. However, regrowth occurred quickly, and sand deposited by the storm surge improved nesting conditions for crocodiles and sea turtles.

=== Geology ===
A vast marshland could only have been formed due to the underlying rock formations in southern Florida. The floor of the Everglades formed between 25 million and 2 million years ago when the Florida peninsula was a shallow sea floor. The peninsula has been covered by sea water at least seven times since the earliest bedrock formation. The rock that makes up the Everglades floor was created as layers of calcium carbonate were compressed by ocean water, making limestone. Fossilized bryozoans and tiny shells, or ooids, make the limestone porous. Water is stored in the rock, sometimes from one year to the next. The length of time that a region in the Everglades remains flooded, called a hydroperiod, determines what particular soils and vegetation are present.

Shorter hydroperiods of three or four months promote the growth of periphyton: algae and other microscopic organisms covered with calcium carbonate crystals. Periphyton is the basic building block of marl, a calcitic mud. In areas with hydroperiods of longer than nine months, peat builds up over hundreds or thousands of years due to many generations of decaying plant matter. Peat and marl are considered nutrient-poor soils that foster the growth of specialized vegetation depending on the length of the regional hydroperiod.

Five types of peat appear in the Everglades system; each type supports a specific type of vegetation, such as sawgrass, tree islands, or custard apple trees. Peat buildup is possible because water prevents oxygen from quickly decomposing plant matter. Once peat buildup reaches the surface, oxygen reacts with the microorganisms to decay the peat rapidly in a process called subsidence. Initial attempts at developing agriculture near Lake Okeechobee were successful, but the nutrients in the peat quickly deteriorated by drying, and were broken down by bacteria in the soil. The dried peat burned or was degraded into carbon dioxide and water by microorganisms. Some homes built near early farms had to restructure their foundations on stilts as the peat deteriorated; other areas lost approximately 8 feet (2.4 m) of soil depth. Between the 1880s and 2005, an estimated 3.4 billion metric tons of soil has been lost in the Everglades due to oxidation. Most of that loss occurs in the Everglades Agricultural Area; the least amount of loss is found in Everglades National Park.

=== Fire ===
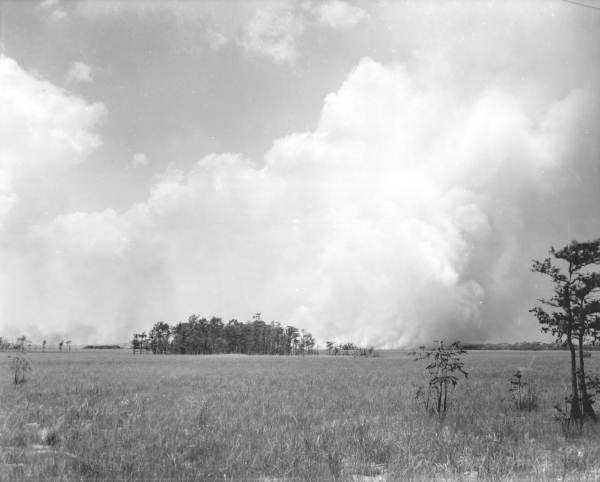
Fire near a cypress dome in the Turner River area in the early 1920s

Fire is another important element in the maintenance of the Everglades. The majority of fires are caused by lightning strikes from thunderstorms during the wet season. Their effects are largely superficial, and serve to foster further plant growth: sawgrass will burn above water, but the roots are preserved. Fire in the sawgrass marshes serves to keep out larger bushes and trees, and releases nutrients from decaying plant matter more efficiently than decomposition. Large burned areas also affect waterflow, since wind and water are unimpeded by the eradicated sawgrass; water may flow two to three times faster in recently burned areas. During the wet season only dead plant matter and the tips of plants are burned; however, the effects of fire are much more significant in the dry season, as fire may be fed by organic peat and burn deeply, destroying root systems. The only impediment to the spread of fire in the Everglades is the presence of water. It takes around 225 years for one foot (0.3 m) of peat to develop, but the peat is not as dense as it might be, given the 5,000 years of the Everglades' existence. Scientists point to fire as the reason.

Researchers have noted that fires appear in cycles associated with those of the hydroperiods. The first cycle is the annual wet-season fires that occur with rapid frequency during the summer, but are quickly extinguished. Dry-season fires are rarer due to the lack of lightning, but their damage may be more pervasive. A longer fire cycle spanning ten to fourteen years coincides with similar water cycles affected by global climate conditions. Fires in this cycle may be numerous and have little effect, or rare and have catastrophic consequences. The third cycle appears in a 550-year frequency associated with severe drought. Layers of charcoal have been detected inside peat in parts of the Everglades, indicating the region endured severe fires for years at a time, although this trend seems to have abated since the last occurrence around 940 BCE.

== Ecosystem characteristics ==
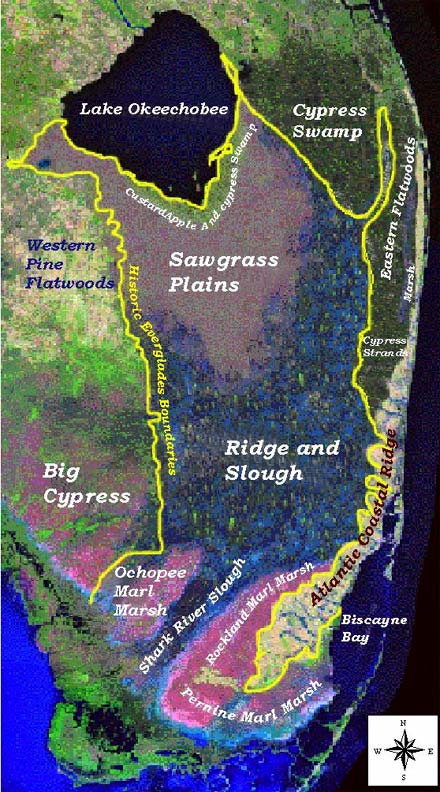
Major landscape types in the Everglades before human action. Source: U.S. Geological Survey

The Everglades are dominated by sawgrass in water; this is the titular "River of Grass" popularized by Marjory Stoneman Douglas in 1947. This river contains a wide variety of plant and animal life. Early American environmentalist Gifford Pinchot said of the Everglades, "It is a region so different that it hardly seems to belong to the United States. It is full of the most vivid and most interesting life on land, in the air, and in the water. It is a land of strangeness, separate and apart from the common things we all know so well."

The sawgrass grows in prairies or strands, in between channels of water in a shallow river 100 miles (160 km) long and 60 miles (97 km) wide flowing from Lake Okeechobee to Florida Bay. Some authors refer to the sawgrass and water combination as the "true Everglades" or just "the Glades". Prior to the first drainage attempts in 1905, the sheetflow, or the wide shallow river starting in Lake Okeechobee, occupied nearly a third of the lower Florida peninsula. Though sawgrass remains the main feature of the Everglades, other ecosystems are scattered among the marshes and prairies, and their borders are sometimes imperceptible.

=== Sawgrass marsh ===
Most marshes in the Everglades are dominated by the sedge known as Cladium, or sawgrass in common terminology. The sedge is a three-dimensional v-shaped stalk with upward-pointing teeth. Sawgrass thrives in the slowly moving water, but may die if oxygen is unable to reach its roots and is particularly vulnerable to floods immediately after a fire. Some of the sawgrass can grow up to 6 feet (1.8 m) tall, and directly south of Lake Okeechobee it has grown to 10 feet (3.0 m). Farther south, where the peat is not as rich, it typically grows 4 feet (1.2 m) tall in patches, as opposed to the prairies of the upper glades. The hydroperiod for the marsh is usually nine months but can last longer. In shorter hydroperiods, marl may form instead of peat.

Where sawgrass grows densely, few animals or other plants thrive, although alligators often choose these locations for nesting. Where there is more room, periphyton grows, appearing as mats or brown sausage-shaped chunks. Periphyton is predominantly algae, although over 100 different microorganisms help create it. Larval insects and amphibians are supported by periphyton; these in turn provide food for birds, fish, and reptiles. Periphyton also absorbs calcium from the water, which creates marl where sawgrass takes root.

=== Freshwater sloughs ===
Sloughs are channels of free-flowing water in between the sawgrass marshes. Sloughs are deeper than sawgrass marshes, about 3 feet (0.91 m), and may stay flooded for at least 11 months out of the year if not multiple years in a row. The peat beds that support sawgrass are slightly elevated and may begin abruptly creating ridges of grass. The borders between these systems are called "ridge-and-slough" landscapes. Aquatic animals such as turtles, young alligators, snakes, and fish live in sloughs and usually feed on aquatic invertebrates, such as the Florida apple snail. Plants grow here, usually submerged or floating like bladderwort (Utricularia), waterlily (Nymphaeaceae), or spatterdock (Nuphar lutea). Major sloughs in the Everglades system include the Shark River Slough draining to Florida Bay, Lostmans Slough bordering The Big Cypress, and Taylor Slough in the eastern Everglades.

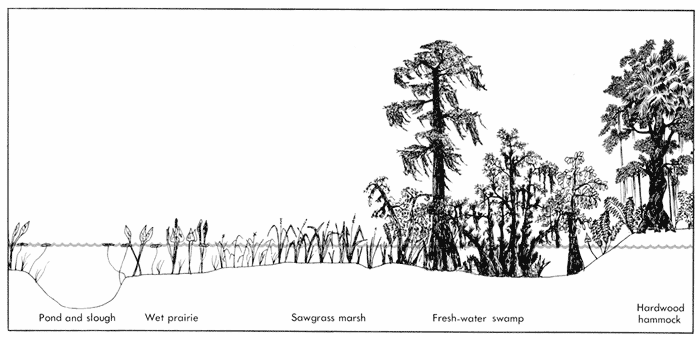
A cross section of freshwater ecosystems in the Everglades, with relative average water depths

=== Wet prairie ===
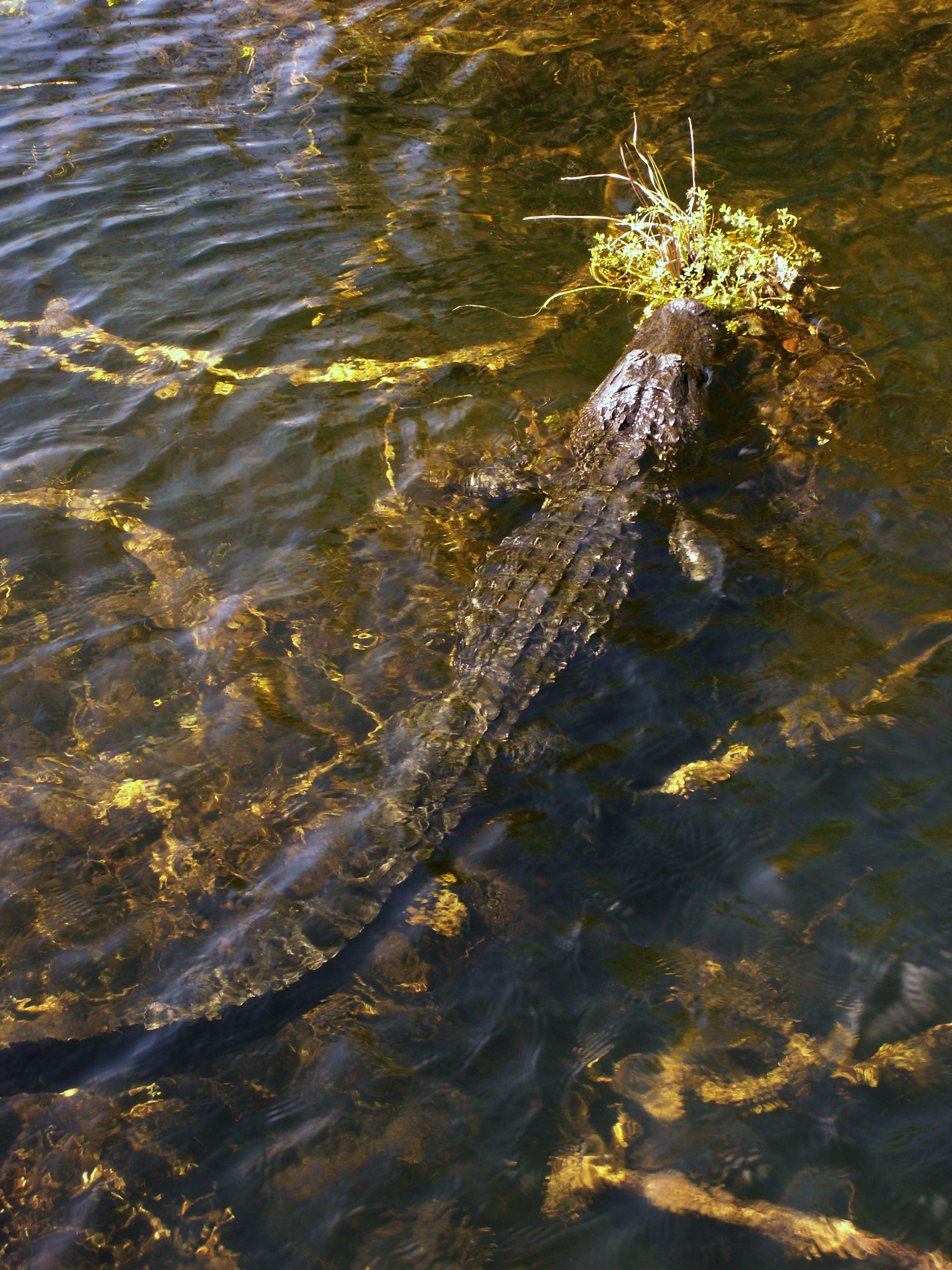
An alligator amid strands of periphyton in the Everglades

Two kinds of wet prairies thrive in the Everglades: marl and water-marsh community. Wet prairies are slightly elevated like sawgrass marshes, but contain abundant plant diversity. Marl prairies are located where marl covers limestone that may protrude as pinnacles or erode into solution holes: depressions formed by the same processes that create sinkholes. Solution holes, however, do not meet the water table; they are filled with rain water. The surface is covered only three to seven months of the year, but the water is usually just 4 inches (10 cm) deep. Marl is created by layers of periphyton loosely attached to the limestone, and forms a grey or white crumbly mud when it dries. When flooded, the marl can support a variety of water plants, and dwarf cypresses may grow for hundreds of years though not exceed 10 feet (3.0 m) in height. Solution holes may remain flooded even when the prairies are dry, and they support aquatic invertebrates such as crayfish and snails, as well as larval amphibians which feed young wading birds. Where the predominant soil is peat, a water-marsh community exists. Its hydroperiod is longer than the marl prairie, although its plants are less diverse. These regions tend to be on the border between sloughs and sawgrass marshes.

Alligators have created an ecological niche in wet prairies; they dig at low spots with their claws and snouts and create ponds free of vegetation that remain submerged throughout the dry season. Alligator holes are integral to the survival of aquatic invertebrates, turtles, fish, small mammals, and birds during extended drought periods. Alligators feed upon animals that visit the hole.

=== Pond apple forest ===
Prior to the drainage and clearance for agriculture of the northern Everglades, a 2 to 3 miles (3.2 to 4.8 km) wide forest composed predominantly of pond apple trees (locally known as custard apples) bordered the south and southeastern shore of Lake Okeechobee. Beyond the pond apple forest was a zone of willow and elderberry. The lake would overflow its southern edge periodically, flooding the pond apple forest, with water eventually passing though to the sawgrass zone that made up most of the northern Everglades. Pond apple forests and isolated trees also occur where the water remains relatively deep for most of the year.

=== Tropical hardwood hammock ===
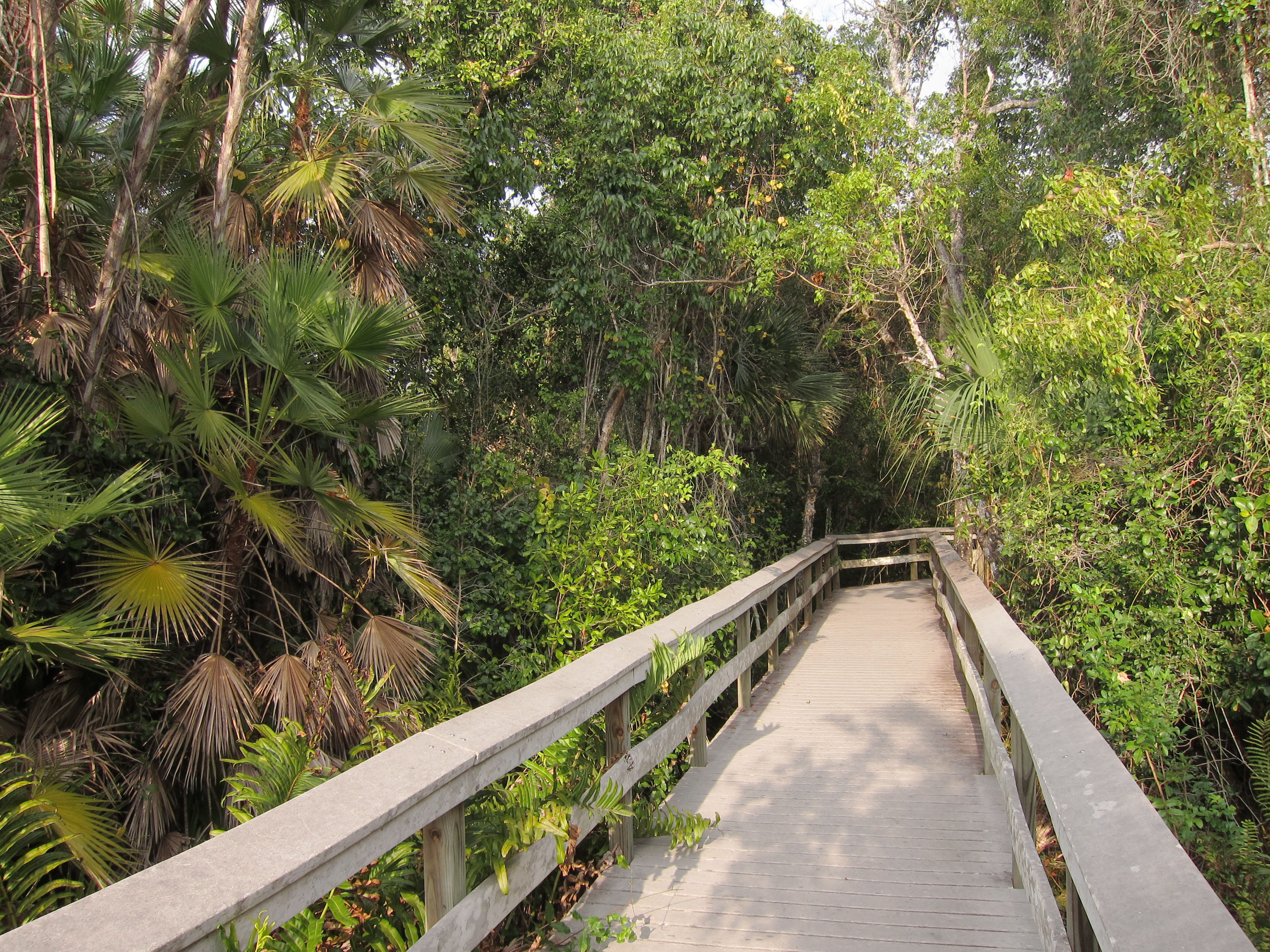
In a tropical hardwood hammock, plants are very dense and diverse.

Islands of trees featuring dense temperate or tropical trees are called tropical hardwood hammocks. They may rise between 1 and 3 feet (0.30 and 0.91 m) above water level in freshwater sloughs, sawgrass prairies, or pineland. These islands illustrate the difficulty of characterizing the climate of the Everglades as tropical or subtropical. Hammocks in the northern portion of the Everglades consist of more temperate plant species, but closer to Florida Bay the trees are tropical and smaller shrubs are more prevalent. Tropical trees like the West Indian mahogany (Swietenia mahagoni) were probably spread by birds carrying seeds from the West Indies.

These hammocks form on slightly elevated areas unharmed by deep peat fires or limestone plateaus rising several inches above the surrounding peat. Hardwood hammocks exhibit a mixture of subtropical and hardwood trees that grow in very dense clumps, such as southern live oak (Quercus virginiana), gumbo limbo (Bursera simaruba), royal palm (Roystonea regia), Florida poisonwood (Metopium toxiferum), and willow bustic (Dipholis salicifolia). Near the bases of hammocks sharp saw palmettos (Serenoa repens) flourish, making the hammocks very difficult to penetrate. Water in sloughs flow around the islands creating moats. Though some ecosystems are maintained and promoted by fire, hammocks may take decades or centuries to recover; the moats are therefore essential for protection. Islands vary in size, but most range between 1 and 10 acres (0.40 and 4.05 ha); the water slowly flowing around them limits their size and gives them a teardrop appearance from above. The height of the trees is limited by factors such as frost, lightning, and wind: the majority of trees in hammocks grow no higher than 55 feet (17 m).

Florida strangler figs (Ficus aurea) are common in hammocks, and find particular ease in rooting at the heads of cabbage palms (Sabal palmetto). After taking root into the ground, they build complex frameworks around the host tree, eventually squeezing out light and nutrients, and essentially taking its place. A variety of invertebrates including beetles, ants, spiders, and tree snails support a food chain that includes frogs, owls and other birds of prey, snakes, rodents, bobcats, and raccoons. There are more than 50 varieties of tree snails in the Everglades; the color patterns and designs unique to single islands may be a result of the isolation of certain hammocks.

Tropical hardwood hammocks in the Everglades have been harvested for lumber, particularly by shipbuilders seeking West Indian mahogany and black ironwood (Krugiodendron ferreum). The largest and most mature of these trees had been removed by the late 18th century. Seminoles made their villages in hammocks in the late 19th and early 20th centuries; they lived in groups of chickees numbering half a dozen, with one central chickee for cooking and another for eating. Dugout canoes, cookware, stills, and sewing machines may still be found in remote locations.

==== Bayheads and willowheads ====
Some hammocks are dominated by types of vegetation that grow in relation to the amount of water or type of soil present. The majority of hardwood hammocks create a thin poor soil covering the limestone called humus, made of decaying plant matter and moisture trapped by the structure of the trees. When peat forms the layer atop the limestone of a tree island, bayheads develop, dominated by bay trees such as sweetbay magnolia (Magnolia virginiana) and others like swamp holly (Ilex decidua), wax myrtle (Myrica cerifera), and cocoplum (Chrysobalanus icaco). Willowheads, dominated by willow trees (Salix caroliniana), take hold where the hydroperiod is long, usually around solution or alligator holes, and may surround the holes, giving them a donut appearance from above.

== Flatwoods and the Atlantic Coastal Ridge ==
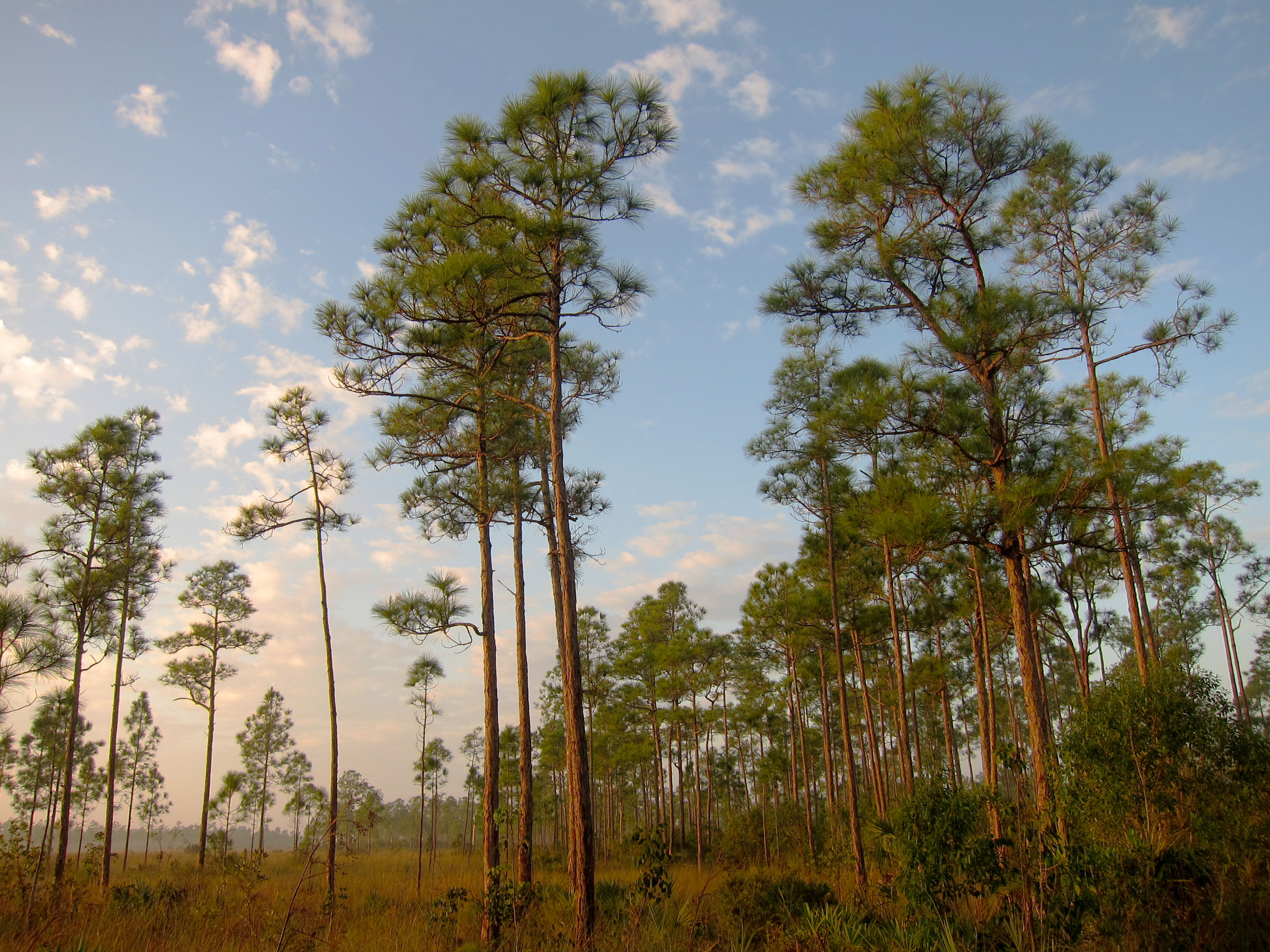
The pine rockland ecosystem is dominated by South Florida slash pines and shrubs like saw palmettos.

The prairies and sloughs of the Everglades system are bordered by two areas of poorly drained sandy soil on both sides of Lake Okeechobee: the Eastern Flatwoods and the Western Flatwoods just north of Big Cypress Swamp. The predominant ecosystem in the Flatwoods is pine forest, but there are also cypress swamps and sloughs in the Eastern Flatwoods. Along the eastern border of the Everglades is the Atlantic Coastal Ridge, rising 20 feet (6.1 m) in elevation, and curving to the southwest, gradually decreasing in elevation until it meets Taylor Slough. The Coastal Ridge prevents Everglades water from flowing into the Atlantic Ocean to the east, directing it southwesterly into Florida Bay. The South Florida metropolitan area is located on a portion of the Atlantic Coastal Ridge, and much of the landscape has changed drastically within the past 100 years as a result of urban growth.

=== Pine rockland ===
Pine rocklands (also called pinelands) are found on uneven limestone substrates that contain pinnacles and solution holes. There are three primary locations of pine rocklands: the Miami Ridge, which runs from Miami into Long Pine Key near the main entrance of Everglades National Park; the lower Florida Keys; and the Big Cypress Swamp. The most significant feature of the pine rockland ecosystem is the South Florida slash pine (Pinus elliotti var densa; also called Dade County pine) that reaches a height of 22 feet (6.7 m). Pine rockland communities require fire for maintenance; they have adapted to promote and resist fire at the same time. These communities are located in the highest part of the Everglades with little to no hydroperiod, although some floors may have flooded solution holes or puddles for a few months at a time. The sandy floor of the pine rocklands is covered with dry pine needles that are highly flammable. South Florida slash pines are insulated by their bark to protect them from heat. Fire eliminates competing vegetation on the forest floor, and opens pine cones to germinate seeds. A period without significant fire can turn pineland into hardwood hammock as larger trees overtake the slash pines. The understory shrubs in pine rocklands include fire-resistant species like saw palmetto (Serenoa repens), cabbage palm (Sabal palmetto), and West Indian lilac (Tetrazygia bicolor). The most diverse group of plants in the pine community are herbs, of which two dozen species exist. These plants contain tubers and other mechanisms allowing for quick sprouts after charring.

Wildlife in pine rockland communities is diverse. In some forests, 15 species of birds can be found. Common among them are the pine warbler (Dendroica pinus), the red-bellied woodpecker (Melanerpes carolinus), and the eastern meadowlark (Sturnella magna). More than 20 species of reptiles and amphibians have been noted, such as the green anole (Anolis carolinensis), southern leopard frog (Rana sphenocephala), and southern black racer (Coluber constrictor priapus). Mammals such as the critically endangered Florida panther (Puma concolor coryi), Florida black bear (Ursus americanus floridanus), and several types of bats also live in the pine rocklands.

Before urban development of the South Florida region, pine rocklands covered around 161,660 acres (654.2 km^{2}) in Miami-Dade County. Pine forests were extensively cleared by urban developers and the lumber industry in the 1930s and 1940s. Within Everglades National Park, 19,840 acres (80.3 km^{2}) of pine rockland communities are protected, but outside the park, 1,780 acres (7.2 km^{2}) of pine forests remain as of 1990, averaging 12.1 acres (0.049 km^{2}) in size. Dade County pine has a remarkable longevity and has proven to be termite-resistant, although dense enough to make driving nails difficult. In 1984 they were protected by a county ordinance, after many pine areas had been depleted. A misunderstanding of fire's role also played a part in the disappearance of pine forests, as natural fires were put out and pine rocklands transitioned into hardwood hammocks. Today prescribed fires are set in Everglades National Park in pine rocklands every three to seven years.

== The Big Cypress ==
West of the sawgrass prairies and sloughs lies the Big Cypress Swamp, commonly called "The Big Cypress", referring to its size rather than the height or diameter of its trees. It takes up the majority of Collier County; at its most limited measurement, the swamp measures 1,200 square miles (3,100 km^{2}), but its hydrological boundary is nearly twice as large. The Big Cypress is slightly elevated at 22 feet (6.7 m) at its highest point and slopes gradually to the coastline for approximately 35 miles (56 km). Because the defining feature of The Big Cypress is the abundance of trees it is considered a swamp, rather than a marsh where grass is the main characteristic.

The basin for The Big Cypress receives on average 55 inches (140 cm) of water in the rainy season. Most of The Big Cypress sits atop a bedrock covered by a thin layer of limestone that contains quartz, creating a sandy soil that hosts a variety of vegetation. The majority of trees are bald cypress (Taxodium distichum) and pond cypress (Taxodium ascendens). Cypresses are conifers that are uniquely adapted to thrive in flooded conditions, with buttressed trunks and root projections that protrude out of the water, called "knees".

Cypress trees in the area can live for hundreds of years; some giants grow to 130 feet (40 m) and are 500 years old. Still, they may be only seventh- or eighth-generation cypresses. Few massive trees survived the logging operations that took place in the 1930s and 1940s. As a result, much of The Big Cypress is protected by various federal or state agencies in preserves that include Big Cypress National Preserve, Corkscrew Swamp Sanctuary, Fakahatchee Strand State Preserve and two Indian reservations.

=== Cypress head ===
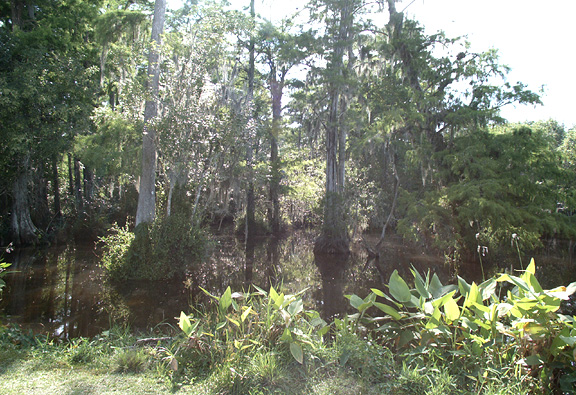
A pond in The Big Cypress

Although The Big Cypress is the largest growth of cypress swamps in South Florida, such swamps—as well as portions of sawgrass marshes—can be found near the Atlantic Coastal Ridge and between Lake Okeechobee and the Eastern flatwoods. Hardwood hammocks and pineland are often interspersed with the cypress ecosystem. Much like tree islands that are colloquially referred to as "heads", cypress trees grow in formations that resemble domes, with the tallest and thickest trunks in the center, rooted in the deepest peat. Toward the edges, where the peat is thinner, cypresses grow, but are smaller and thinner, giving the small forest the appearance of a dome. They also grow in strands, slightly elevated on a plateau of limestone and surrounded on two sides by sloughs. Other hardwood trees can be found in cypress domes, such as red maple (Acer rubrum), swamp bay (Persea palustris), and pop ash (Fraxinus caroliniana). If cypresses are removed, hardwoods take over, and the ecosystem is recategorized as a mixed swamp forest.

Because the cypress domes and strands retain moisture and block out much of the sunlight, plants such as orchids, bromeliads, and ferns thrive in cypress domes and strands. Orchids bloom throughout the year in cypress heads, and bromeliads appear in many varieties; on Fakahatchee Strand alone, thirteen species have been documented. Bromeliads collect moisture from rain and humidity in the bases of their leaves, which also nurture frogs, lizards and various insects. Wood storks (Mycteria americana) nest almost exclusively in cypress forests and in the past 100 years have seen a dramatic decline, probably due to lack of reproduction tied to controlled water. Wood storks' reproductive cycles coincide with the dry season, when small fish and amphibians are trapped in shallow pools and puddles. When water from canals or locks is released too soon or not at all, storks are unable to find enough food for themselves and their offspring. An estimated 20,000 wood storks nested in The Big Cypress in the 1930s, but by the 1990s less than 2,000 were counted.

== Mangroves and coastal prairie ==
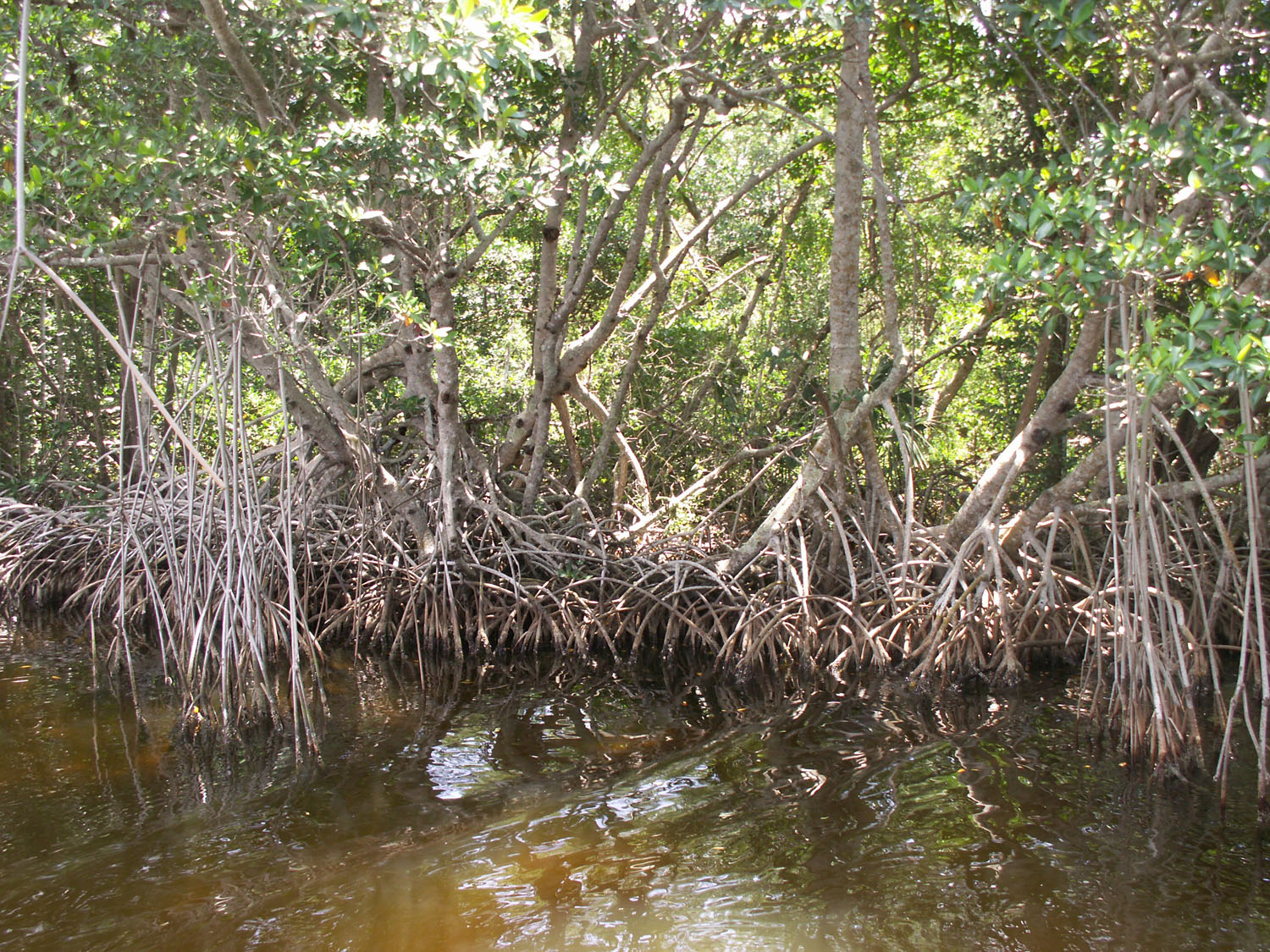
Red mangrove trees bordering a canal in the Everglades near Flamingo

Water from Lake Okeechobee and The Big Cypress eventually flows to the ocean. At a transitional zone where fresh water meets salt water, mangrove trees thrive, adapted as they are to both kinds of water. This brackish mixture of water and mangrove systems, crisscrossed by hundreds of tidal creeks, harbors a very productive ecosystem. The depth of these zones is dependent on how much water flows from the Everglades. In the wet season, fresh water pours into Florida Bay and sawgrass appears near the coastline. In dryer years, salt water creeps inland to the coastal prairie, an ecosystem that buffers the freshwater marshes by absorbing sea water. Mangrove trees grow in freshwater ecosystems when the salt water flows far enough inland. The Everglades have the most extensive contiguous system of mangroves in the world. The mangrove forests of the Ten Thousand Islands cover almost 200,000 acres (810 km^{2}).

=== Mangroves ===
Three species of mangrove trees exist in the region: red (Rhizophora mangle), black (Avicennia germinans), and white (Laguncularia racemosa), although all are from different families. All have the same characteristics: they are tolerant of salt, brackish, and fresh water; they grow in oxygen-poor soil; and they can survive drastic water-level changes. Black and white mangroves excrete salt from under their leaves, and red mangroves filter the salinity of sea water. All species are integral to coastline protection during severe storms. Red mangroves, for example, have far-reaching roots that trap sediments. The trees not only stabilize coastlines, but add land as more sand and decaying vegetation is trapped in the root systems. All three mangroves also absorb the energy of waves and storm surges.

The estuaries act as fisheries for fry and nurseries for crustaceans. Shrimp, oysters, crabs, whelks, cockles, and snails thrive in these waters, as do primordial horseshoe crabs (Limulus polyphemus). Oysters and mangroves work in tandem to build up the coastline. The sand around the coastline has minute white particles of quartz and fine shells. When currents are right, oysters grow in colonies or beds, and deposit their shells, reinforcing the bed. Mangrove seeds, called propagules, are full embryos and float in water until they reach a favorable location and take root, often on oyster beds. They shed skin and litter, ensuring other trees will not compete for space and nutrients.

Mangroves also serve as excellent rookeries for birds. Wading birds, such as roseate spoonbills (Platalea ajaja), egrets, and tricolored herons (Egretta tricolor) use the mangroves as a nursery, due to the proximity of food sources and the protection offered from most prey. Thousands of birds can nest in the mangroves at once, making a noisy and messy colony, but their droppings fertilize the mangrove trees. Shorebirds like rails, terns and gulls; diving birds such as pelicans and grebes; and birds of prey such as ospreys, hawks and vultures are among the more than 100 species of birds that use Everglades mangrove trees to raise their young.

== Florida Bay ==
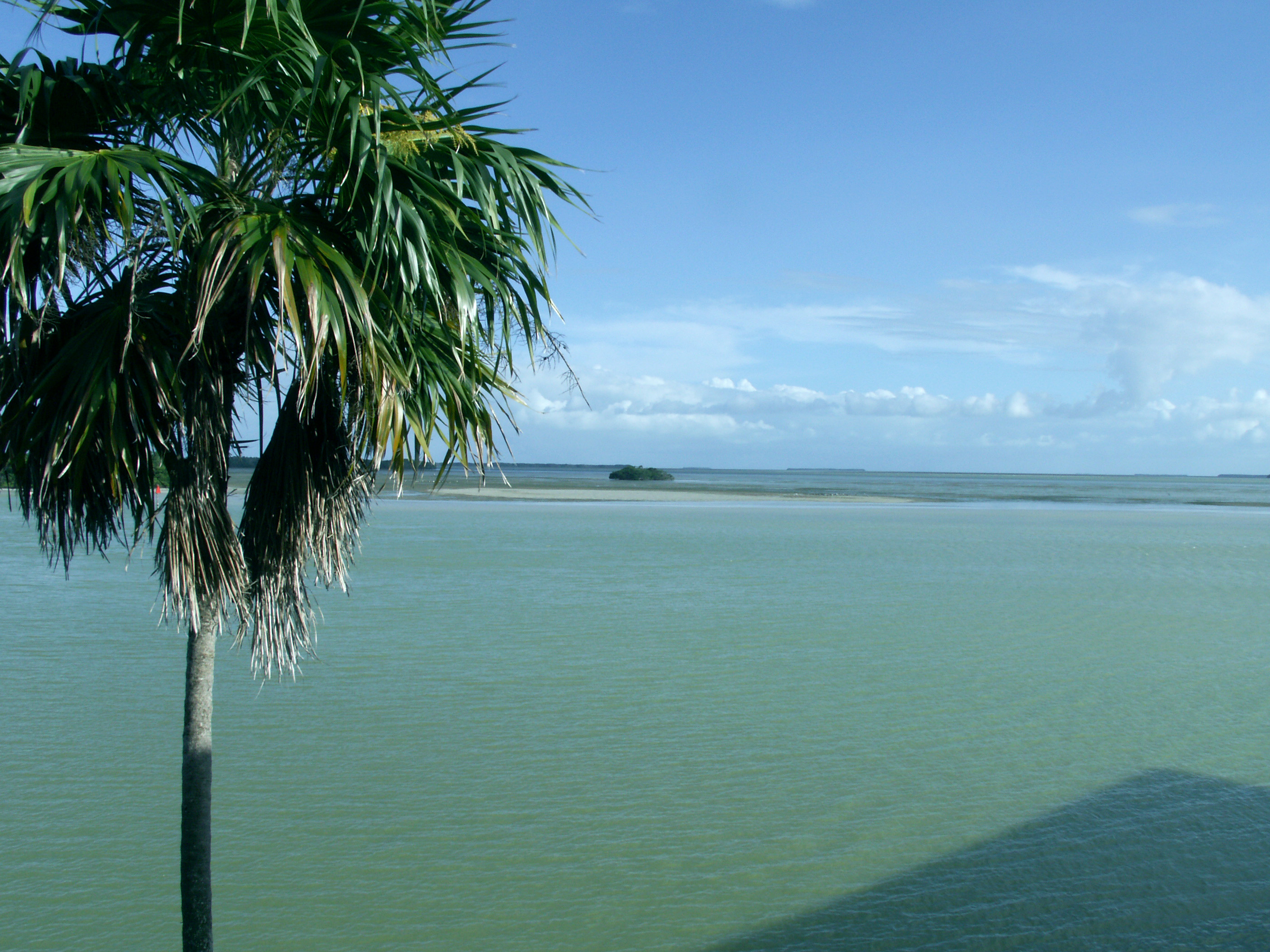
A clump of mangroves in the distance, Florida Bay at Flamingo

Because much of the coast and inner estuaries are built by mangroves—and there is no border between the coastal marshes and the bay—the ecosystems in Florida Bay are considered part of the Everglades. More than 800 square miles (2,100 km^{2}) of Florida Bay is protected by Everglades National Park, representing the largest body of water in the park boundaries. Larger islands may be taken over by hardwood hammocks. The outer rims of the Ten Thousand Islands and Cape Sable share characteristics of the intertwining saltwater bays and fresh water marshes. There are approximately one hundred keys in Florida Bay, many of which are mangrove forests.

The fresh water entering Florida Bay from the Everglades creates ideal conditions for vast beds of turtle grass and algae formations that foster animal life in the bay. Sea turtles and manatees (Trichechus manatus latirostris) eat the grass, while invertebrates such as worms, clams, and other mollusks consume algae formations and microscopic plankton. Female sea turtles return annually to nest on the shore, and manatees spend the winter months in the warmer water of the bay. The Calusa Indians had various uses for shells of marine invertebrates, due to the lack of dense rock with which to make tools. They used the horse conch (Triplofusus papillosus), left-handed whelk (Sinistrofulgur), and the Florida crown conch (Melongena corona) as drinking vessels, picks, hammers, knives and awls.

Sea grasses stabilize sea beds and protect shorelines from erosion by absorbing energy from waves. Shrimp, spiny lobsters, and sea urchins live in and among the grasses and feed on phytoplankton; they in turn feed larger predators such as sharks, rays, barracuda, and king mackerel (Scomberomorus cavalla). Due to shallow water and abundant sunlight, Florida Bay hosts communities of coral reefs and sponges, although the majority of the state's reefs are closer to the Florida Keys. Everglades keys that foster mangroves also support nurseries for wading birds such as the great blue heron (Ardea herodias), which was almost wiped out in the Labor Day Hurricane of 1935 (only 146 were counted afterward). After recovering to number more than 2,000, they were further endangered by Hurricane Donna in 1960, which decreased their numbers by 35 to 40 percent.

Sea floor patterns of Florida Bay are formed by currents and winds. However, since 1932, sea levels have been rising at a rate of 1 foot (0.30 m) per 100 years. Though mangroves serve to build and stabilize the coastline, seas may be rising more rapidly than the trees are able to build.

== Biodiversity ==
Ecosystems in the Everglades have been described as both fragile and resilient. Author Michael Grunwald wrote about the observations of the Everglades' first American visitors: "If the Grand Canyon was a breathtaking painting, the Everglades was a complex drama, and everything in it had a role." An estimated 11,000 species of seed-bearing plants and 400 species of land or water vertebrates live in the Everglades, but slight variations in water levels affect many organisms and reshape land formations. The health and productivity of any ecosystem relies on the number of species present: the loss of one species weakens the entire ecosystem.

For example, Florida apple snails (Pomacea paludosa) are an amphibious freshwater mollusk. They have a single gill and lung, and live on stalks of sawgrass in water depths no more than 20 inches (51 cm). They are the primary food of the endangered snail kite (Rostrhamus sociabilis) and limpkin (Aramus guarauna) as well as the raccoon, otter, and young alligator. Apple snails lay their eggs on sawgrass stalks about 6 inches (15 cm) above the water line, and they are intolerant of being submerged for long periods of time. When the eggs hatch, young snails must enter the water quickly or face death. When water levels are too low or rise too quickly while snail eggs are developing, apple snails do not flourish, affecting the many reptiles, mammals, and birds that feed on them. With regard to the ecology of trophic dynamics, or food chains, the 174 species of invertebrates play a vital role in the Everglades. Crayfish, insects, scorpions, and other invertebrates also support a web of animals.

The group of animals most integral to the overall success of Everglades wildlife is freshwater fish. Few places in the Everglades stay submerged from one year to the next, so alligator holes and deep clefts in the limestone are vital to the survival of fish, and the animal community as a whole. Freshwater fish are the main diet of most wading birds, alligators, and otters, and require large areas of open water in order to repopulate. Young amphibians also play an important role in the food chain. Tadpoles spread quickly in isolated areas where fish do not have the time or access to reproduce in numbers necessary to support larger animals. Hundreds of species of amphibians are found in the Everglades, and their availability helps support wildlife during short hydroperiods or in remote locations.

These smaller animals support communities of larger animals, including 70 species of land birds that breed within the Everglades, and 120 water birds, of which 43 breed in the area. Many of these birds go on to migrate through the West Indies and North America. Several dozen species of mammals also thrive in the region, from tiny bats and shrews to midsize raccoons (Procyon lotor), otters (Lontra canadensis), opossums (Didelphis virginiana), and foxes. The largest include white tailed deer (Odocoileus virginianus), the Florida black bear, and the Florida panther.

Although slight changes in water level affect many species, the system as a whole also cycles and pulses with each change. Some transformations to the diversity of plant and animal life are natural, caused by fire or storms, and some are induced by humans, such as urban encroachment, the introduction of exotic species, and rapid global warming. Environmental conditions in the Everglades favor no particular species. Some species, such as snail kites and apple snails, do well in wet conditions, but wood storks and Cape Sable seaside sparrows (Ammodramus maritimus mirabilis) do well in dryer circumstances.

== Human impact ==
People have lived in the Everglades region for thousands of years. Within the past century, however, they have changed the natural landscape dramatically. Settlement of urban areas in South Florida was facilitated by large drainage projects intended to create more land. The drainage was often implemented without a full understanding of the intricacies of ecosystems and shaping processes of the Everglades. The South Florida metropolitan area grew exponentially, causing problems in ecosystems throughout the Everglades. Numerous invasive species were introduced through various means, which prey on and compete with native species. By the 1990s, the diminishing quality of life in many of these urban areas was linked to the degraded local environment. The State of Florida and the U.S. government devised and passed a plan in 2000, named the Comprehensive Everglades Restoration Plan, to restore as much of the Everglades to pre-drainage conditions as possible. It is the costliest and most comprehensive environmental restoration project in history.

== See also ==
- Indigenous people of the Everglades region
- Comprehensive Everglades Restoration Plan

== Bibliography ==
- Douglas, Marjory (1947). The Everglades: River of Grass. R. Bemis Publishing, Ltd. ISBN 0-912451-44-0
- George, Jean (1972). Everglades Wildguide. National Park Service. Gov. doc #I 29.62:Ev2
- Griffin, John (2002). Archeology of the Everglades. University Press of Florida. ISBN 0-8130-2558-3
- Grunwald, Michael (2006). The Swamp: The Everglades, Florida, and the Politics of Paradise, Simon & Schuster. ISBN 0-7432-5107-5
- Jewell, Susan (1993). Exploring Wild South Florida: A Guide to Finding the Natural Areas and Wildlife of the Everglades and Florida Keys, Pineapple Press, Inc. ISBN 1-56164-023-9
- Lodge, Thomas E. (1994). The Everglades Handbook: Understanding the Ecosystem. CRC Press. ISBN 1-56670-614-9
- McCally, David (1999). The Everglades: An Environmental History. University Press of Florida. ISBN 0-8130-2302-5
- Ripple, Jeff (1992). Big Cypress Swamp and the Ten Thousand Islands: Eastern America's Last Great Wilderness, University of South Carolina Press. ISBN 0-87249-842-5
- South Florida Water Management District (2010). Chapter 6: Ecology of the Everglades Protection Area. 2010 South Florida Environmental Report: Volume I—The South Florida Environment. Retrieved on May 26, 2010.
- Toops, Connie (1998). The Florida Everglades. Voyageur Press. ISBN 0-89658-372-4
- Whitney, Ellie et al., eds. (2004) Priceless Florida: Natural Ecosystems and Native Species. Pineapple Press, Inc. ISBN 978-1-56164-309-7
- Williams, John (2002). Florida hurricanes and tropical storms, 1871–2001. University of Florida Press. ISBN 0-8130-2494-3
