= C-44 Reservoir and Stormwater Treatment Area =

Waterways project in Florida, US

Coordinates: 27.0945°N 80.4474°W

The C-44 Reservoir and Stormwater Treatment Area is the first component of the Indian River Lagoon-South (IRL-S) project, part of the Comprehensive Everglades Restoration Plan (CERP), a joint effort between the U.S. Army Corps of Engineers Jacksonville District and the local sponsor, the South Florida Water Management District.
