= Comprehensive Everglades Restoration Plan =

Restoration of the Everglades ecosystem in southern Florida

The Comprehensive Everglades Restoration Plan (CERP) is the plan enacted by the U.S. Congress for the restoration of the Everglades ecosystem in south Florida.

When originally authorized by the U.S. Congress through the Water Resources Act of 2000, it was estimated that CERP would cost a total of $8.2 billion and take approximately 30 years to complete. More recent estimates (2026) indicate that the plan would take approximately 50 years to implement, and would cost approximately $44 billion more than originally thought, plus additional adjustments for inflation.

== Overview ==
CERP provides a framework and guide to restore, protect, and preserve the water resources of central and south Florida, including the Everglades. It covers 16 counties over an 18,000-square-mile (47,000 km^{2}) area and centers on an update of the Central and Southern Florida (C&SF) Project. The State of Florida—through the South Florida Water Management District—and the U.S. Army Corps of Engineers are undertaking various projects under CERP to help ensure the proper quantity, quality, timing, and distribution of waters to the Everglades and all of South Florida.

The goal of CERP is to recapture the fresh water that is currently pumped out to the Atlantic Ocean and the Gulf of Mexico in order to reduce water levels in Lake Okeechobee and redirect it south to the Everglades National Park that has been receiving greatly reduced inflows since the 20th century drainage of the landscape.

The majority of the water will be devoted to environmental restoration, reviving the degrading Everglades terrestrial, wetland and marine ecosystems. The remaining water will benefit cities and farmers by enhancing water supplies for the South Florida economy.

== Historical ==
The Central and Southern Florida (C&SF) Project, which was first authorized by the U.S. Congress in 1948, is a multi-purpose project that provides flood control, water supply for municipal, industrial, and agricultural uses, prevention of saltwater intrusion, water supply for Everglades National Park, and protection of fish and wildlife resources. The primary system includes about 1,000 miles (1,600 km) of levees, 720 miles (1,160 km) of canals, and almost 200 water control structures. The C&SF Project has performed its authorized functions well; however, the project has had unintended adverse effects on the unique and diverse environment that constitutes south Florida ecosystems, including the Everglades and Florida Bay.

== Legal ==
The Plan was enacted into law by the U.S. Congress in the Water Resources Development Act (WRDA) of 2000. It includes more than 60 elements, will take more than 30 years to construct, and was originally estimated to cost $7.8 billion.

Numerous lawsuits affecting Everglades restoration are pending before the courts.

== Water storage ==
CERP called for 18 above ground reservoirs for water storage, totaling 180,000 acres. Of these, 60,000 acres of water storage was called for in the Everglades Agricultural Area.

== U.S. National Research Council reviews ==
A series of biennial reports from the U.S. National Research Council have reviewed the progress of CERP. The fourth report in the series, released in 2012, found that little progress has been made in restoring the core of the remaining Everglades ecosystem; instead, most project construction so far has occurred along its periphery. The report noted that to reverse ongoing ecosystem declines, it will be necessary to expedite restoration projects that target the central Everglades and to improve both the quality and quantity of the water in the ecosystem.

To better understand the potential implications of the current slow pace of progress, the report assessed the current status of ten Everglades ecosystem attributes, including phosphorus loads, peat depth, and populations of snail kites, a species of bird of prey that are endangered in South Florida. Most attributes received grades ranging from C (degraded) to D (significantly degraded), but the snail kite received a grade of F (near irreversible damage). The report also assessed the future trajectory of each ecosystem attribute under three restoration scenarios: improved water quality, improved hydrology, and improvements to both water quality and hydrology, which helped highlight the urgency of restoration actions to benefit a wide range of ecosystem attributes and demonstrate the cost of inaction.

Overall, the report concluded that substantial near-term progress to address both water quality and hydrology in the central Everglades is needed to reverse ongoing degradation before it’s too late.

== See also ==
- C-44 Reservoir and Stormwater Treatment Area
- Everglades Forever Act
- Environmental issues in Florida
- Environmental law in the United States
- Environment of Florida
- Freshwater ecosystem
