= Water Resources Development Act of 2000 =

US water resources act

The Water Resources Development Act of 2000 (WRDA 2000), Pub. L. 106–541 (text) (PDF), was enacted by Congress of the United States on December 11, 2000. Most of the provisions of WRDA 2000 are administered by the United States Army Corps of Engineers.

== Title I: Water Resources Projects ==
Authorizes projects for water resources development, conservation, and related purposes at specified water resources projects in Alaska, Arizona, California, the Delaware coast, Florida, Hawaii, Indiana and Kentucky, Kentucky and Ohio, the Ohio River in Kentucky, Illinois, Indiana, Ohio, Pennsylvania, and West Virginia, Louisiana to the Gulf of Mexico, Missouri, Nebraska, New Jersey, New York, North Carolina, Tennessee, Washington, and Wyoming.

Directs a study of, and if feasible, projects for:

- emergency streambank protection in Indiana and Louisiana;
- navigation in Alaska, Florida, Louisiana, Minnesota, New York, and Wisconsin;
- aquatic ecosystem restoration in Colorado, Florida, Illinois, Louisiana, Michigan, Nebraska, New Hampshire, New York, Ohio, Oregon, and Pennsylvania;
- shoreline protection in Louisiana and New York;
- snagging and sediment removal in Illinois and Louisiana; and
- mitigation of shore damage in Washington.

Authorizes certain projects in Louisiana, Minnesota, and Ohio for the beneficial uses of dredged material.

Amends the Water Resources Development Act of 1999 to authorize a shore protection project in Washington.

Authorizes a flood protection project in California.

== Title II: General Provisions ==
Amends the Water Resources Development Act of 1986

- to assess the water resources needs of watersheds (currently only river basins and regions) of the United States.
- to require cost-sharing agreements for environmental protection and restoration, navigation, storm damage or hurricane protection, shoreline erosion, or recreation projects under such Act (currently, only for flood control or agricultural water supply) to be subject to the non-Federal interest's ability to pay.
- to require certain guidelines developed therein to address measures undertaken by non- Federal interests to preserve a project's flood protection level.
- to require enhanced public participation in the development of each project feasibility study under that Act, including the use of a stakeholder advisory group.
- to direct mitigation projects to reflect contemporary understanding of the science of such mitigation.

Authorizes studying the feasibility of water resources development projects that will substantially benefit Indian tribes; and are located primarily within Indian country or in proximity to Alaska Native villages.

Authorizes a program to reduce vandalism and destruction of property at water resources development projects, including awards to those providing information.

Authorizes participation in the National Recreation Reservation Service and pay the Army's share of activities required to maintain such Service.

Amends Water Resources Development Act of 1996 to adjust and extend permanently the authorization of appropriations for interagency and international support to address problems of national significance to the United States.

Authorizes areas at Army civil works projects for the reburial of certain Native American remains discovered on project lands.

Amends various WRDA Acts to allow a non-Federal sponsor to include a nonprofit entity, with the consent of the affected local government, in projects for environmental dredging, the lakes program, and environmental improvement.

Authorizes the Corps of Engineers to provide specialized or technical services to a Federal agency (other than an agency of the Department of Defense) only if the chief executive of the requesting entity submits a request describing the scope of such services, an agreement to reimburse the Corps for their costs; and a certification that such services are not reasonably and quickly available through ordinary business channels.

Authorizes various funding and cooperative agreement mechanisms with various entities, both Federal and non-Federal.

Directs a program to allow the direct marketing of dredged materials to public agencies and private entities.

Directs a contract with the National Academy of Sciences to study, and make recommendations relating to, the independent peer review of water resources project feasibility reports, including a review of methods for project analysis.

Amends the Water Resources Development Act of 1990

- to extend through FY 2005 the authorization of appropriations for the rehabilitation of Federal flood control levees.
- to increase and extend through FY 2005 the authorization of appropriations for Great Lakes remedial action plans and sediment remediation.

Amends the Flood Control Act of 1948 to increase from $40,000 to $50,000 the maximum expenditure for small flood control projects.

Authorizes a pilot program to test the design-build method of project delivery on various authorized Corps civil works projects.

Amends the Water Resources Development Act of 1999 to add sites in Iowa, Minnesota, New York, Pennsylvania, and Texas to authorized flood mitigation and riverine restoration projects.

== Title III: Project-Related Provisions ==
Modifies the Tennessee-Tombigbee Waterway wildlife mitigation project, Alabama and Mississippi, to authorize removal of the wildlife mitigation purpose designation from up to 3,000 acres (12 km^{2}) of such project's land, and to take related actions.

Modifies funding ratios and agreements on the following projects:

- flood control project in Nogales, Arizona
- navigation project in the Sacramento Deep Water Ship Channel, California
- navigation on the Delaware River, Delaware, New Jersey, and Pennsylvania,
- storm damage reduction and shoreline protection, Rehoboth and Dewey Beach, Delaware,
- shore protection, Gasparilla and Estero Island, Florida
- the Upper Des Plaines River and tributaries, Illinois and Wisconsin.
- dredging project at Poplar Island, Maryland
- the project for navigation, Pemiscot County Harbor, Missouri.
- the project for flood control, Duck Creek, Ohio
- the Fox Point hurricane barrier in Providence, Rhode Island (by amending the WRDA 1999)
- the flood control project, Levisa and Tug Forks of the Big Sandy River and Upper Cumberland River, Virginia
- Chesapeake Bay oyster restoration in Maryland and Virginia (by amending WRDA 1986)

Modifies the following projects

- navigation, Fernandina Harbor, Florida, to authorize the Secretary to realign the access channel
- flood protection, East St. Louis and vicinity, Illinois, to include ecosystem restoration
- navigation, Kaskaskia River, Illinois, to include recreation
- navigation, Waukegan Harbor, Illinois, to extend such project's upstream limit.
- flood control and power generation project, White River Basin, Arkansas and Missouri, to provide minimum flows necessary to sustain tail water trout fisheries.
- a visitors center and other recreational features at the flood control project, Atchafalaya Basin Floodway System, Louisiana.
- mitigation of fish and wildlife losses project, Red River Waterway, Louisiana, to authorize the purchase of additional mitigation lands
- navigation project, Georges River, Maine, to redesignate a specified project portion
- navigation project, Duluth Harbor, Minnesota, to include the relocation of Scenic Highway 61
- clearing, snagging, and sediment removal, East Bank of the Mississippi River, Little Falls, Minnesota
- project for flood control, Passaic River, New Jersey and New York, to give priority to nonstructural approaches to flood control as alternatives to construction of the Passaic River tunnel element. Establishes the Passaic River Flood Management Task Force
- the project for environmental quality, Times Beach Nature Preserve, Buffalo, New York, to include recreation
- the project for shoreline protection, Rockaway Inlet to Norton Point, New York, to authorize T-groins to improve sand retention.
- the project for flood control, Nonconnah Creek, Tennessee and Mississippi, to authorize a protected area and hiking and biking trails
- the flood control project, San Antonio channel, Texas, to include environmental restoration and recreation
- the project for beach erosion control and hurricane protection, Sandbridge Beach, Virginia, to provide 50 years of periodic nourishment
- sediment control project, Mount St. Helens, Washington, to maintain specified flood protection levels

Directs construction of an authorized flood control project in Cumberland, Kentucky.

Authorizes design and construction assistance for recreational facilities at William Jennings Randolph Lake, Maryland and West Virginia; and complete the project for flood damage reduction, Breckenridge, Minnesota, at a specified cost.

Authorizes the project for navigation, New Madrid County Harbor, Missouri.

Authorizes a project at Fort Peck Lake, Montana, for the design and construction of a fish hatchery and associated facilities necessary to sustain a multispecies fishery.

Directs maintenance dredging of the Sagamore Creek Channel, New Hampshire.

Directs a study of the Garrison Dam, North Dakota, feature of the project for flood control, Missouri River Basin, to determine if the damage to a certain water transmission line is the result of a design deficiency and, if so, to correct the deficiency.

Declares specified portions of Erie County, New York, to be nonnavigable waters of the United States, unless the Secretary finds that proposed projects there are not in the public interest.

Deauthorizes specified navigation projects

- Black Warrior and Tombigbee Rivers, Jackson, Alabama;
- Sacramento Deep Water Ship Channel, California
- Bay Island Channel, Illinois
- Warsaw Boat Harbor, Illinois
- Kennebunk River, Maine
- Rockport Harbor, Massachusetts (with a project modification)
- Scituate Harbor, Massachusetts
- Duluth- Superior Harbor, Minnesota and Wisconsin
- Tremley Point, New Jersey
- Angola, New York
- Wallabout Channel, New York
- New York and New Jersey Channels
- Warwick Cove, Rhode Island.

Directs certain real estate transactions in Connecticut, Illinois, Missouri, Pennsylvania, Louisiana, Michigan, and South Carolina.

Authorizes projects on the Narraguagus River, Maine, and Cedar Bayou, Texas, to be carried out by the Secretary, but prohibits construction therein until the Secretary determines that the project is technically sound, environmentally acceptable, and economically justified.

Continues project authorizations for: (1) flood control, Sacramento River, California; and (2) flood protection on a portion of such River.

Amends the Water Resources Development Act of 1992 to include St. Tammany Parish, Louisiana, within authorized projects to address water quality problems associated with storm water runoffs.

== Title IV: Studies ==
Authorizes project studies in Florida, Illinois, Oregon, the Lower Mississippi River, the Upper Mississippi River, the Ohio River, Alabama, the Arkansas River, California, the Delaware River, Georgia, Idaho, Indiana, Kansas, Louisiana, Maine and New Hampshire, Massachusetts and New Hampshire, Minnesota, Mississippi, Nevada, New Hampshire, New York, North Carolina, Ohio, Oklahoma, Rhode Island, South Carolina, Tennessee, and Wisconsin.

== Title V: Miscellaneous Provisions ==
Amends WRDA 1986

- to direct construction of an environmental education and research facility at Otsego Lake, New York.
- to encourage the Great Lakes States to develop and implement a mechanism that provides a common conservation standard with respect to the withdrawal and use of Great Lakes water
- require approval of the Great Lakes Board of Governors prior to the export of Great Lakes water
- to express the sense of Congress that the Secretary of State should work with the Canadian Government to develop a standard for the Great Lakes.
- to extend permanently (currently ends after FY 2003) the authorization of appropriations for the project for Lake Michigan diversion, Illinois.

Amends WRDA 1996

- to add specified sites for authorized water quality restoration projects.
- to add certain technologies to those being considered for the decontamination and disposal of dredged material at the Port of Duluth, Minnesota.
- to increase the amount authorized for a water quality improvement project on the Susquehanna River
- to add specified sites to a watershed management, restoration, and development program
- to add two sites to a navigation channel maintenance program.

Makes certain competitive bid requirements inapplicable to any contract, agreement, or grant entered into between the Secretary and Marshall University or Juniata College in support of the Army civil works program.

Directs a plan for Corps activities that support the management of Great Lakes fisheries; plan, design, and construct projects to support the restoration of the fishery, ecosystem, and beneficial uses of the Great Lakes; and a cooperative agreement with the Great Lakes Fishery Commission or any other agency established to facilitate active State participation in Great Lakes management.

Directs assessment of the condition of water resources and related ecosystems in New England to identify problems and needs for restoring, preserving, and protecting New England water resources, ecosystems, wildlife, and fisheries.

Amends WRDA 1992 to redefine areas authorized for the construction of: (1) a visitors center at Fort Smith, Arkansas; and (2) an interpretive site in Vicksburg, Mississippi.

Authorizes participation in the planning and management associated with the CALFED Bay- Delta Program, an ecosystem restoration program for the San Joaquin and Sacramento River basins, California.

Directs projects for

- necessary repairs of the Lowell Creek Tunnel, Seward, Alaska;
- flood damage reduction project at the Contra Coastal Canal, California
- flood damage reduction project in Huntington Beach, California
- flood damage reduction project at Mallard Slough, Pittsburg, California.
- project for environmental restoration and recreation, Minneapolis, Minnesota.

Directs reimbursement of the non-Federal interest for certain costs under the project for navigation, Port Everglades Harbor, Florida.

Directs a program to convey to eligible property owners the right to maintain existing habitation structures on land acquired by the United States for the Lake Sidney Lanier, Georgia, project; or release such owners from a related easement prohibition as it applies to existing structures.

Authorizes certain environmental quality improvements at Ballard's Island, Illinois, if the Secretary determines that such work is integral to the project.

Directs a proposed comprehensive plan for restoring, preserving, and protecting the Illinois River basin using new technologies and innovative approaches.

Directs (1), if the work is determined integral, the non-Federal costs for certain aquatic ecosystem restoration at Koontz Lake, Indiana; (2) investigate the contamination of the well system in West View Shores, Maryland; and (3) carry out the project for flood damage reduction and environmental restoration at Muddy River, Brookline and Boston, Massachusetts.

Prohibits requiring a cargo vessel equipped with bow thrusters and friction winches traversing the Soo Locks in Sault Ste. Marie, Michigan, to provide more than two crew members to serve as line handlers.

Directs an inventory of dams constructed in Minnesota by the Works Progress Administration, the Works Projects Administration, and the Civilian Conservation Corps, and to assess their condition and need for rehabilitation.

Designates a specified portion of the Boundary Waters Canoe Area Wilderness, Minnesota, as the Bruce F. Vento Unit of the Boundary Waters Canoe Area Wilderness.

Directs participation in restoration projects for critical coastal wetlands and coastal barrier islands in Mississippi.

Directs participation in the project at Las Vegas Wash and Lake Mead in accordance with a specified plan.

Directs a research program to evaluate opportunities to manage peak flood flows in urbanized New Jersey watersheds.

Requires technical assistance to Yonkers, New York, relating to the dredging of the Nepperhan River outlet.

Directs a study, strategy, and project to reduce flood damages and create wildlife habitat in the Upper Mohawk River Basin, New York.

Directs the Secretary to carry out certain flood damage reduction projects in eastern North Carolina and Ohio.

Directs technical assistance to non-Federal interests to evaluate the structural integrity of the bulkhead system along the Cuyahoga River in the vicinity of Cleveland, Ohio.

Directs a long-term lease with the city of Crowder, Oklahoma, under which the city may develop, operate, and maintain as a public park all or a portion of Crowder Point on Lake Eufaula, Oklahoma.

Directs the Secretary to studies and ecosystem restoration projects for the Lower Columbia River and Tillamook Bay estuaries, Oregon and Washington.

Authorizes certain real estate transactions at Raystown Lake project, Pennsylvania and in Aberdeen, Washington.

Directs a plan to support ecosystem restoration of the Charleston Harbor estuary, South Carolina.

Amends WRDA 1999 relating to the Cheyenne River Sioux Tribe, Lower Brule Sioux Tribe, and South Dakota terrestrial wildlife habitat restoration program to: (1) fund such program through funds made available under the Pick-Sloan Missouri Basin Program and through grants to such tribes and South Dakota; (2) require consultation with such tribes in expending amounts from trust funds established for such program; (3) require the Secretary to lease to South Dakota in perpetuity certain recreation areas within the boundaries of the program; (4) require the Secretary to clean up each open dump and hazardous waste site identified on program lands and recreation areas; (5) require such tribes and South Dakota to establish the Cultural Resources Advisory Commission to advise with respect to cultural resources on such lands and recreation areas; (6) require the Secretary to inventory and stabilize each Commission-identified cultural and historic site; (7) direct the Secretary to complete a study, and take appropriate remedial action, with respect to sediment contamination in the Cheyenne River (authorizing appropriations for such purpose); and (8) provide additional authorizations of appropriations for activities added under this section, with specified allocations among such tribes and South Dakota.

Directs a limited reevaluation report of the project for flood control, Horn Lake Creek and tributaries, Tennessee and Mississippi.

Authorizes critical restoration projects in the Lake Champlain watershed, Vermont and New York and Puget Sound, Washington, and adjacent waters.

Directs a study evaluating the structural integrity and need for modification or removal of each of ten specified dams in Vermont.

Directs a feasibility study of providing coastal erosion protection for the tribal reservation of the Shoalwater Bay Tribe on Willapa Bay, Washington.

Modifies the project for flood control, Bluestone Lake, Ohio River basin, West Virginia, to authorize construction of hydroelectric generation facilities by the Tri-Cities Power Authority of West Virginia.

Amends the Water Resources Development Act of 1988 to direct the preservation of the Jenkins House within the Lesage/Greenbottom Swamp, West Virginia.

Authorizes planning and design assistance to non-Federal projects located along the Tug Fork River, West Virginia.

Amends the Water Resources Development Act of 1982 to include environmental restoration within authorized activities under a pilot program for providing certain assistance to non-Federal interests in southern West Virginia.

Directs an agreement with the National Oceanic and Atmospheric Administration (NOAA) for providing NOAA with data on the results of any navigation channel hydrographic survey conducted by the Corps.

Directs the Tennessee Valley Authority to release a specified use restriction with respect to lands in Decatur, Alabama, previously conveyed to the Ingalls Shipbuilding Corporation.

== Title VI: Comprehensive Everglades Restoration ==
Approves the Comprehensive Everglades Restoration Plan, as contained in a specified report dated April 1, 1999, as a framework for modifications and operational changes to the Central and Southern Florida Project that are needed to restore, preserve, and protect the South Florida ecosystem while providing for other water-related needs of the region, including water supply and flood protection. Directs the Secretary to integrate such Project with ongoing Federal and State projects and activities under WRDA 1996. Authorizes the Secretary to implement Project modifications that are described in the Plan and will produce a substantial benefit to the restoration, preservation, and protection of the South Florida ecosystem. Approves with limitations the Loxahatchee National Wildlife Refuge and the Southern Corkscrew Regional Ecosystem.

Prohibits any appropriation from being made for a Plan project until the President and the Governor of Florida enter into a binding agreement to ensure that water made available under the Plan is not otherwise used until sufficient reservations of water for the restoration of the natural system exist. Provides for enforcement of such requirement.

Requires the Secretary and the non-Federal sponsor to develop project implementation reports.

Prohibits Plan implementation from reducing current flood protection levels.

Directs the Secretary and Governor to develop an agreement for resolving disputes associated with Plan implementation.

Requires the Secretary, Secretary of the Interior, and Governor to establish an independent scientific review panel to review the Plan's progress toward achieving its natural system restoration goals.

Requires the Secretary to report to Congress a determination as to whether the ongoing Biscayne Aquifer Storage and Recovery Program in Dade County, Florida, has a substantial benefit to the restoration, preservation, and protection of the South Florida ecosystem.

Expresses the sense of Congress that

- development at the site of the former Homestead Air Force Base could potentially cause significant air, water, and noise pollution and result in the degradation of adjacent national parks
- Federal agencies charged with determining the reuse of such site should carefully consider the environmental impacts of reuse options
- the redevelopment of such site should be consistent with South Florida ecosystem restoration goals
- the Secretary of the Air Force should take certain action so that reuse can proceed expeditiously
- after conveyance of surplus property, the Secretary should reuse such property in a manner consistent with the goals of the Plan; and (6) the Secretary should report to the appropriate congressional committees on actions taken.

== Other Acts within P.L. 106-541 ==
=== Missouri River Protection and Improvement Act of 2000 ===
Establishes the: (1) North Dakota Missouri River Trust committee; and (2) Missouri River Task Force. Requires the Task Force to: (1) prepare and vote on approval of a plan for the use of funds for conservation practices, the control and removal of sediment, and related protection measures for the Missouri River; and (2) review and recommend to the Secretary projects for meeting plan goals and projects critical to plan implementation. Requires the plan to be made available for public review and comment prior to implementation. Directs the Secretary, after plan approval, to identify critical plan restoration projects. Requires the Secretary to ensure that not less than 30 percent of critical project funds are used exclusively for projects that are either within the boundary of an Indian reservation or administered by an Indian tribe.

=== Charles M. Russell National Wildlife Refuge Enhancement Act of 2000 ===
Requires the Secretary and the Secretary of the Interior to prohibit the issuance of new cabin site leases within the Charles M. Russell National Wildlife Refuge, Montana, except as necessary to consolidate with, or substitute for, existing cabin site leases. Requires the Secretary to determine cabin sites that are not suitable for conveyance to a lessee for any reason that adversely impacts the future habitability of the cabin sites, and to offer to such lessees the opportunity to acquire a comparable cabin within the same area. Prohibits the conveyance of cabin sites determined to be unsuitable.

Allows lessees that do not offer to lease a comparable site or who decline such an offer to continue to lease their current site for the remainder of such lease through 2010.

Authorizes sale of cabin sites that are not conveyed and have not been determined to be unsuitable for habitation. Requires proceeds from sold cabin sites to be used to acquire from willing sellers other property within or adjacent to the Refuge that would be suitable to: (1) achieve Refuge wildlife conservation purposes; (2) protect local fish and wildlife habitat; (3) enhance public opportunities for Refuge hunting, fishing, and other wildlife- dependent activities; (4) improve Refuge management; or (5) reduce Federal expenditures associated with administration of the cabin site leases.

=== Missouri River Restoration Act of 2000 ===
Establishes the: (1) Missouri River Trust committee; and (2) Missouri River Task Force. Requires the Task Force to: (1) prepare and vote on approval of a plan for the use of funds for conservation practices along the Missouri River watershed, including sediment control and removal, protection of Indian, historical and cultural sites, and erosion control; and (2) review and recommend to the Secretary projects critical to plan implementation. Requires the plan to be made available for public review and comment prior to implementation. Directs the Secretary, after plan approval, to identify critical plan restoration projects. Requires the Secretary to ensure that not less than 30 percent of critical project funds are used exclusively for projects that are either within the boundary of an Indian reservation or administered by an Indian tribe.

== See also ==
- Flood Control Act
- Rivers and Harbors Act
