= Biscayne Bay =

Florida lagoon

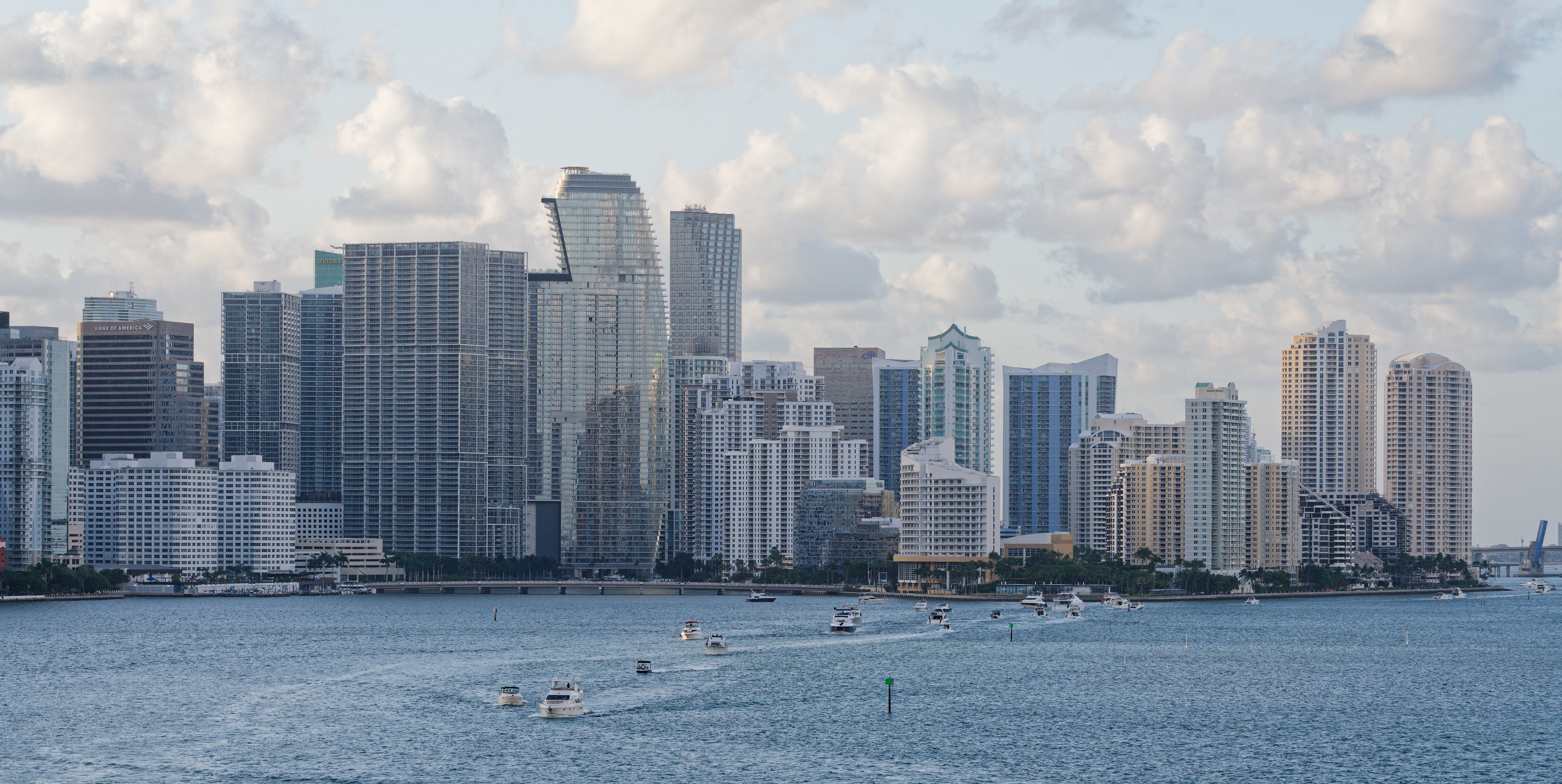
- Northern Biscayne Bay with the Downtown Miami skyline in the background in April 2025

- Location of Biscayne Bay in Florida
- Coordinates: 25°33′57″N 80°12′59″W
- Ocean/sea sources: Atlantic Ocean
- Basin countries: United States
- Max. length: 60 miles (97 km)
- Max. width: 8 miles (13 km)
- Surface area: 271 square miles (700 km^{2})
- Settlements: Miami; Miami Beach, Florida
- References: Length & width: Area:

Biscayne Bay is a lagoon with characteristics of an estuary located on the Atlantic coast of South Florida. The northern end of the lagoon is surrounded by the densely developed heart of the Miami metropolitan area while the southern end is largely undeveloped with a large portion of the lagoon included in Biscayne National Park.

The part of the lagoon that is traditionally called "Biscayne Bay" is approximately 35 miles (56 km) long and up to 8 miles (13 km) wide, with a surface area of 221 square miles (570 km^{2}). Various definitions may include Dumfoundling Bay, Card Sound, and Barnes Sound in a larger "Biscayne Bay", which is 60 miles (97 km) long with a surface area of about 271 square miles (700 km^{2}).

== Etymology ==
In the 16th century, the Spanish Hernando de Escalante Fontaneda wrote of a sailor from the Bay of Biscay, in what is now the northern coast of Spain, known as the Vizcaíno, or Biscayno, who lived for a time on Florida's lower east coast after being shipwrecked. A 17th-century map later recorded a Cayo de Biscainhos, probably the source of the name Key Biscayne. The lagoon was known as "Key Biscayne Bay" in the 19th century, finally shrinking to "Biscayne Bay" late in the 19th century.

=== Other names ===
The lagoon has been known by several names. Juan Ponce de León called it Chequescha in 1513, and Pedro Menéndez de Avilés called it Tequesta in 1565. Those names are variant spellings of "Tequesta", the name of the people who lived around the lagoon at the time. The British, during their occupation of Florida (1763–1783), called the lagoon "Cape River", "Dartmouth Sound", and "Sandwich gulph".

== Geography ==
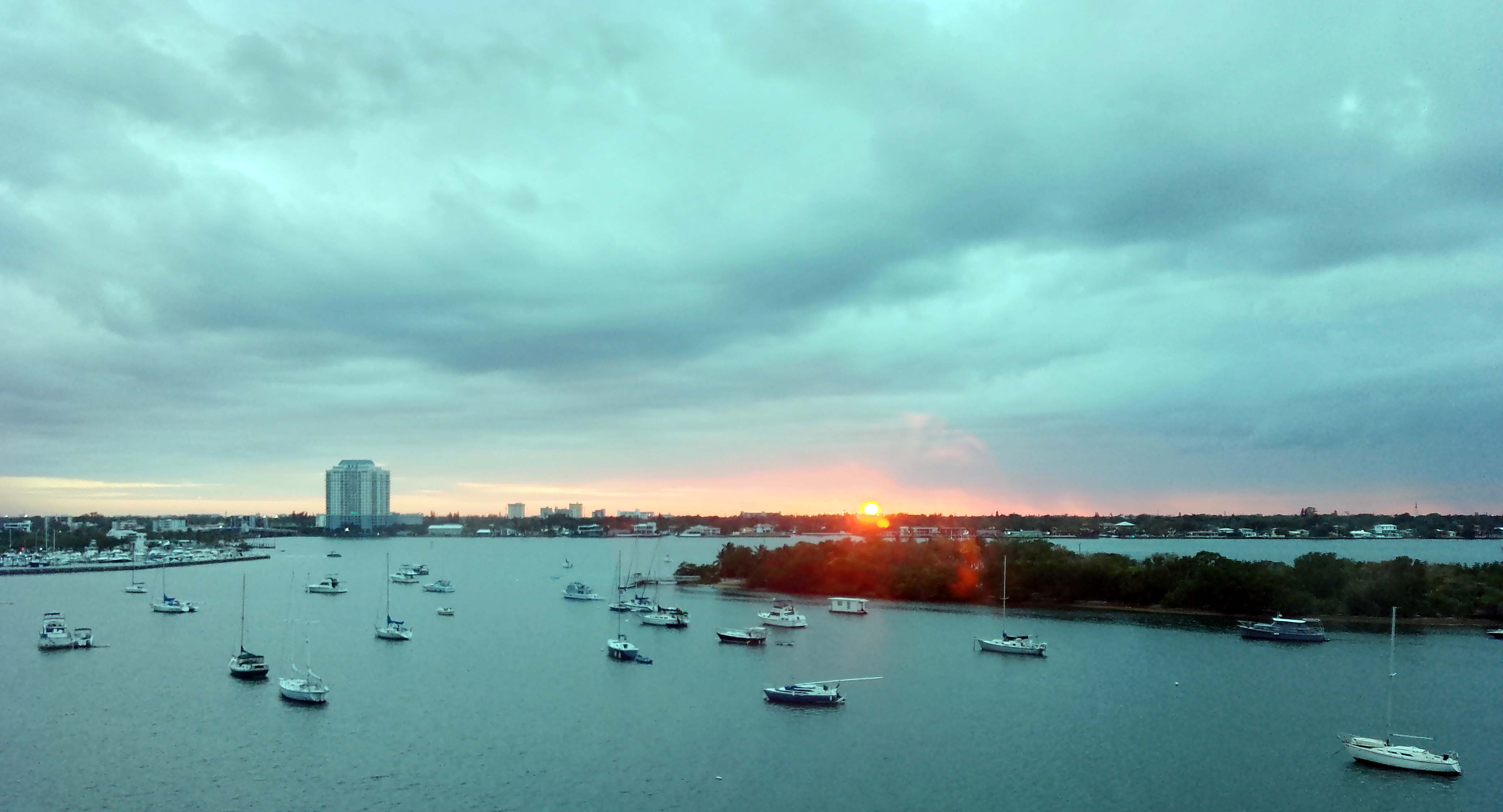
Biscayne Bay during the sunset; Pelican Island is on the right

Biscayne Bay is a semi- or subtropical lagoon extending most of the length of Miami-Dade County, from North Miami Beach to the upper Florida Keys. Biscayne Bay, in the strictest sense, extends from a point between North Miami Beach and Sunny Isles Beach south to the Arsenicker Keys and the Cutter Bank just to the east of those islands. Many discussions about the lagoon include Dumfoundling Bay, a small lagoon just north of North Miami Beach, as part of Biscayne Bay, and include Card Sound and Barnes Sound, in southern Miami-Dade County adjacent to Key Largo, as either part of a system of connected lagoons including Biscayne Bay, or as part of Biscayne Bay itself. The lagoon is bordered on its west by the mainland of Florida, and is separated from the Atlantic Ocean to the east by a string of barrier islands in the northern part of the lagoon, a large shoal in the central section, and the northernmost of the Florida Keys in the south. The lagoon is about 35 miles (56 km) long from Dumfoundling Bay (25° 58′ North latitude) (north of North Miami Beach) to Card Sound, and another 25 miles (40 km) to Jewfish Creek (25° 24′ North latitude), if Card Sound and Barnes Sound are included in the lagoon. The lagoon is 8 miles (13 km) across at its widest point. The lagoon, from Dumfoundling Bay to the Arsenicker Keys, has a surface area of about 572 square kilometres (221 sq mi). The larger lagoon, including Card Sound and Barnes Sound, has a surface area of about 703 square kilometres (271 sq mi). It has an average depth of 1.8 metres (5.9 ft) and, except where channels have been dredged, a maximum depth of 4 metres (13 ft).

The eastern rim of the lagoon is based on an ancient coral reef which existed along the southeastern edge of the Florida Platform about 100,000 years ago. The ensuing Wisconsin glaciation lowered sea levels, leaving the reef above water. The dead reef became fossilized, forming the Key Largo Limestone (commonly called "coral rock"). Key Largo Limestone underlies the Eastern edge of the barrier islands and the shoals (Safety Valve) along the northern and middle part of the lagoon. It makes a brief appearance at Soldier Key, in the middle of the Safety Valve, and rises above sea level to the south to form the upper Florida Keys.

The western side of the bay has characteristics of an estuary, with 16 waterways, the largest of which is the Miami River, flowing into it. All of the waterways have saltwater intrusion control structures, which restrict the flow of saltwater inland, and regulate the flow of fresh water into the lagoon. Some fresh water enters the lagoon as groundwater flow from the Biscayne Aquifer. All of the bedrock under the lagoon west of the ancient reef, and the adjacent mainland, consists of Miami Limestone, an oolitic limestone that formed in a lagoon behind the ancient reef that became the Key Largo limestone, and is the same age as the Key Largo limestone. The limestone bottom of the lagoon is overlain by 1.2 to 4.6 metres (3.9 to 15.1 ft) of sand, carbonate mud, and coral rubble sediments.

For purposes of discussion and analysis, Biscayne Bay is often divided into three sections: North Bay, Central Bay, and South Bay.

=== North Bay ===
Chart of North Bay

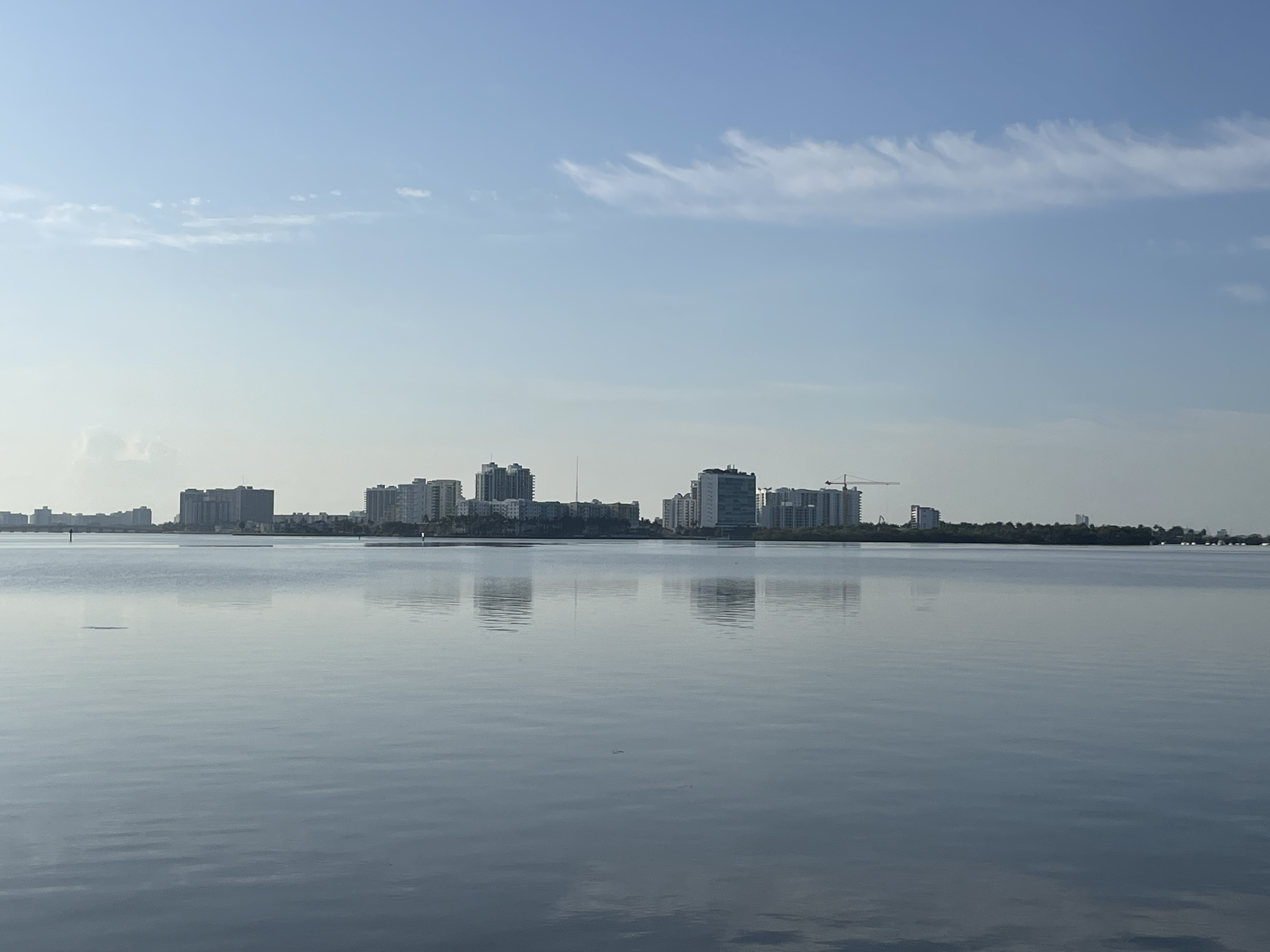
Biscayne Bay seen from Bayfront Park in Miami Shores

The North Bay of Biscayne Bay principally lies between Miami Beach on a barrier island and Miami on the mainland, from Dumfoundling Bay on the north to the Rickenbacker Causeway to the south. Other municipalities on the western shore of the lagoon include Aventura (on Dumfoundling Bay), North Miami Beach, North Miami, and Miami Shores. Municipalities bordering the lagoon on the barrier islands north of Miami Beach include Sunny Isles Beach, Bal Harbour, Bay Harbor Islands, Surfside, and Indian Creek Village. North Bay Village is located on two artificial islands in the middle of the lagoon. North Bay is the part of the lagoon that has been most modified by human works, including channels and other dredged areas, and spoil banks and artificial islands created with material dredged from channels. More than 40% of the area of North Bay had either been dredged or filled to form artificial islands, and more than half of the remaining lagoon bottom is barren. Coastal wetlands have been almost eliminated in North Bay. Turbidity is high in North Bay due to erosion from spoil islands and banks, and the lack of vegetation on the lagoon bottom. The spoil islands host large quantities of invasive plant species.

North Bay is separated from the Atlantic Ocean by barrier islands. Freshwater sources flowing into North Bay include Oleta River, Arch Creek, Biscayne Canal, Little River and Miami River. Tidal flow between North Bay and the ocean is through Baker's Haulover Inlet, Government Cut, and Norris Cut.

Northeast 163rd Street, or Sunny Isles Boulevard, connects North Miami Beach and Sunny Isles Beach across the section of the Intracoastal Waterway running between Dumfoundling Bay and Biscayne Bay proper. Five causeways cross North Bay between Northeast 163rd Street and the Rickenbacker Causeway, including:

- Broad Causeway, connecting North Miami and Bal Harbour via the Bay Harbor Islands,
- John F. Kennedy (79th Street) Causeway, connecting Miami and Miami Beach via North Bay Village,
- Julia Tuttle Causeway (I-195), connecting Miami and Miami Beach,
- Venetian Causeway, connecting Miami and Miami Beach via the Venetian Islands, and
- MacArthur Causeway, connecting Miami and Miami Beach via Watson Island.

More than 20 islands in North Bay north from the MacArthur Causeway have been created, in whole or in part, with material dredged from the lagoon bottom. Most of the islands, such as the Venetian Islands, are residential. Brickell Key, another residential island, is just south of the mouth of the Miami River. Dodge Island, across the main ship channel to the south of the MacArthur Causeway, was enlarged in the 1960s when the Port of Miami was moved there from the mainland north of Bayfront Park. The Miami Marine Stadium was built on the north side of the Rickenbacker Causeway extending from the east side of Virginia Key in the early 1960s. There are also many undeveloped spoil islands in North Bay, such as Sandspur Island and the Picnic Islands.

=== Central Bay ===
Chart of Central Biscayne Bay

Central Bay is the largest part of the bay. It extends from the Rickenbacker Causeway and Virginia Key on the north to the Featherbed Bank, which runs across the bay from Black Point to Boca Chita Key. It is separated from the Atlantic Ocean by Key Biscayne, the Safety Valve, and the Ragged Keys, the northernmost of the Florida Keys. It is bordered on the western shore by the municipalities of Miami, Coral Gables, Palmetto Bay, Cutler Bay, and a portion of unincorporated Miami-Dade County. Key Biscayne occupies the middle third of the island on the eastern side of Central Bay.

Fresh water sources for Central Bay include the Coral Gables Waterway and Snapper Creek. Tidal flow between Central Bay and the ocean is through Bear Cut between Virginia Key and Key Biscayne and across the Safety Valve. The development that has so transformed North Bay has spread over much of the northern shores of Central Bay. Miami Seaquarium and the University of Miami's Rosenstiel School of Marine, Atmospheric, and Earth Science are located on the southern end of Virginia Key, the only part of that island bordering on Central Bay. Grove Isle, near the Miami neighborhood of Coconut Grove, is an artificial island in Central Bay. The large marina at Dinner Key is also in Coconut Grove. Central Bay has been adversely affected primarily by bulkheading, urban runoff discharged by canals, and the loss of natural fresh water flow.

=== South Bay ===
Chart of South Bay, Card Sound, and Barnes Sound

South Bay is nearly as large as Central Bay, and is defined as extending from the Featherbed Bank to the Arsenicker Keys, or to Cutter Bank, which is to the east of the Arsenicker Keys. (Brown et al. define South Bay as consisting of Card Sound and Barnes Sound.) It is separated from the ocean by the northernmost of the Florida Keys, from Boca Chita Key to Old Rhodes Key. Fresh water sources for South Bay include Black Creek, Goulds Canal, North Canal, Florida City Canal, and Model Land Canal. Tidal exchange with the ocean occurs through Sands Cut, Caesar's Creek and Broad Creek. Boca Chita Key, Elliott Key, and Old Rhodes Key were all enlarged by dredging in the first half of the 20th century. Boca Chita Key was the site of some construction in the early 20th century. Mark C. Honeywell bought the key in 1937, and built a large retreat on the island, including a 65-foot (20 m) tall faux lighthouse. South Bay is the least affected by human activities, although it also suffers from the loss of natural fresh water flow. The Turkey Point Nuclear Generating Station is a significant presence on the mainland shore.

==== Card Sound and Barnes Sound ====
Card Sound is an extension of Biscayne Bay to the south of South Bay. Little Card Sound is the next south, separated from Card Sound by Card Bank. The causeway of the Card Sound Bridge now separates Barnes Sound to the south of Little Card Sound. Manatee Bay is to the west of Barnes Sound. Card Sound and Barnes Sound are bounded on the east by Key Largo. South Biscayne Bay is sometimes defined as including Card Sound and Barnes Sound. Barnes Sound is connected to Florida Bay through a few small channels.

Manatee Bay is partially separated from Barnes Sound by Short Key and Main Key. In 1994, it was described as having particularly undisturbed habitat for a location in the Florida Keys. Due to its distance from the open ocean and the restrictive passages between other components of Biscayne Bay, Manatee Bay experiences low tidal exchange, while the C-197 canal allows fresh water from the C-111 canal to flow into Manatee Bay. Salinity levels in Manatee Bay range from 14 parts-per-thousand (ppt) to 45 ppt (seawater has an average salinity of 35 ppt). In July 2023, the bay was in the news when a buoy there recorded a water temperature of 101.1 °F (38.4 °C).

=== Safety Valve ===
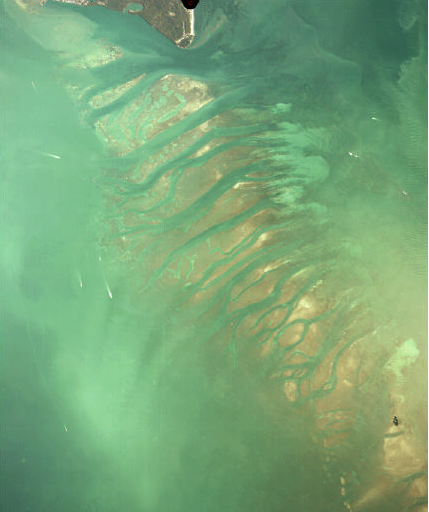
Aerial view of the Safety Valve from the southern end of Key Biscayne (top) to Soldier Key

The Safety Valve is a series of shallow sand flats separated by tidal flow channels, stretching about 8 miles (13 km) from the south end of Key Biscayne to the Ragged Keys just north of the Florida Keys. The term "safety valve" was applied to the tidal flats by Ralph Munroe, who argued against building a causeway and bridges connecting Key Biscayne to the Ragged Keys and beyond on the grounds that such construction would block the free outflow of storm surges from the bay across the flats to the ocean. It is believed that it does moderate the effects of storm surges on the bay. The transportation of sand southward along the Atlantic Coast of Florida by longshore drift ends in the area of the Safety Valve. The structure of the Safety Valve has been stable for at least the last century. (The area was called Bocas de Miguel de Mora on Spanish maps and derroteros during the era of Spanish Florida.) Stiltsville is a collection of buildings on pilings on several sand flats at the northern end of the Safety Valve.

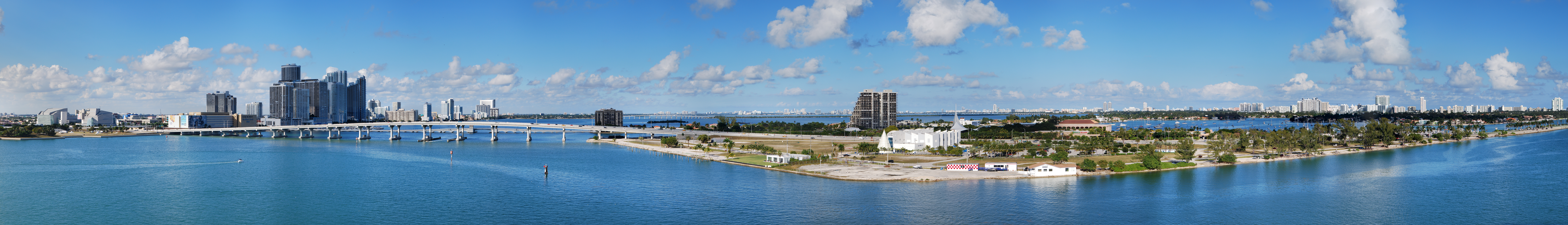
Panoramic view of the bay from the PortMiami

== History ==
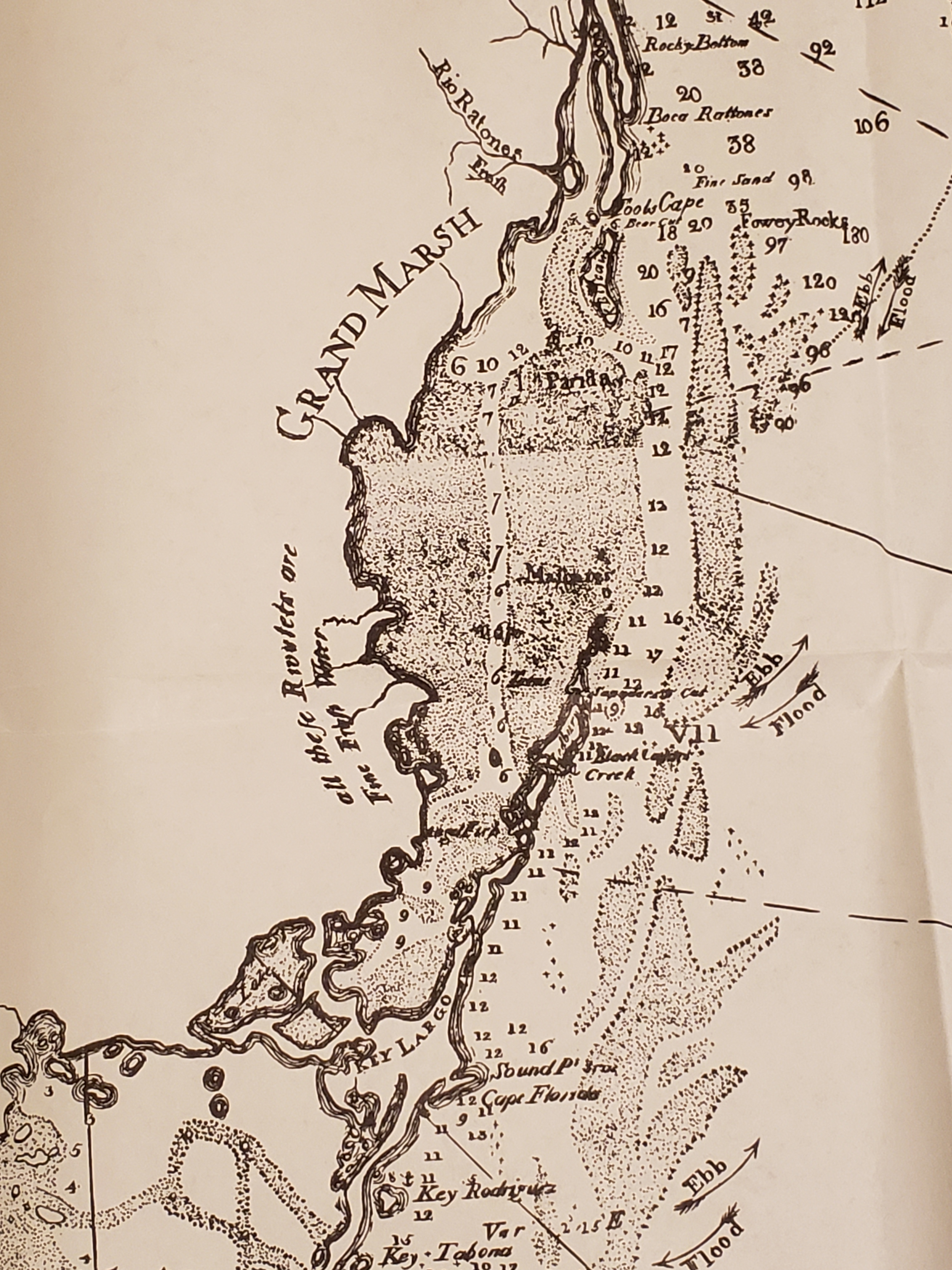
An early 1770s map of Biscayne Bay by Bernard Romans

What is now Biscayne Bay was a freshwater basin 4,000 years ago. As the sea level rose, ocean water entered the basin, turning it into an estuary/lagoon. Before the 20th century, a coastal ridge west of and parallel to the bay caused most of the ground water west of the ridge to flow towards the Everglades and Florida Bay, while ground water on the narrow coastal strip east of the ridge flowed into the bay. Freshwater marshes were located all along the western shore of the bay, and fresh water springs were located along the shore and on the bottom of the bay. Ralph Munroe noted in the late 19th century that potable water could be pumped from one of those bay bottom springs. Springs can still be found in the bay, but the water from them is now brackish.

People lived in the area that is now Biscayne Bay long before the bay was formed. Human bones, teeth, and artifacts that are almost 11,000 years old have been found at the Cutler Fossil Site, a sinkhole that is now a couple of kilometers from the bay. At the time of European contact, in the early 16th century, the area around the bay was occupied by the Tequesta. The Tequesta belonged to the Glades culture, which had been in place for about 2,000 years. The chief town of the Tequesta, also called Tequesta, was on the bay at the mouth of the Miami River, from about 1200. The Miami Circle, just south of the mouth of the Miami River, has been proposed to be post holes for a structure. The site was abandoned in about 1200, when the town site north of the river was occupied.

Juan Ponce de León visited Biscayne Bay in 1513, and Pedro Menéndez de Avilés did so in 1565.

Early accounts by Spanish explorers indicated the existence of one or more inlets somewhere on the long barrier spit then separating the northern end of Biscayne Bay from the ocean (one called "Boca Rattones" appears on the 1770s map by Bernard Romans), but such inlets open and close over time. At the beginning of the 19th century, there was no inlet through the barrier spit between the New River inlet in Fort Lauderdale and Bear Cut, at the south end of what is now Virginia Key. Hurricanes in 1835 and 1838 opened a new inlet, Narrows Cut (now known as Norris Cut), separating Virginia Key from what is now Fisher Island at the south end of Miami Beach.

The opening of Government Cut in 1905 separated Fisher Island from Miami Beach and slightly shortened the barrier spit. The dredging of Baker's Haulover Inlet in 1925 across the barrier spit near the north end of the bay converted that part of the barrier spit where Miami Beach was located into a barrier island. Modification of the flow of fresh water through waterways, and the opening of Government Cut and the Baker's Haulover Inlet during the 20th century increased the salinity of the lagoon. Dredging of the ship channel and turning basin for the Port of Miami and other navigation channels, including the Intracoastal Waterway, has resulted in the build up of artificial islands in the Northern Bay. As of 1981 more than 40% of the area of North Bay had either been dredged or filled to form artificial islands. Seawalls line almost all of the shoreline of North Bay.

The bay has been severely affected over the last century by raw sewage releases, urban runoff, shoreline bulkheading, dredging, the creation of artificial islands and the loss of natural fresh water flow into the bay. However, water quality has steadily improved since regular monitoring began in 1979. North Bay accounts for only 10% of the water area of the bay.

== Causeways ==
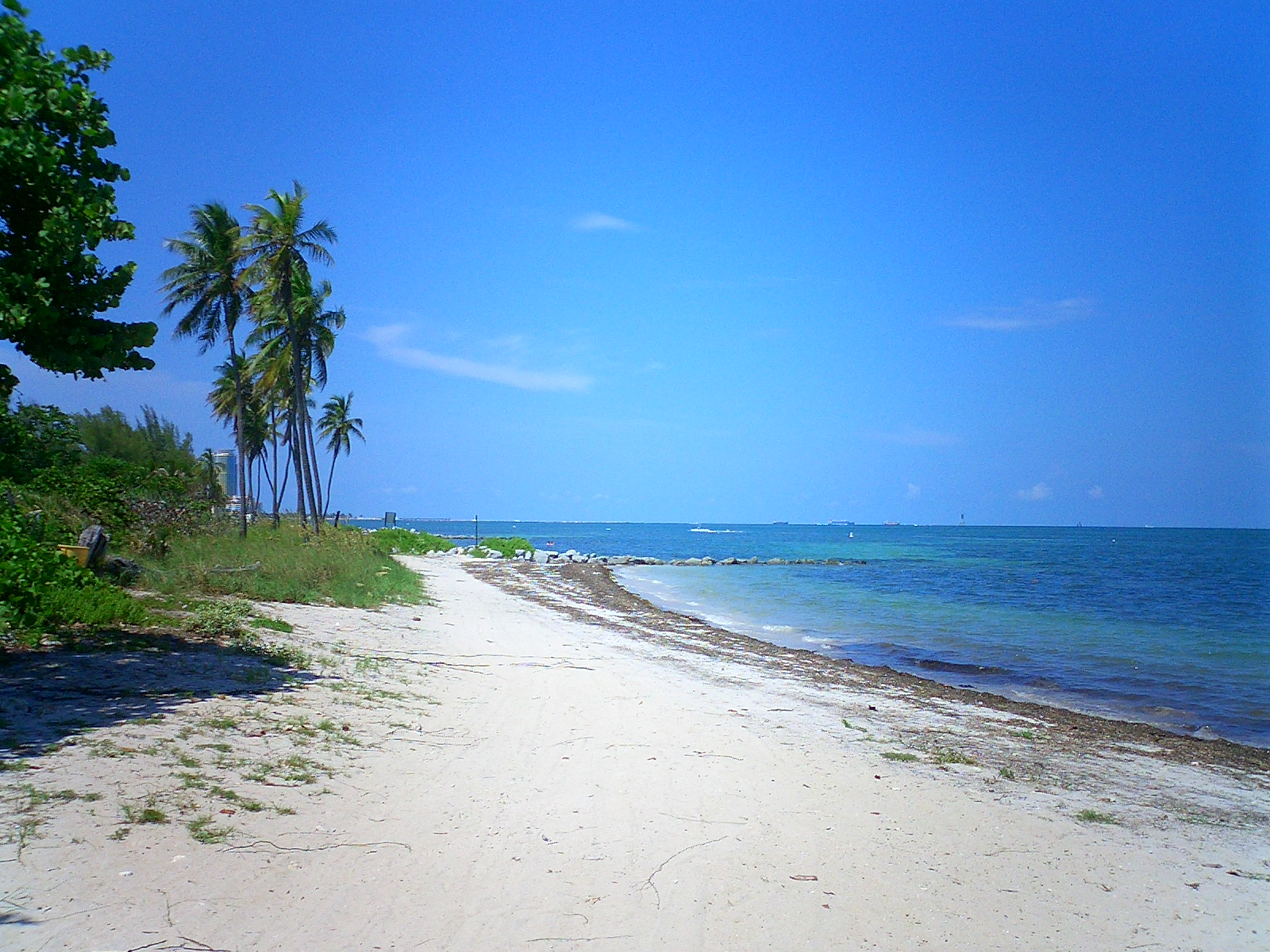
The beach at Virginia Key in July 2004

The first bridge across Biscayne Bay was the 2.5-mile (4.0 km) wooden Collins Bridge built in 1912 by John S. Collins and his son-in-law Thomas Pancoast, who formed the Miami Beach Improvement Corporation; financing was provided by Carl G. Fisher and the Miami banker brothers John N. Lummus and James E. Lummus. Construction began on July 22, 1912. Although the cost of the project was initially $75,000, the construction project faced delays and cost overruns. The bridge was partially completed in 1913. The bridge was "hailed as the longest wooden vehicle bridge in the world, and opened up the area as a luxury winter resort and playground." The bridge terminated at the Dixie Highway, built by Carl G. Fisher. The bridge was a toll bridge; in 1920, the toll was reduced from 20 cents each way (for two-seat cars) to 15 cents one way (and 25 cents round-trip). The bridge was sold to the Biscayne Bay Improvement Association, which developed five artificial islands that became known as the Venetian Islands: Biscayne and San Marco in Miami, San Marino, Di Lido, and Rivo Alto in Miami Beach. The bridge was torn down in 1925 and replaced with the "more substantial" Venetian Causeway the next year.

The Lummus brothers lobbied for the county commission's support for a second causeway connecting Miami to the barrier islands of Miami Beach, and the County Causeway—later the MacArthur Causeway—opened on February 17, 1920. In 1925, Biscayne Point was created in Miami Beach's north end. In 1929, a third causeway crossed Biscayne Bay at Normandy Isle, which developer Henri Levy had created several years earlier by dredging and filling the south half of Meade Island. The Julia Tuttle Causeway was built in 1959.

Other causeways are the John F. Kennedy (79th Street) and Broad causeways (connecting the Miami mainland), and the Rickenbacker Causeway (connecting Miami to Key Biscayne). The Card Sound Bridge connects the mainland in the Homestead, Florida area to the northern part of Key Largo.

== Parks and marinas ==
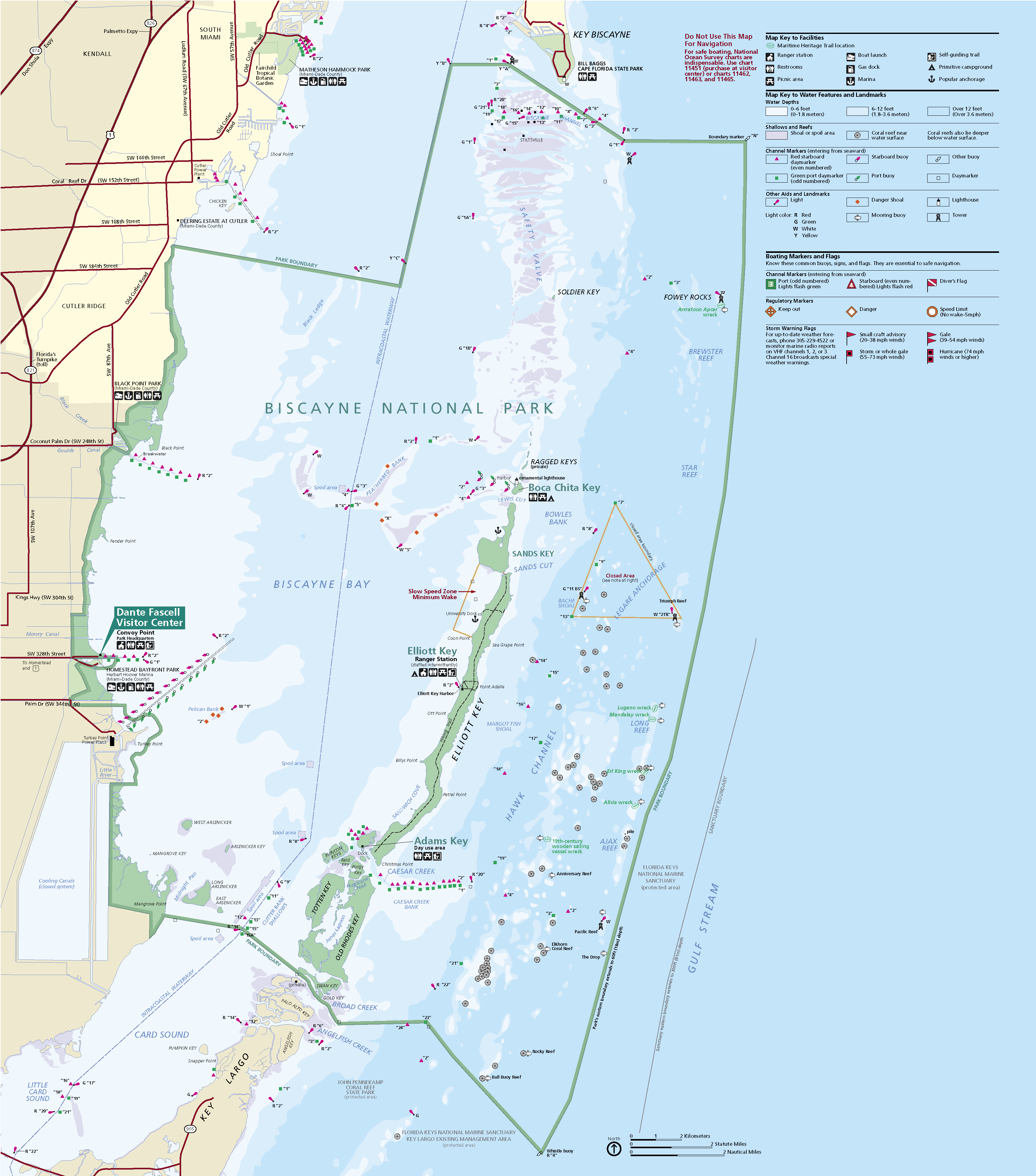
Biscayne National Park includes most of Central and almost all of South Biscayne Bay.

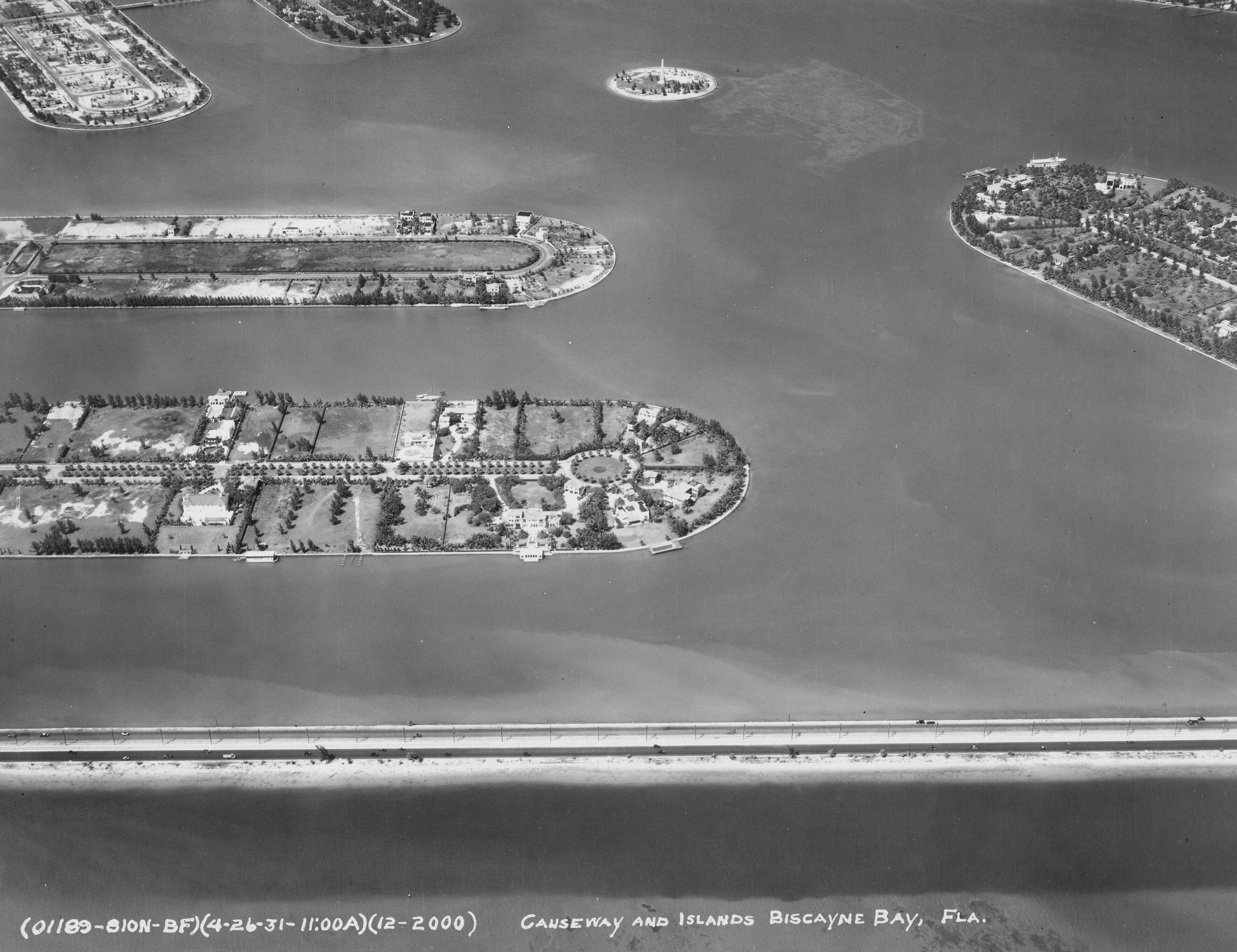
Biscayne Bay Causeway in 1931

Most of Central Bay and almost all of South Bay, as well as the Safety Valve and the Florida Keys north of Key Largo, are within the boundaries of Biscayne National Park. A number of other state and local parks front on the lagoon, primarily on North Bay and the northern rim of Central Bay.

Bill Baggs Cape Florida State Park is located on the southern part of Key Biscayne. Oleta River State Park is located on the south side of the Oleta River where it flows into the segment of the Intracoastal Waterway connecting Dumfoundling Bay and North Bay, fronting on North Bay as it widens to the south.

Miami-Dade County operates a number of parks with frontage on Biscayne Bay. Haulover Park is on the barrier island running north from Baker's Haulover Inlet. Crandon Park covers the northern part of Key Biscayne. The Vizcaya Museum and Gardens are located on the mainland in Miami near the northern edge of Central Bay. Matheson Hammock Park, the Charles Deering Estate, and Chapman Field Park are on the mainland along the western shore of Central Bay. Black Point Park and Marina and Homestead Bayfront Park are on the mainland on the western shore of South Bay. Black Point, Crandon, Haulover, Homestead Bayfront and Matheson Hammock parks have public marinas. The county also operates Pelican Harbor Marina, which includes a small park. It is located on the John F. Kennedy (79th Street) Causeway in North Bay.

The City of Miami has many parks fronting on the lagoon, the more important of which are Bayfront Park, Alice Wainwright Park, Margaret Pace Park, Maurice A. Ferré Park, Morningside Park, and Peacock Park. Public marinas on Biscayne Bay operated by the City of Miami include: Dinner Key Marina, Miami Marine Stadium Marina, and Miamarina at Bayside.

== Protected areas ==
The Biscayne Bay Aquatic Preserve includes most of Biscayne Bay (in the wider sense) that is not in Biscayne National Park. The preserve was created by the Florida Legislature in 1974, and then included all of Biscayne Bay from the Oleta River to the southern end of Card Sound. The preserve was split into two parts when the Biscayne National Monument became Biscayne National Park. The northern part extends from the headwaters of the Oleta River to the northern boundary of Biscayne National Park, just to the south of Key Biscayne on the east, and just to the south of Chicken Key, part of the Charles Deering Estate, on the west. The southern part of the preserve includes Card Sound. The preserve includes about 69,000 acres (280 km^{2}) of submerged land owned by the state. The Biscayne Bay-Cape Florida to Monroe County Line Aquatic Preserve was created in 1975. That preserve ran from Cape Florida to the Miami-Dade County-Monroe County line, and from the limit of Florida territorial waters in the Atlantic to the Intracoastal Waterway in Biscayne Bay. When the Biscayne National Monument was upgraded to a National Park, all waters in the National Park were removed from the Biscayne Bay-Cape Florida to Monroe County Line Aquatic Preserve. The remainder of that preserve consists of about 4,163 acres (16.85 km^{2}) of submerged lands near Key Biscayne. The two preserves are known collectively as the Biscayne Bay Aquatic Preserves. Card Sound and Barnes Sound lie within the Florida Keys National Marine Sanctuary.

The Crocodile Lake National Wildlife Refuge on Key Largo includes 650 acres (2.6 km^{2}) of open water in Card Sound and Barnes Sound. Lobsters are protected year-round in the Biscayne Bay-Card Sound Lobster Sanctuary. The sanctuary includes all of the lagoon from a line running from Cape Florida to Matheson Hammock County Park south to the Card Sound Bridge and causeway.

== Threats ==
The sea level at Virginia Key has been rising at an average rate of 2.97 millimetres (0.117 in) a year from 1931 to 2020, equivalent to 0.97 feet (0.30 m) a century. The islands adjacent to the lagoon are low-lying and threatened with significant flooding in the near future. Gas and oil exploration wells have been drilled near the lagoon, although none reached exploitable deposits. Canals and quarries have disturbed the bedrock on the shores of the lagoon.

Miami-Dade County operates a 300-acre (120 ha) landfill at Black Point adjacent to the lagoon.

Miami-Dade County operates three wastewater treatment plants close to the lagoon. The oldest is the Central District Wastewater Treatment Plant on Virginia Key. The North District Wastewater Treatment Plant is in North Miami, and the South District Wastewater Treatment Plant is at Black Point.

== Sources ==
- Blank, Joan Gill (1996). Key Biscayne: A History of Miami's Tropical Island and the Cape Florida Lighthouse. Sarasota, Florida: Pineapple Press. ISBN 1-56164-096-4.
- Bramson, Seth (2005). Miami Beach. Charleston, South Carolina: Arcadia Publishing. ISBN 0-7385-4174-5.
- Brown, Gary L.; McAdory, Robert; Nail, Gregory H.; Sarruff, Maria Soraya; Berger, R. C.; Gtanat, Mitch A. (September 2003). "Development of Two-Dimensional Numerical Model of Hydrodynamics and Salinity for Biscayne Bay, Florida" (PDF). Defence Technical Information Center. Archived (PDF) from the original on April 22, 2021.
- Corcoran, Eugene F.; Brown, Melvin S.; Baddour, Frederick R.; Chasens, Steven A.; Freay, Anna D. (February 2005). "1983 Biscayne Bay Hydrocarbon Study". National Oceanic and Atmospheric Administration. (automatically downloads pdf)
- Klepser, Carolyn (2014). Lost Miami Beach. The History Press. ISBN 9781626194281.
- Leynes, Jennifer Brown; Cullison, David (January 1998). "Biscayne National Park: Historic Resource Study" (PDF). U.S. National Park Service. Archived from the original (PDF) on April 14, 2013.
- Milano, Gary R. (2000). "Island Restoration and Enhancement in Biscayne Bay, Florida" (PDF). Miami-Dade Department of Environmental Resources Management.
- Reilly, Benjamin (2005). Tropical Surge: A History of Ambition and Disaster on the Florida Shore. Sarasota, Florida: Pineapple Press. ISBN 1-56164-330-0.
- Roessler, Martin A.; Beardsley, Gary L. (1974). "Biscayne Bay: Its Environment and Problems". Florida Scientist. 37 (4): 186–204. JSTOR 24320112.
- Smith, Ned P. (Summer 2001). "Tides of Biscayne Bay, Card Sound, Little Card Sound, Barnes Sound, and Manatee Bay, Florida". Florida Scientist. 64: 224–236. JSTOR 24321024.
- Thornberry-Erlich, Trista L. (February 9, 2005). "Biscayne National Park Geologic Resource Management Issues Scoping summary" (PDF). U.S. National Park Service. Archived from the original (PDF) on May 11, 2017.
- Wang, John D.; Luo, Jiangang; Ault, Jerald S. (May 2003). "Flows, salinity, and some implications for larval transport in South Biscayne Bay, Florida". Bulletin of Marine Science. 72: 695–723 – via Ingenta Connect.
- Whitaker, Sigur E. (2011). James Allison: A Biography of the Engine Manufacturer and Indianapolis 500 Cofounder. Jefferson, North Carolina: McFarland & Company. ISBN 978-0-7864-6165-3.
