= USS Barnes (CVE-20) =

United States Navy escort carrier during World War II

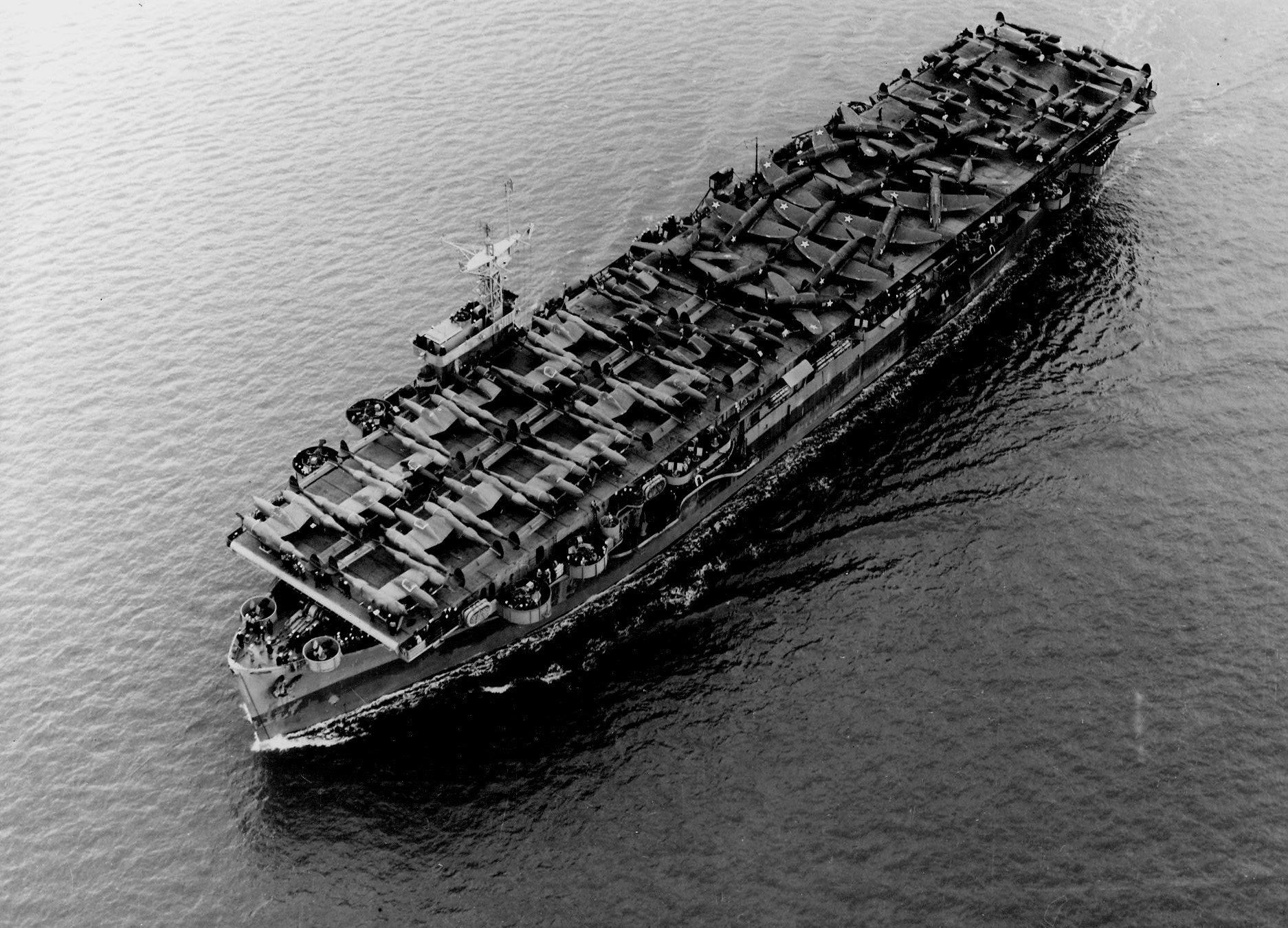
- USS Barnes transporting P-38s and P-47s, 1943

History

United States
- Name: USS Barnes
- Namesake: Barnes Sound, Florida
- Builder: Seattle-Tacoma Shipbuilding
- Laid down: 19 January 1942
- Launched: 2 May 1942
- Commissioned: 20 February 1943
- Decommissioned: 29 August 1946
- Identification: CVE-20
- Fate: Sold for scrap, 1 March 1959

General characteristics
- Class & type: Bogue-class escort carrier
- Displacement: 7,800 tons
- Length: 495.66 ft (151.08 m)
- Beam: 111.5 ft (34.0 m)
- Draft: 26 ft (7.9 m)
- Speed: 17.6 kn (32.6 km/h; 20.3 mph)
- Complement: 890
- Armament: 2 × 4"/50, 5"/38 or 5"/51 guns
- Aircraft carried: 24

USS Barnes (AVG-20/ACV-20/CVE-20) was a Bogue-class escort carrier in the United States Navy. She was the second ship to carry the name.

Barnes was laid down under a Maritime Commission contract and was transferred to the United States Navy on 1 May 1942. The ship was launched on 22 May 1942 by Seattle-Tacoma Shipbuilding, Tacoma, Washington, sponsored by Mrs. G. L. Hutchinson, the widow of Lieutenant Hutchinson. Barnes was commissioned on 20 February 1943 with Captain Cato Douglas Glover in command. Originally classified AVG-20, she was reclassified ACV-20 on 20 August 1942, CVE-20 on 15 July 1943, and CVHE-20 on 12 June 1955.

== Service history ==
The major task of Barnes throughout World War II was the transporting of aircraft and personnel from the United States to the forward areas of the Pacific. In addition she served as a combat, training and pilot qualifying carrier.

While performing these duties she launched her planes on several raids against Tarawa Atoll in the Gilbert Islands operation from 20 November–5 December 1943, and provided invaluable aircraft replenishment to the various task groups of the 3rd Fleet during the western Caroline Islands operation from 6 September–14 October 1944, and the Luzon attacks on 19 October 1944.

After Japan's surrender, Barnes remained in the Far East on occupation duty until 3 November 1945. Returning to the United States in March 1946, Barnes remained on the West Coast for a period of time and then steamed to Boston, Massachusetts, where she was placed out of commission in reserve on 29 August 1946. Redesignated as a helicopter escort carrier (CVHE-20) on 12 June 1955, she was stricken for disposal on 1 March 1959.

== Awards ==
Barnes was awarded three battle stars for her service during World War II.
