= Florida Bay =

US estuary connected to the Gulf of Mexico

Coordinates: 25°00′01″N 80°44′59″W

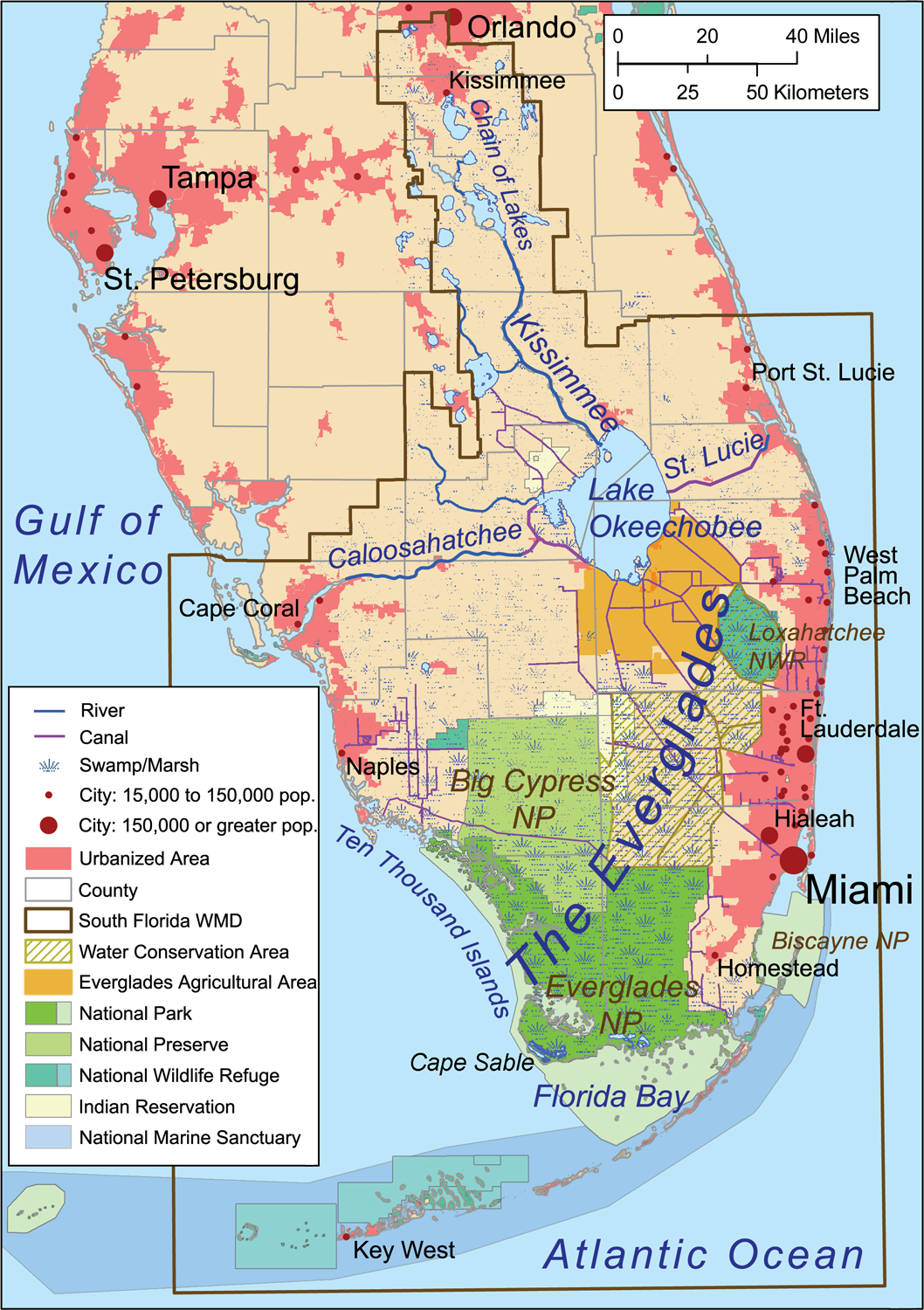
Southern third of Florida, showing Florida Bay in pale green off the southern tip of the mainland

Florida Bay is the bay located between the southern end of the Florida mainland (the Florida Everglades) and the Florida Keys in the United States. It is a large, shallow estuary that while connected to the Gulf of Mexico, has limited exchange of water due to shallow mudbanks dividing the bay into many basins or lakes. The banks separate the bay into basins, each with its own unique physical characteristics.

== Description ==
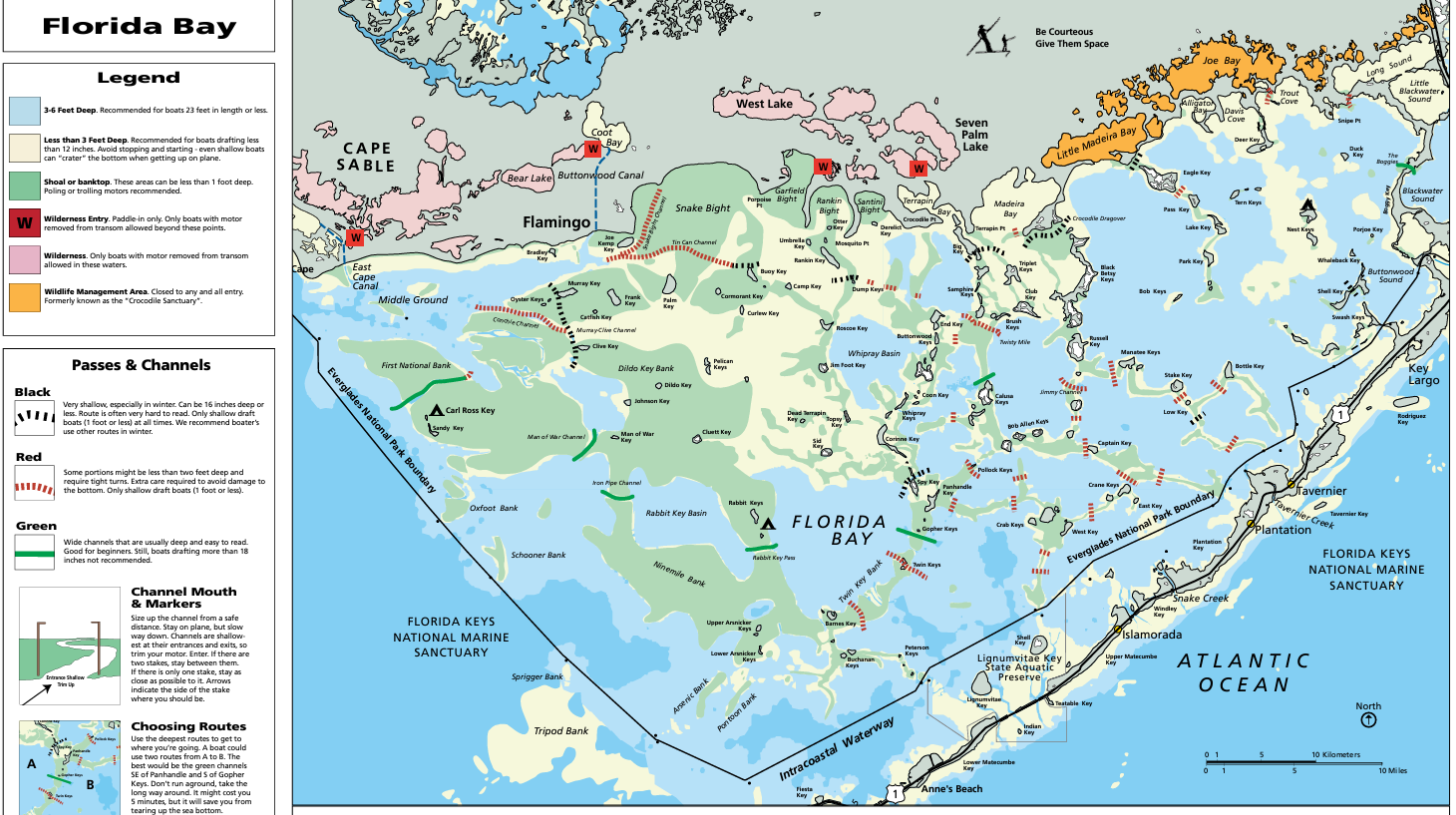
Chart of Florida Bay showing water depths and the shoals and islands that divide it into basins or lakes

Encompassing roughly one-third of Everglades National Park, Florida Bay is variously stated to be 800 square miles (2,100 km^{2}), or 850 square miles (2,200 km^{2}), or 1,000 square miles (2,600 km^{2}). The bay has been described as an inner continental shelf lagoon. The northern edge of the bay is formed by the Florida mainland. The eastern and southern edge of the bay is defined by the Florida Keys, with only a few natural passages between islands connecting to the Atlantic Ocean. The western edge of the bay is defined by the westernmost mud banks of the bay. Nearly all of Florida Bay is included in Everglades National Park. The southern edge, along the Florida Keys, is in the Florida Keys National Marine Sanctuary.

While there is no sharp boundary between Florida Bay and the Gulf of Mexico, the westernmost edge of Florida Bay can be approximated by a line drawn from Long Key to Cape Sable on the mainland, which is very close to the boundary line of Everglades National Park. The northeastern edge of Florida Bay is at Jewfish Creek in Key Largo. Blackwater Sound, southwest of Jewfish Creek, is generally considered part of Florida Bay; Barnes Sound, on the other side of jewfish Creek, is not. Barnes Sound is generally considered part of the Biscayne Bay system.

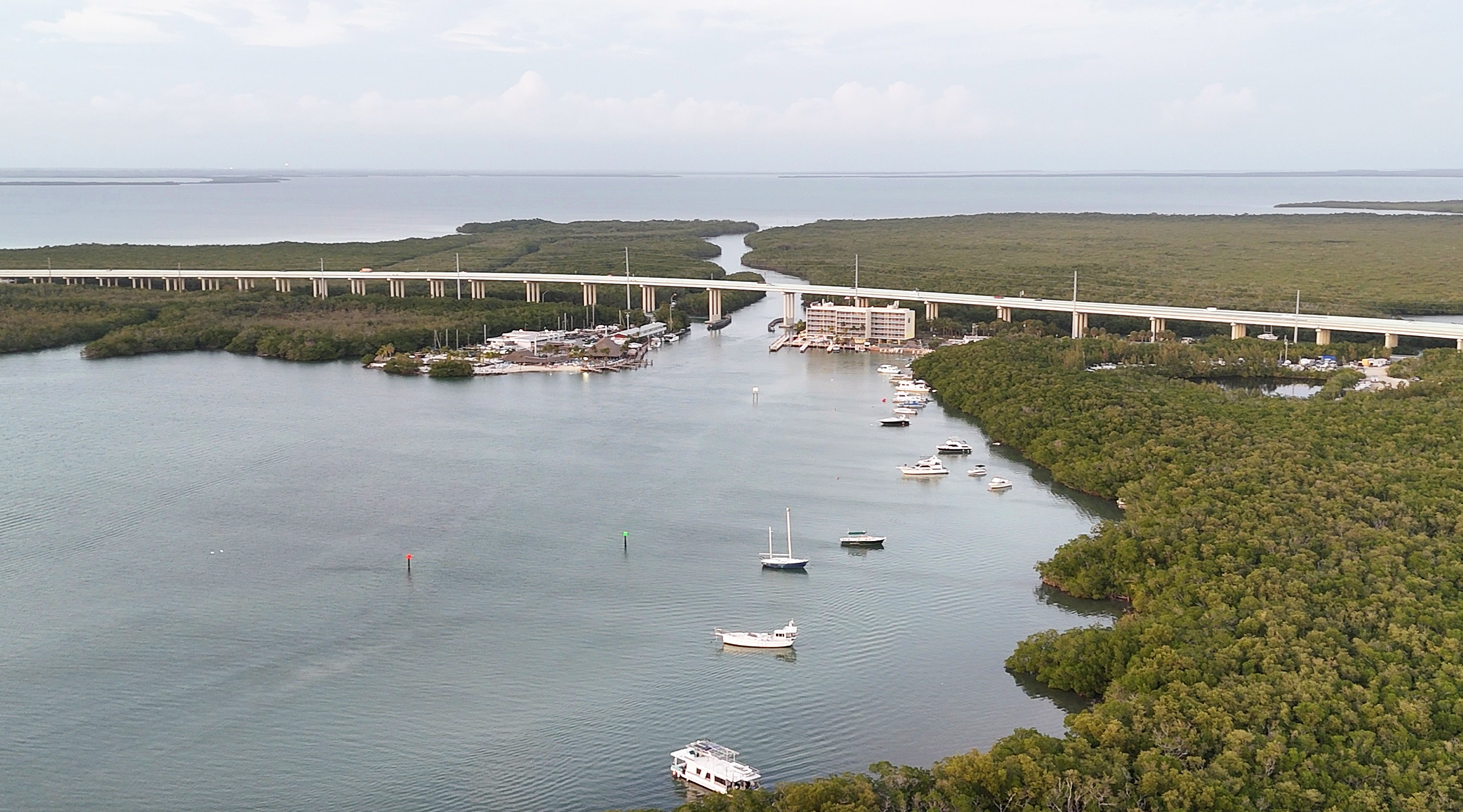
(Looking northeast) Jewfish Creek Bridge at the northeastern end of Florida Bay. Blackwater Sound is in the foreground, and Barnes Sound (not part of Florida Bay) is in the background; Jewfish Creek connects the two.

The bay consists of more than 50 shallow (one to three meters deep) basins or lakes separated by mud banks and mangrove islands. Such basins include: Little Blackwater Sound, Blackwater Sound, Tarpon Basin, Buttonwood Sound, Duck Key Basin, Eagle Key Basin, Madeira Bay, Calusa Key Basin, Crane Key Basin, Rankin Lake, Whipray Basin, Twin Key Basin, Rabbit Key Basin, and Johnson Key Basin.

Water flows between the basins in narrow channels and over the mud banks. The bay is open to the Gulf of Mexico to the west, but connection to the Atlantic Ocean to the east is restricted to narrow channels between the Florida Keys. The average tidal range along the western edge of the bay is 1 to 1.5 meters, but the tidal range diminishes quickly eastward in the bay due to the restricted flow of water between basins. Fresh water flow into the bay is restricted to Taylor Slough and Trout Creek in the northeast corner of the bay, and is only 10% of the freshwater supply to the bay (rainfall provides the rest of the fresh water). Due to the poor circulation of water within the bay, salinity increases rapidly away from the margins of the bay, except for the northeast part of the bay where it receives fresh water from rivers.

=== Temperature ===
Water temperature ranges from 15 to 40 °C (59 to 104 °F) in interior bays. Cold fronts cross the bay 30 to 40 times each year between November and April, rarely lowering the temperature in parts of the bay to below 13 °C (55 °F).

=== Tides ===
Tides in Florida Bay are semi-diurnal, with a range of 60 centimetres (24 in) on the Atlantic side of connecting creeks in the Florida Keys and at Cape Sable. Tidal ranges are less than 15 centimetres (5.9 in) behind the first line of mud banks and absent in the northeast corner of the bay.

=== Salinity ===
Due to the poor circulation of water within the bay, salinity increases rapidly away from the margins of the bay, except for the northeast part of the bay where it receives fresh water from rivers. Salinity is 30% to 40% near the open waters of the continental shelf, while salinity levels range from 4% to 70% in the northeast corner of the bay.

Examination of the paleontology of biota in cores from bay muds in Florida Bay have found that historically the salinity of water in Florida Bay has been primarily dependent on rainfall rather than flow from the Everglades.

Salinity partially controls the occurrence of biota in the bay. The particular species of foraminifera, molluscs, algae, and seagrasses present in the waters of a locality in Florida Bay depend on the salinity. Analysis of core samples extracted from mud banks have provided a record of past salinity levels in a few parts of the bay, going back about two centuries in one case. At a site called Bob Allen in the central part of the bay, sparse seagrass cover was present from the bottom of the core, and the species present indicated a salinity in 18 to 25 parts-per-thousand (ppt) range, (Note: Ocean water is 30 to 35 ppt.) from about 1810, until about 1840. Around 1840, the foraminifera and mollusc species present changed, and vegetation almost completely disappeared from the bottom, indicating a rise in salinity to above 25 ppt. Those conditions continued until about 1910, when the pre-1840 conditions returned, with relatively dense vegetation on the bay floor. The bay floor remains covered with vegetation, but variations in the foraminifera and mollusc species present indicate rapid oscillations in salinity levels since 1940. Around 1970, changes in species and a reduction in the amount of vegetation for a few years indicated a sharp increase in salinity.

A second core from Russell Bank, also in the central part of the bay, goes back to about 1876. Until about 1884, salinity at the location was greater than 25 ppt. From 1884 to about 1900 salinity was below 25 ppt, and below 18 ppt at times. From about 1900 to about 1910 salinity rose above 25 ppt. From 1910 to 1940, salinity was between 18 and 25 ppt. Salinity rose to above 25 ppt around 1940, and stayed there until about 1960, when it fell to between 15 and 25 ppt until 1980. As at the Bob Allen site, there was a brief event around 1970 that severely disrupted the presence of various species at Russell Bank. Around 1980, salinity again rose above 25 ppt.

The 2015 drought period of low precipitation combined with high temperatures and calm winds that produced rapid evaporation caused salinity to increase in the semi-enclosed basins in north-central Florida Bay. Without the freshwater, the water has become stagnant and salty with excess nitrogen from the fertilizer. This hyper-salinity contributes to the massive seagrass die-offs and algal blooms, and kills submerged aquatic vegetation.

== Geology ==
Florida Bay is underlain by a flat oolitic limestone bedrock, the Miami Limestone. The top of the bedrock is about 1 metre (3 ft 3 in) below sea level in the northeast corner of the bay, and slopes to 2 to 3 metres (6 ft 7 in to 9 ft 10 in) below sea level in the southwest. Isolated high spots occur at East Key, Arsnicker Key, and Lignumvitae Key, which are underlain by patches of Pleistocene coral. The Miami Limestone under Florida Bay ranges in thickness from about 3 metres (9.8 ft) at Cape Sable to up to 12 metres (39 ft) along the Florida Keys, and 35 metres (115 ft) at Key West, and is underlain by the Fort Thompson Formation.

The Miami Limestone of Florida Bay formed during the Sangamon interglacial between the most recent glacial period, the Wisconsin, and the preceding Illinoian, centered on about 125,000 years ago. The sea level stood higher then than at present, covering much of what is now southern Florida. A coral reef grew on the eastern edge of the Florida platform, while the shallow, protected waters west of the reef formed oolites or hosted large fields of bryozoans.

=== Origin ===
Throughout the Wisconsin glaciation the sea level was much lower than today and the area that is now Florida Bay was dry land. As the glaciation ended with the Pleistocene period, the sea level rose rapidly, only slowing down about 7,000 years ago as the sea level reached about 8 metres (26 ft) below the late 20th century level. Sea level continued to rise thereafter at an average rate of about 11 centimetres (4.3 in) per century. During the last 6,000 to 7,000 years a wet climate allowed sawgrass-dominated wetlands resembling the Everglades to develop on the land that is now under Florida Bay. Between 3,000 and 5,000 years ago, the continued rise of the sea level flooded the gently sloping southernmost part of the Everglades to form Florida Bay.

There are tree islands throughout the Everglades, clusters of trees growing on slight elevations. Tree islands accumulate plant litter which becomes peat, which in turn facilitates the creation of caliche, a dense limestone crust on the limestone bedrock. As the bay flooded, a layer of grey to black calcium carbonate mud, rich in hydrogen sulfide, formed on the bottom. The mud layer is thicker on islands covered by mangroves, and in banks connecting the islands. Peat and caliche remnants from the Everglades tree islands remain under the islands and banks.

=== Mud mounds ===
As the rising sea level flooded the area that is now Florida Bay between 3,000 and 5,000 years ago, peat deposits from tree islands, shore levees, and irregularities in the bedrock surface served as nuclei for mud banks. The mud mounds (islands and banks) of Florida Bay, which divide the bay into many basins or lakes, are subject to various processes that degrade, move, and built the mounds. These processes are dependent on the production of carbonate, which occurs at different rates across the bay. Carbonate is produced at high enough rates in the more open (western) part of the bay for mud mounds to acquire sediment, and have grown together to form large structures, while mounds in the central part of the bay can grow only by the movement of sediment from the bottoms of basins onto the mounds. Mounds in the inner part of the bay are smaller, and grow slowly because of low production rates of carbonate. The growth and development of mud banks is controlled by biological processes, including the baffling of water movement and binding of sediment by seagrasses.

Mud banks in the central part of the bay tend to run in a northwest to southeast direction, corresponding to the direction of approach of cold fronts across the bay. The mud bank called Upper Cross Bank is 4 kilometres (2.5 mi) long and 400 to 700 metres (1,300 to 2,300 ft) wide. Upper Cross Bank is eroding on the windward (east) side at a rate of 20 centimetres (7.9 in) vertically and 2 to 3 metres (6 ft 7 in to 9 ft 10 in) laterally over five years, while the leeward (west) side is growing at a rate of 10 centimetres (3.9 in) vertically and 10 to 20 metres (33 to 66 ft) laterally over the same five years.

Mud mounds are made up of facies, thin layers of different types of rock. The lowest facies of Upper Cross Bank, 15 to 25 centimetres (5.9 to 9.8 in) thick, is a basal packstone, which is also found widely on the bottom of basins in the bay. The packstone resembles stone that commonly forms on limestone at the bottom of lakes. The presence of remnants of the algae Halimeda in the packstone may indicate that it formed when the bay was more open. Mud mounds appear to be migrating over the basal packstone in the basins. The basal packstone in the basins has also been reworked by hurricanes.

== Flora and fauna ==
The bay's many basins that are broken up by banks serve as plentiful fishing grounds for snook (Centropomus undecimalis), redfish (Sciaenops ocellatus), spotted seatrout (Cynoscion nebulosus), tarpon (Megaflops atlanticus), bonefish (Albula vulpes), and permit (Trichinous falcatus), among others.

The bay is home to many species of wading birds. Most notably, Roseate spoonbills (Platalea ajaja), Reddish egrets (Egretta rufescens), and Great White Herons (Ardea herodias occidentalis) have unique subpopulations that are largely restricted to Florida Bay. Other bird species include Bald eagles, seagulls, pelicans, sandpipers, cormorants, ospreys, and flamingos.

Bay land animals include raccoons, opossums, bobcats, and fox squirrels.

== Environmental issues ==
Florida Bay has undergone a series of ecological changes beginning in the late 1980s that have severely altered the ecosystem. Originally, clean freshwater flowed south through the state into the Florida Bay. To support the state's agricultural water needs, namely for sugar cultivation, the water was rerouted and no longer flows into the Bay. The flow of fresh water is believed to have caused environmental issues and loss of native wildlife.

=== Seagrass die-off ===
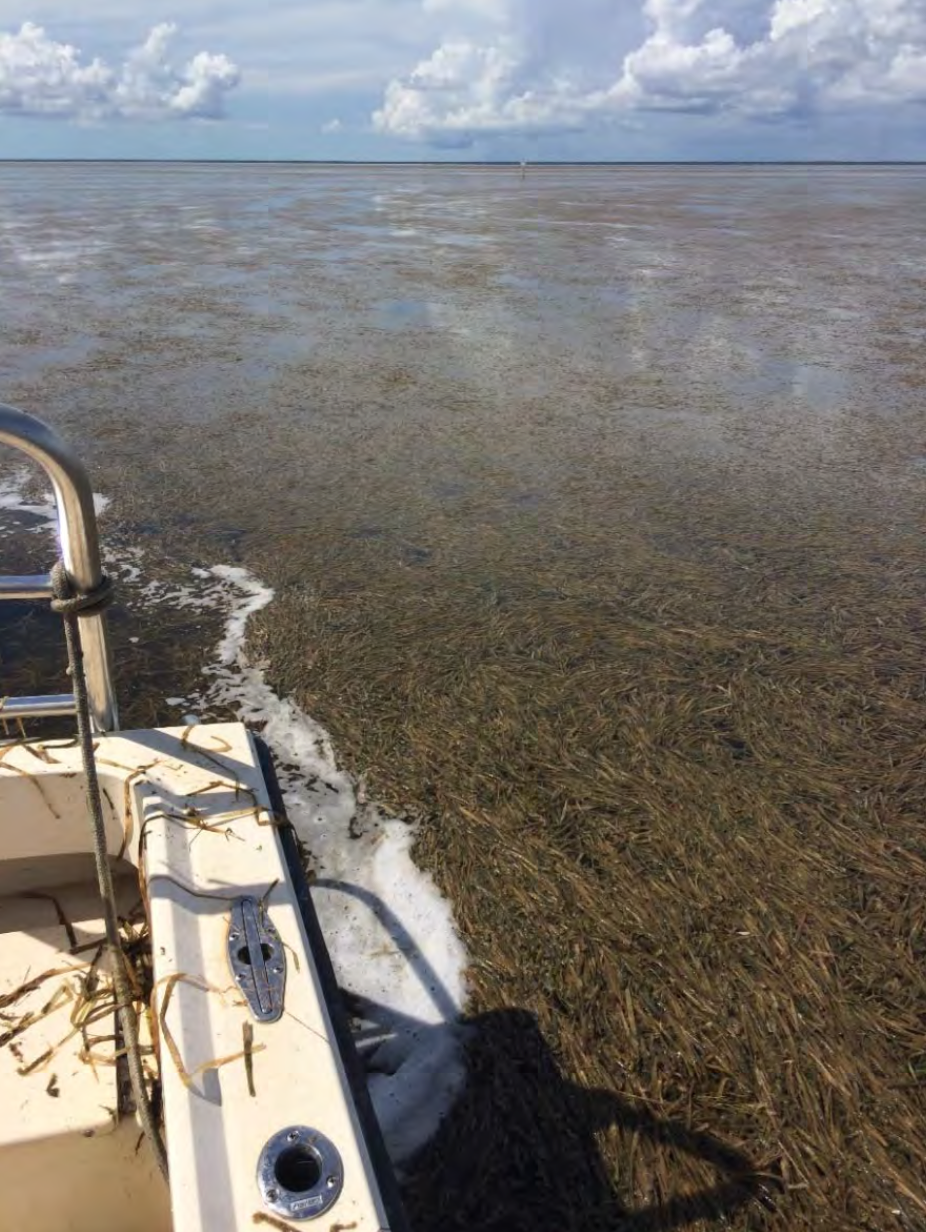
Rafts of dead seagrass in Florida Bay. 2015.

The rerouting of the flow of freshwater to the Bay coupled with periods of drought have caused massive seagrass die-offs. The first major die-off occurred from 1987 to 1991 as thousands of hectares of turtlegrass beds (Thalassia testudinum) were devastated by high levels of toxic dissolved sulfide. 10,000 acres died in the central and western bay, and almost 60,000 additional acres suffered reduced productivity and biomass as a result. Then, following the 2015 drought, extreme temperatures and heightened salinity reduced the amount of oxygen that could remain dissolved in the water, causing periods of anoxia during nighttime and thereby damaging the health of the turtlegrass in the bay. During the summer and fall of 2015, approximately 40,000 acres of seagrass died.

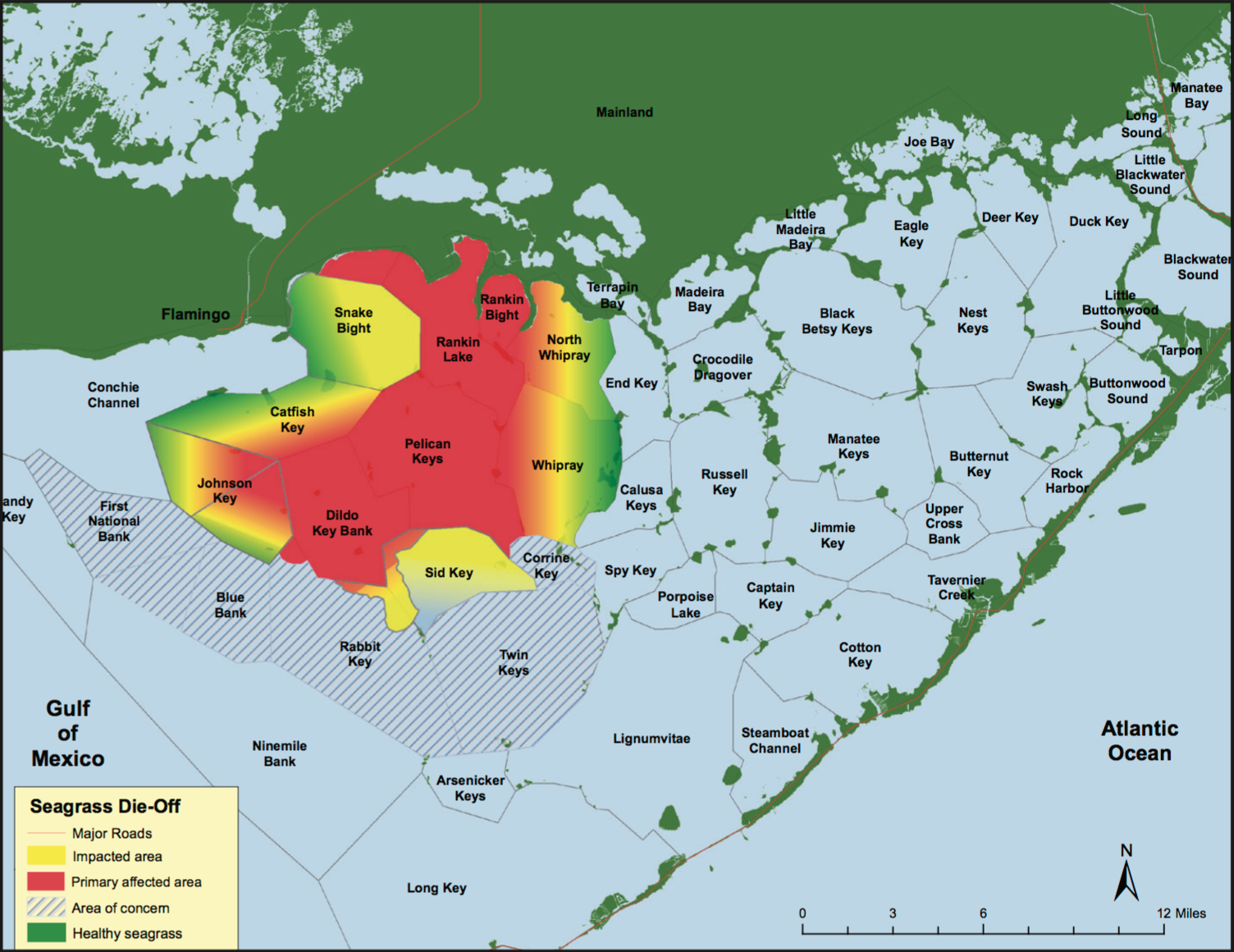
Red = area containing dead turtle grass in patches of varying size; not 100% dead. Yellow = mixed live/dead impacted areas. Green = healthy turtle grass. Striped area = dense seagrass most at risk of die-off expansion.

=== Algae blooms ===
Cyanobacterial harmful algae blooms (also known as blue-green algae) have flourished in the bay due to a variety of environmental stressors: Agricultural fertilizer run-off increases nutrients in the delicately balanced environment and the excess increases the bacteria's rate of growth; The newly hyper-saline environment provides an ideal breeding ground for cyanobacteria; Rafts of dead seagrass floating on the surface of the water as well as decaying on the bay bottom leads to anoxia and in turn, algal blooms.

Blue-green algae causes numerous severe health consequences for the marine ecosystem as well surrounding human populations. Blooms result in reduced dissolved oxygen concentrations, alterations in aquatic food webs, algal scum lining the shores, the production of compounds that cause distasteful drinking water and fish flesh, and the production of toxins severe enough to poison aquatic as well as terrestrial organisms. Blooms have been reported throughout the continental United States, and resulting cyanotoxins have been associated with human and animal illness and death in at least 43 states. Most cyanobacteria produce the neurotoxin beta-N-methylamino-l-alanine (BMAA) that has been implicated as a significant environmental risk in the development of neurodegenerative diseases such as Alzheimer's disease, Parkinson's disease, and amyotrophic lateral sclerosis (ALS). The cyanobacteria has also been linked to liver cancer, chronic fatigue illness, skin rashes, abdominal cramps, nausea, diarrhea and vomiting.

The 2002 algal bloom in the central portion of the Florida Bay was associated with high concentrations of dissolved organic nitrogen and organic phosphorus, whereas the eastern bay regions bloom was associated with high concentration of inorganic nutrients.

=== Loss of native wildlife ===
By the mid 1930s, the three main species of wading birds in the bay (Roseate spoonbills, Reddish egrets, Great herons) were driven to near extinction by human harvesting for food and feathers.

The cyanobacteria create an oxygen-free environment teaming with toxic gases, creating an unsuitable living environment for many marine and terrestrial animal species. As a result, seasons during which algal blooms flourish cause a temporary loss in wildlife.

Spotted seatrout populations in the coasted Everglades are declining. As the second most commonly caught species of fish in the Florida Bay, spotted seatrout comprise a large portion of the fishing industry and are integral to the ecosystem as well as surrounding economy. Water temperature of less than 80 °F (27 °C) and salinity levels below 37.5 parts per thousand (ppt) are ideal for seatrout spawning; however, water management stations in the Everglades and Florida Bay reported salinity levels of 64.4 ppt in July 2015 and recorded water temperatures of up to 92 °F (33 °C). These environmental conditions are far from ideal for the seatrout and add additional difficulties for the survival of juveniles as well as important prey such as larval shrimp and small fish.

== Economy ==
The bay is an economic and environmental asset. As of 2017, the recreational fishing industry in Florida Bay had an estimated value of $7.1 billion, and generated $73 million in federal, state and local taxes annually, while the bay's commercial fishing industry had an estimated value of $400 million, and generated $3 million in taxes.

== Water management projects ==
Various projects are funded by the government in an attempt to manage the hydrology issues present in the Florida Bay, including the C-111 South Dade, Modified Water Deliveries, and C-111 Spreader Canal Western Project from the Comprehensive Everglades Restoration Plan (CERP). These projects seek to distribute more freshwater into the sloughs but do not deliver additional water to the bay.

== Navigation ==
The U.S. Atlantic Intracoastal Waterway goes through Florida Bay, generally following the southern boundary of the Everglades National Park. Florida Bay is a Marine protected area designated as a "Particularly Sensitive Sea Area" by the International Maritime Organization in 2002. Boating in Florida Bay off the Intracoastal Waterway is considered challenging, because of shallow depths, mud, and seagrass.

== Sources ==
- Bosence, D. W. J. (1995). "Anatomy of a Recent Biodetrital Mud-Mound, Florida Bay, USA". In Monty, C. L. V.; Bosence, D. W. J.; Bridges, P. H.; Pratt, B. R. (eds.). Carbonate Mud-Mounds: Their Origins and Evolution. Wiley Online Books. pp. 475–493. doi:10.1002/9781444304114.ch17. ISBN 9781444304114.
- Brewster-Wingard, G. L.; Ishman, S. E.; Holmes, S. E. (Spring 1998). "Environmental Impacts on the Southern Florida Coastal Waters: A History of Change in Florida Bay". Journal of Coastal Research. 26: 162–172. Bibcode:1998JCRes..26..162W. JSTOR 25736133.
- Holmquist, Jeff G.; Powell, George V.; Sogard, Susan M. (January 1989). "Sediment, Water Level and Water Temperature Characteristics of Florida Bay's Grass-Covered Mud Banks". Bulletin of Marine Sciences. 44 (1): 348–364 – via Ingentaconnect.
- Lodge, Thomas E. (2019). "Overview of the Everglades". In Pollman, D.; Rumbold, C.; Axelrad, D. (eds.). Mercury and the Everglades. A Synthesis and Model for Complex Ecosystem Restoration. Springer. pp. 1–35. doi:10.1007/978-3-030-20070-1_1. ISBN 978-3-030-20070-1.
- Mitchell-Tapping, Hugh J. (Spring 1980). "Depositional History of the Oolite of the Miami Limestone Formation". Florida Scientist. 43 (2): 116–125. JSTOR 24319647.
- Shinn, Eugene A.; Lidz, Barbara H. (2018). Geology of the Florida Keys. Gainesville, Florida: University Press of Florida. ISBN 978-0-8130-5651-7.
- "Got Trout? Spotted seatrout vanishing from Florida Bay". Everglades Foundation. Archived from the original on September 10, 2015.
- National Park Service (May 2016). "2015 Florida Bay Seagrass Die-Off" (PDF). NPS.gov. Archived from the original (PDF) on December 15, 2016.
- "Florida Bay: What is The Solution?". Everglades Foundation. Archived from the original on July 31, 2020.
- OCS (June 1983). Fowey Rocks to American Shoal (Chart 11450) (Navigation chart). 1:180,000. United States Department of Commerce, National Oceanic and Atmospheric Administration.
- Wanless, Harold R.; Tagett, Matthew G. (January 1989). "Origin, Growth and Evolution of Carbonate Mudbanks in Florida Bay". Bulletin of Marine Science. 44 (1): 454–489 – via Ingentaconnect.
