= Jewfish, Florida =

- Unincorporated community
- Location within Florida Location within the United States
- Coordinates: 25.184°N 80.388°W
- Country: United States
- State: Florida
- County: Monroe
- Elevation: 3.3 ft (1 m)
- Time zone: UTC-5 (Eastern (EST))
  - Summer (DST): UTC-4 (EDT)

Jewfish is an unincorporated community in Monroe County, Florida, United States. It is located in the upper Florida Keys on Key Largo off U.S. Route 1 (Overseas Highway). It is just west of the census-designated place (CDP) of North Key Largo.

It has a hotel, restaurant, and marina.

== History ==
A post office called Jewfish was established in 1912, and remained in operation until it was discontinued in 1921. The community took its name from the jewfish, a type of saltwater fish considered a delicacy.

Jewfish is adjacent to Jewfish Creek, an inlet which is spanned by Jewfish Creek Bridge. In 2002, Monroe County commissioners unanimously declined to rename the inlet.

== Geography ==
Jewfish is located at 25.184°N 80.388°W at an elevation of 3 feet (1 m).
