= Sandspur Island =

Spoil island in Biscayne Bay in Southern Florida

Coordinates: 25°54′03″N 80°8′07.3″W

Sandspur Island (also known as Beer Can Island) is the largest spoil island in Biscayne Bay, which is part of the Oleta River State Park in Southern Florida. The island is 15 acres (6.1 ha), the largest island in North Bay of the Biscayne Bay and only accessible by boat.

In the early 1900s dredging of Biscayne Bay to create navigation channels and harbors resulted in the creation of over twenty man-made spoil islands, including Sandspur Island and two partially filled natural mangrove islands.

== Ecology ==
The island has a diverse range of plant and animal life, including wild raccoons. There is a tidal swamp in the south of the island. The island is abundant with coconut palm trees. The island also appears to have a number of distinct habitats. In the north, there are coconut trees, mangrove trees, various deciduous trees, flowering plants, and occasional clearings. In 1993, the island underwent ecological restoration through replanting native maritime hammock plant species.

In the south, there are last remnants of the Australian pine, Casuarina, an invasive introduced species that had once taken over the island. There are two distinct patches of these trees remaining. One in the south east part of the island, and the second around a small pond in the southern part of the island. There is also a swampy area near the creek.

Along the eastern coast there are rocks (placed to resist erosion) and mangrove trees which grow in pools of water that slip past the rocks. There is also a small beach area.
