= Arsenicker Keys =

Islands in southern Florida, USA

The Arsenicker Keys or Arsnicker Keys may refer to any one of three groups of islands in southern Florida, in the United States. "Arsenicker", or "Arsnicker", is a corruption of "Marsh sneaker", a name used by Bahamians for the great blue heron.

== In Biscayne Bay ==
The Arsenicker Keys (25.3939°N 80.2978°W) are a group of islands at the southern end of Biscayne Bay in Miami-Dade County. They are located within Biscayne National Park. The group includes:

- Arsenicker Key. (25.3971°N 80.2864°W) The island was formerly called North Arsnicker Key.
- East Arsenicker Key. (25.3759°N 80.2884°W)
- Long Arsenicker Key. (25.3804°N 80.2953°W)
- West Arsenicker Key. (25.4053°N 80.3017°W)

Ibis, herons, and cormorants nest on the Arsenicker keys, and frigatebirds roost there seasonally. Arsenicker Key and West Arsenicker Key, and the waters out to 300 feet surrounding those islands, are closed to all entry by the public to protect the nesting sites. East Arsenicker Key and Long Arsenicker Key are submerged at high tide.

== In Florida Bay ==
The Upper Arsnicker Keys (24.9315°N 80.8278°W) are a group of islands in Florida Bay, in Monroe County, seven miles north of Long Key in the Florida Keys. The island group was known as the Cooper Islands in the 18th century. The group includes Center Key. The Lower Arsnicker Keys (24.9207°N 80.8267°W) are another group of islands in Florida Bay. A survey in the late 1970s found nesting colonies of brown pelicans and double-crested cormorants on the Upper Arsnicker Keys and of laughing gulls on the Lower Arsicker Keys. Brown pelicans were observed nesting on the Lower Arshicker Keys in the late 1960s and early 1970s, but were absent from 1972 until 1982.
