= Jewfish Creek Bridge =

Bridge in Florida, United States of America

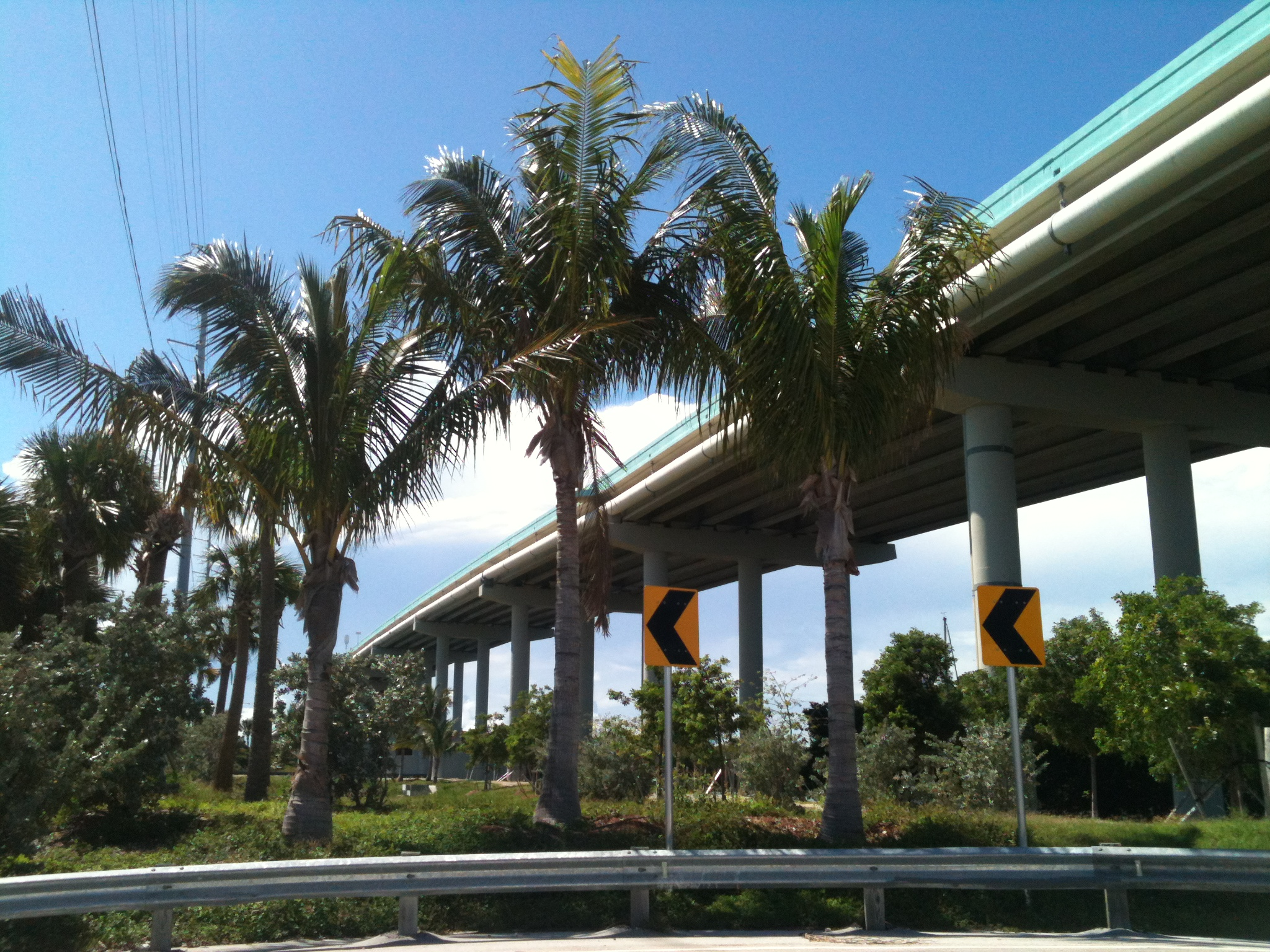
- Coordinates: 25°10′53″N 80°23′00″W
- Carries: US 1 (Overseas Highway)
- Crosses: Jewfish Creek; Lake Surprise
- Locale: Key Largo, Florida
- Official name: Jewfish Creek Bridge
- Maintained by: Florida Department of Transportation

Characteristics
- Design: Concrete Girder Bridge
- Clearance above: 65 Feet

History
- Opened: 1944 (original bridge); May 22, 2008 (current bridge)

Statistics
- Toll: None

Location
- Interactive map of Jewfish Creek Bridge

The Jewfish Creek Bridge is a beam bridge in the Florida Keys. Spanning both Jewfish Creek and Lake Surprise, it carries the Overseas Highway (U.S. Route 1) between the Florida Keys and the Florida mainland. The bridge is 65 feet (20 m) tall and opened in 2008, replacing a small drawbridge.

== History ==
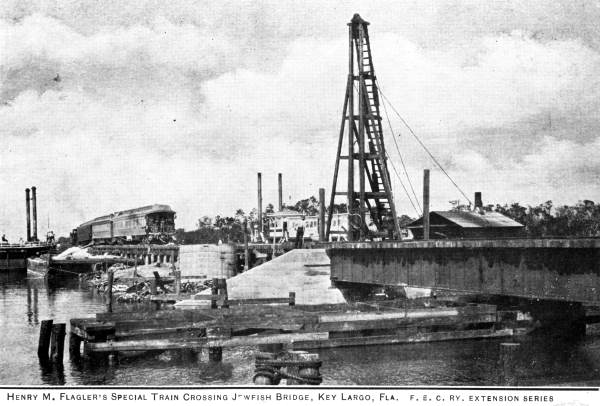
Henry Flagler's private rail car, Rambler, crossing Jewfish Creek on the Overseas Railroad

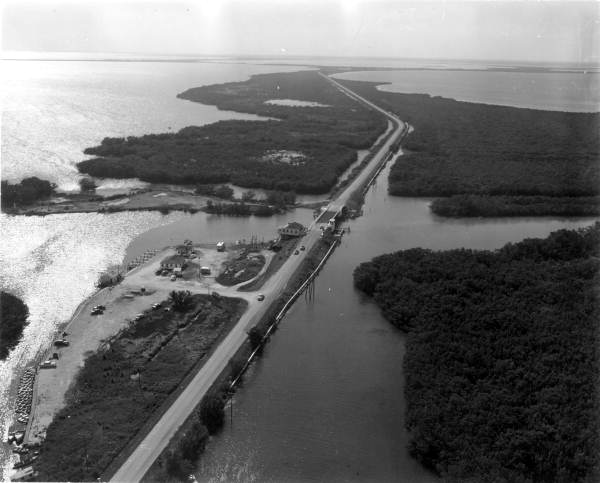
Jewfish Creek Drawbridge (1944-2008)

The original Jewfish Creek beam bridge opened for traffic in 1944 along with the current stretch of the Overseas Highway between Florida City and Key Largo (locally known as the 18 Mile Stretch). Prior to this, the Overseas Highway was connected to the mainland via the nearby Card Sound Bridge (which at the time was also a small drawbridge). The current route was built along the original right of way of the Overseas Railroad, which shortened the driving distance between Florida City and Key Largo by nearly 14 miles (23 km). The United States Navy, which continues to have a large presence in Key West, sought an improved access to the mainland during World War II, which is the reason the Overseas Highway was rerouted onto the former railroad right of way.

The original Card Sound Bridge was closed to vehicular traffic after the completion of the Jewfish Creek Bridge and its remains were destroyed by a fire shortly afterward. The current Card Sound Bridge opened in 1969, restoring the original route and giving the Florida Keys two vehicular accesses to the mainland.

The Jewfish Creek drawbridge was replaced by the current bridge on May 22, 2008, as a part of larger $300 million project to reconstruct the entire stretch of U.S. 1 between Florida City and Key Largo. In addition to the drawbridge, the current bridge allowed for the removal of the Lake Surprise Causeway, which dated back to the days of the railroad, restoring the natural water flow into Florida Bay. The project also included the addition of a jersey barrier between the northbound and southbound lanes throughout, passing lanes in various locations, and the replacement of the non-functional C-111 canal drawbridge with a small fixed bridge.

== Features ==
The current structure is 65 feet (20 m) tall. It carries two lanes separated by a Jersey barrier, and also features outside berms to prevent road pollutants from entering Florida Bay. Although the bridge bypasses the community of Jewfish, which is home to a marina and other businesses, exit ramps exist off of the main bridge provide access to Jewfish. The side and median barriers of the bridge are painted "Belize Blue," which was recommended by marine artist Robert Wyland.

== Gallery ==
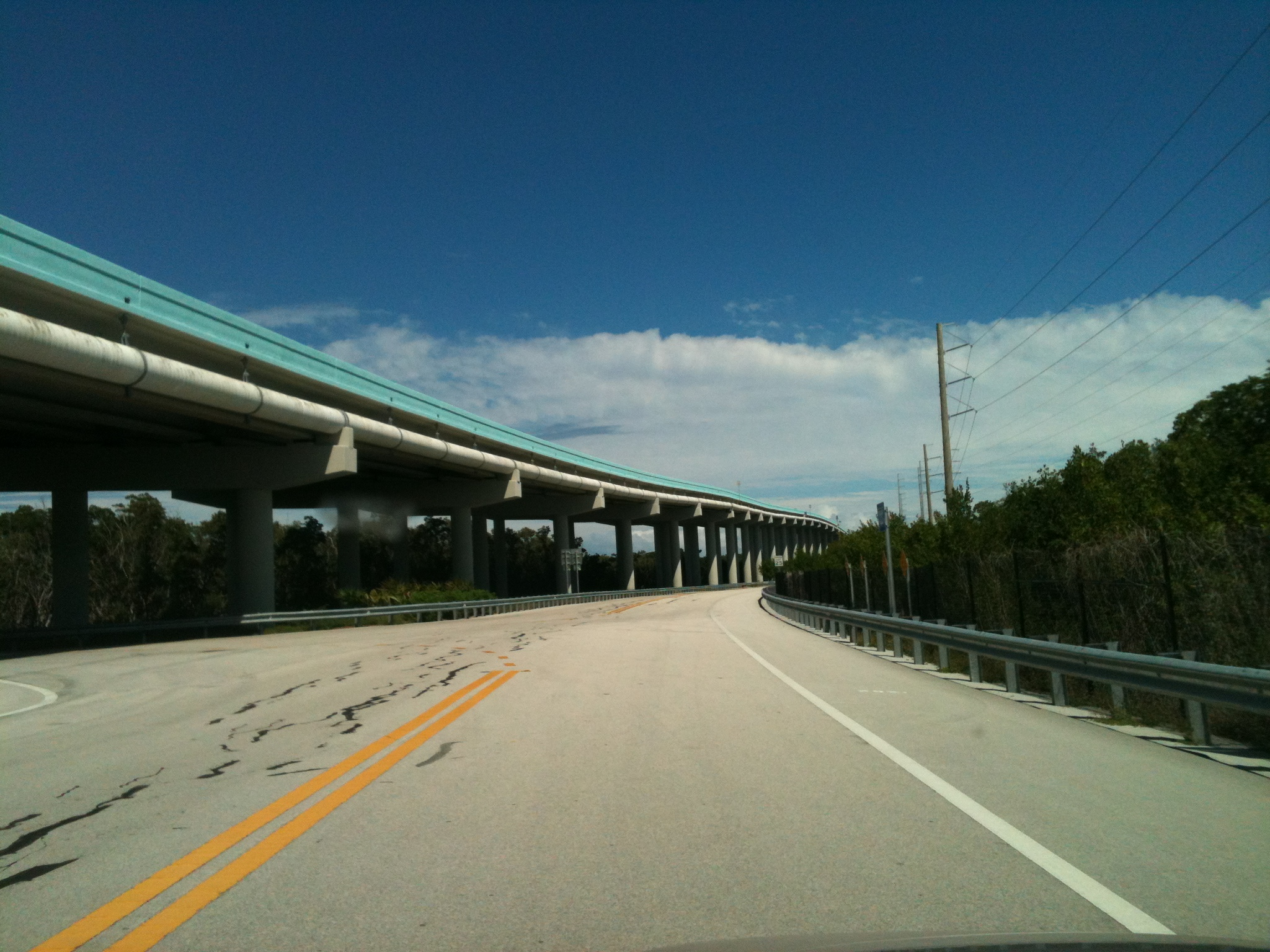
North side of the bridge

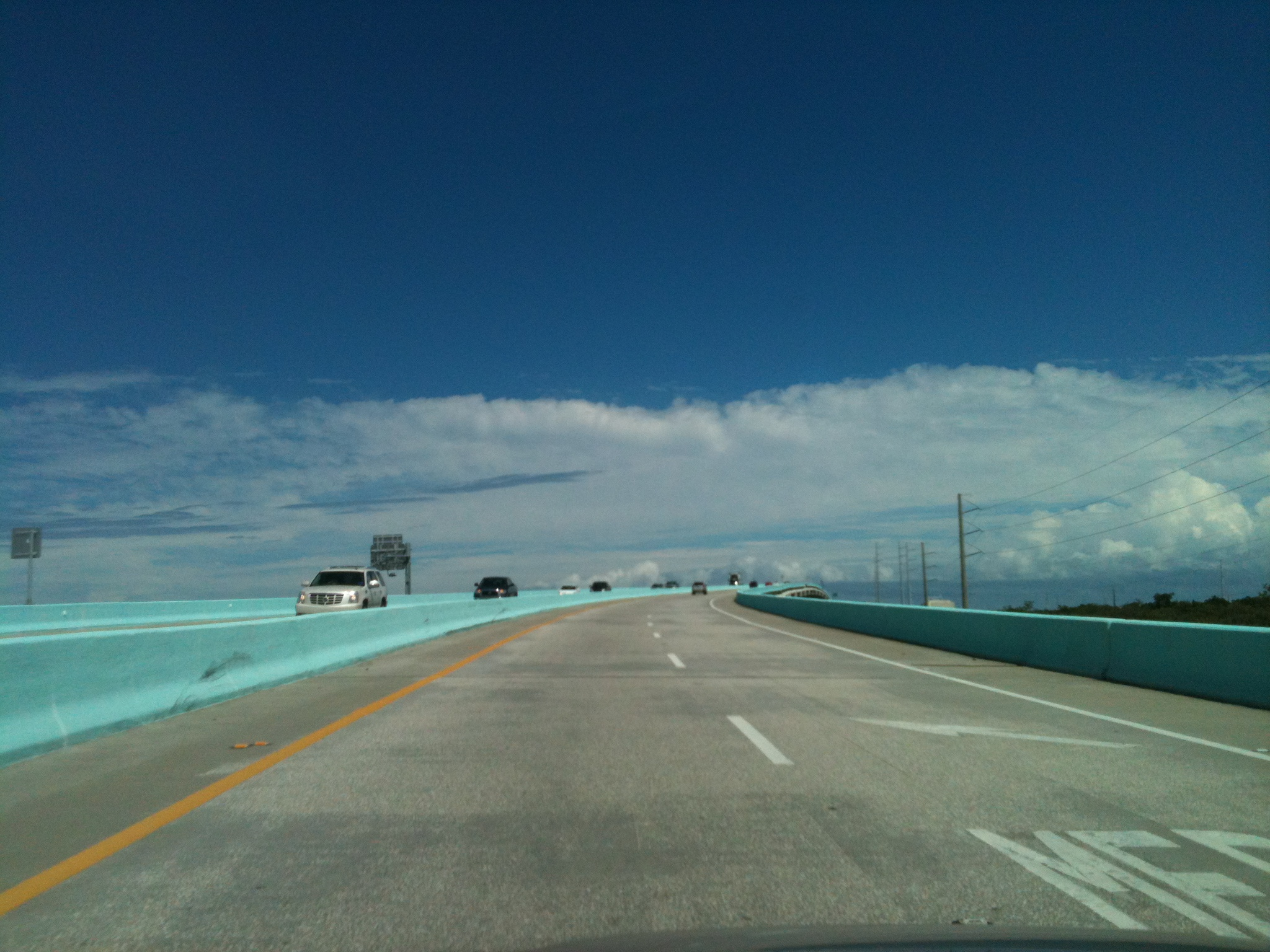
Top of the bridge

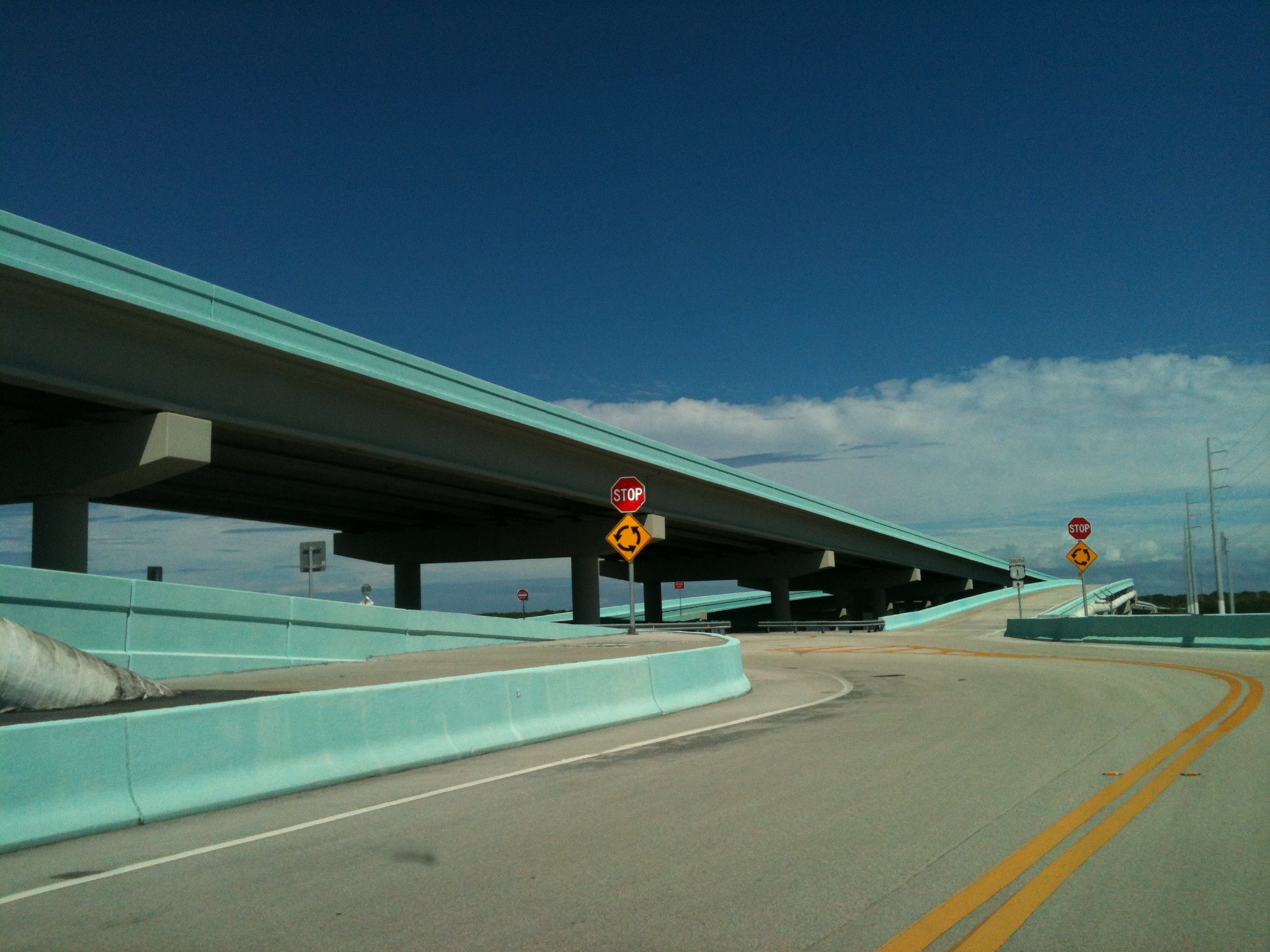
Exit ramps connecting area between Jewfish Creek and Lake Surprise
