= Barnes Sound =

Florida sound

- Location within Florida
- Location: Florida, US
- Coordinates: 25°14′28″N 80°22′43″W
- Type: Bay

Barnes Sound is a bay located at the southern tip of Florida, between Key Largo and the mainland. It has been described as part of Biscayne Bay or of the Biscayne Bay System.

Two United States Navy warships have been named after the sound. See USS Barnes
