= National Register of Historic Places listings in Big Cypress National Preserve =

This is a list of the National Register of Historic Places listings in Big Cypress National Preserve.

This is intended to be a complete list of the properties and districts on the National Register of Historic Places in Big Cypress National Preserve, Florida, United States. The locations of National Register properties and districts for which the latitude and longitude coordinates are included below, may be seen in a Google map.

There are nine properties and districts listed on the National Register in the park.

This National Park Service list is complete through NPS recent listings posted November 13, 2025.

== Current listings ==
| | Name on the Register | Image | Date listed | Location | City or town | Description |
|---|---|---|---|---|---|---|
| 1 | Burns Lake Site (8CR259) | | May 27, 1986 (#86001192) | Address Restricted | Ochopee | |
| 2 | Halfway Creek Site | | August 15, 1980 (#80000365) | Address Restricted | Carnestown | |
| 3 | Hinson Mounds | | December 29, 1978 (#78000345) | Address Restricted | Miles City | |
| 4 | C. J. Ostl Site | | December 15, 1978 (#78003380) | Address Restricted | Ochopee | |
| 5 | Platt Island | | December 14, 1978 (#78000934) | Northeast of Miles City off State Road 29; 26°12′46″N 81°18′15″W | Miles City | |
| 6 | Plaza Site (8CR303) | | May 28, 1986 (#86001196) | Address Restricted | Ochopee | |
| 7 | Sugar Pot Site | | December 15, 1978 (#78000264) | Address Restricted | Ochopee | |
| 8 | Turner River Site | | December 14, 1978 (#78000263) | Address Restricted | Ochopee | |

== Former listings ==
| | Name on the Register | Image | Date listed | Date removed | Location | City or town | Description |
|---|---|---|---|---|---|---|---|
| 1 | Monroe Station (Ochopee, Florida) | Monroe Station (Ochopee, Florida) | May 11, 2000 (#00000427) | May 15, 2019 | Junction of the Tamiami Trail and Loop Road; 25°51′46″N 81°06′01″W | Ochopee | Destroyed by fire |

== See also ==
- National Register of Historic Places listings in Collier County, Florida
- National Register of Historic Places listings in Florida
