= National Register of Historic Places listings in Collier County, Florida =

Location of Collier County in Florida

This is a list of the National Register of Historic Places listings in Collier County, Florida.

This is intended to be a complete list of the properties and districts on the National Register of Historic Places in Collier County, Florida, United States. The locations of National Register properties and districts for which the latitude and longitude coordinates are included below, may be seen in a map.

There are 19 properties and districts listed on the National Register in the county.

This National Park Service list is complete through NPS recent listings posted November 13, 2025.

Contents: Counties in Florida (non-linked contain no National Register listings)
Alachua - Baker - Bay - Bradford - Brevard - Broward - Calhoun - Charlotte - Citrus - Clay - Collier - Columbia - DeSoto - Dixie - Duval - Escambia - Flagler - Franklin - Gadsden - Gilchrist - Glades - Gulf - Hamilton - Hardee - Hendry - Hernando - Highlands - Hillsborough (Tampa) - Holmes - Indian River - Jackson - Jefferson - Lafayette - Lake - Lee - Leon - Levy - Liberty - Madison - Manatee - Marion - Martin - Miami-Dade (Miami) - Monroe - Nassau - Okaloosa - Okeechobee - Orange - Osceola - Palm Beach - Pasco - Pinellas - Polk - Putnam - St. Johns - St. Lucie - Santa Rosa - Sarasota - Seminole - Sumter - Suwannee - Taylor - Union - Volusia - Wakulla - Walton - Washington

== Current listings ==
	Name on the Register	Image	Date listed	Location	City or town	Description
1	Bank of Everglades Building	Bank of Everglades Building	July 15, 1999 (#99000825)	201 West Broadway; 25°51′27″N 81°23′13″W	Everglades City	
2	Bay City Walking Dredge	Bay City Walking Dredge	May 29, 2013 (#13000318)	20200 E. Tamiami Trail; 25°59′31″N 81°35′36″W	Naples	On display at Collier-Seminole State Park.
3	Burns Lake Site (8CR259)		May 27, 1986 (#86001192)	Address Restricted	Ochopee	
4	Everglades Laundry	Everglades Laundry	September 22, 2001 (#01001012)	105 West Broadway; 25°51′24″N 81°23′08″W	Everglades City	
5	Halfway Creek Site		August 15, 1980 (#80000365)	Address Restricted	Carnestown	
6	Hinson Mounds		December 29, 1978 (#78000345)	Address Restricted	Miles City	
7	Capt. John Foley Horr House	Capt. John Foley Horr House	October 8, 1997 (#97001215)	Northern side of Whiskey Creek Drive; 25°54′12″N 81°41′16″W	Key Marco	
8	Keewaydin Club	Keewaydin Club	December 22, 1987 (#87001979)	Northern end of Key Island; 26°05′23″N 81°48′02″W	Naples	
9	Naples Historic District	Naples Historic District	December 17, 1987 (#87002179)	Roughly bounded by Ninth Avenue South, Third Street, Thirteenth Avenue South, and the Gulf of Mexico; 26°08′00″N 81°48′17″W	Naples	
10	Old Collier County Courthouse	Old Collier County Courthouse	December 3, 2013 (#13000875)	102 Copeland Ave., N. 25°51′27″N 81°23′05″W	Everglades City	
11	C. J. Ostl Site		December 15, 1978 (#78003380)	Address Restricted	Ochopee	
12	Palm Cottage	Palm Cottage	May 24, 1982 (#82002371)	137 12th Avenue, South; 26°07′54″N 81°48′15″W	Naples	
13	Platt Island	Platt Island	December 14, 1978 (#78000934)	Northeast of Miles City off State Road 29; 26°12′46″N 81°18′15″W	Miles City	
14	Plaza Site (8CR303)		May 28, 1986 (#86001196)	Address Restricted	Ochopee	
15	Roberts Ranch	Roberts Ranch	October 4, 2003 (#03000990)	1215 Roberts Avenue; 26°25′15″N 81°25′54″W	Immokalee	
16	Seaboard Coast Line Railroad Depot	Seaboard Coast Line Railroad Depot	September 10, 1974 (#74000613)	1051 5th Avenue, South; 26°08′33″N 81°47′36″W	Naples	
17	Ted Smallwood Store	Ted Smallwood Store	July 24, 1974 (#74000612)	State Road 29 in Everglades National Park; 25°48′34″N 81°21′45″W	Chokoloskee	
18	Sugar Pot Site		December 15, 1978 (#78000264)	Address Restricted	Ochopee	
19	Turner River Site		December 14, 1978 (#78000263)	Address Restricted	Ochopee	

== Former listings ==
	Name on the Register	Image	Date listed	Date removed	Location	City or town	Description
1	Monroe Station (Ochopee, Florida)	Monroe Station (Ochopee, Florida)	May 11, 2000 (#00000427)	May 15, 2019	Junction of the Tamiami Trail and Loop Road; 25°51′46″N 81°06′01″W	Ochopee	Destroyed by fire

== See also ==
- List of National Historic Landmarks in Florida
- National Register of Historic Places listings in Florida
