= Glades culture =

Archaeological culture in Florida, USA

The Glades culture is an archaeological culture in southernmost Florida that lasted from about 500 BCE until shortly after European contact. The people in the culture area were hunter-gatherers with some semi-permanent villages. At the time of European contact, the people of the Glades culture area included the Tequesta people, who lived along the southernmost Atlantic Coast of Florida, in the Everglades, and likely in the Florida Keys, and the Jaega people, who lived along the Atlantic Coast north of the Tequesta. The Muspa people lived on Marco Island in the northern Ten Thousand Islands, which had been part of the Glades culture area until about 1300, when Glades-style pottery and other artifacts found at the Muspa site were replaced by ones similar to those of the Caloosahatchee culture.

== Geographic extent and variant districts ==
In the first half of the 20th century archaeologists regarded all of southern Florida (south of a line from north of Port Charlotte to Fort Pierce) as a single culture area. Large excavations of archaeological sites were less common in southern Florida than in the rest of the state, especially inland from the coasts. Most of the ceramics found in southern Florida were undecorated, hampering the recognition of cultural and chronological differences. The lack of evidence of maize cultivation in South Florida also contributed to the perception that it was a single culture area, inhabited by hunter-gatherers practicing an Archaic lifestyle.

As more was learned about the archaeology of southern Florida in the 1960s and 1970s, the region was divided into three parts, Okeechobee (the Okeechobee Basin and areas to east and west of it), Calusa (the southwest coast and inland areas), and Tekesta (the rest of southern Florida, including the Florida Keys. Uncertainty about the relationship of the Calusa and Tequesta people to their namesake regions and new archaeological data led to a revision of the defined cultural areas. By late in the 20th century, southern Florida had been divided into the Caloosahatchee, Belle Glade, and Glades culture areas.

The Glades culture area is defined to include the Everglades, the Florida Keys, the Atlantic coast of Florida north through present-day Martin County and the Gulf coast north to Marco Island in Collier County. The definition does not include the area around Lake Okeechobee, which was part of the Belle Glade culture. Three areas at the extremities of the cultural area are regarded as possible variant districts: the Ten Thousand Islands district in southern coastal Collier County and mainland Monroe County, the East Okeechobee district in eastern Martin and Palm Beach counties, and the Florida Keys.

== Artifacts ==
=== Pottery ===
The Glades culture is defined almost entirely on the basis of pottery. Much of the pottery throughout the Glades culture period was undecorated. It is identified as Glades primarily by the character of the sand and grit included in the clay used to form the pottery. Most Glades pottery was produced by coiling. Some bowls were decorated with puncture marks and/or incisions. A late development was "tooling", in which the rims of pots were decorated by pinching (resembling the edge of a pie crust), folding, or pressing a dowel into the rim. Glades Tooled pots were otherwise undecorated carinated bowls. Most Glades pots were "open mouthed hemispherical bowl[s]".

In 1939, John Goggin described two types of pottery as indicative of the Glades culture, Glades Gritty, made of a hard paste with a quartz sand temper, and Biscayne Chalky, made of a soft paste with either no temper or a very fine fiber temper. The Biscayne Chalky ware was eventually synonymized to the St. Johns series of northern Florida. In 1944, Goggin described the Glades series, based on the Glades Gritty ware.

Pottery types of the Glades series include:

- Glades Plain (500 BCE – 1700 CE) is the plain form of the Glades series. It was in use throughout the extent and duration of the Glades culture. Many archaeologists do not believe that it can be reliably distinguished from plain, sand-tempered ware found elsewhere in southern Florida.
- Glades Red (100–1600 CE) is Glades Plain ware with red paint.
- Fort Drum Incised (100–1600 CE) has "a pattern of vertical or diagonal ticking on the lip, or extending from the lip onto the rim."
- Cane Patch Incised or Jab and Drag (500–800 CE) has meandering lines or running linked "v"s made by a "drag and jab" technique using a tool with a rough end.
- Fort Drum Punctuate (700–1000 CE) has two or three rows of punched holes, sometimes forming semicircles, surrounding the rim.
- Miami Incised (750–900 CE) has equally spaced diagonal groups of two to six parallel lines around the rims.
- Opa Locka Incised (750–900 CE) has vertical rows of downward-facing arcs or semicircles surrounding the rim. In some cases the arcs appear to have been made by thumbnail impressions.
- Dade Incised (750–1000 CE) is a rare type with three concentric upward-opening curved incised lines repeated around the rim.
- Plantation Pinched (1000–1150 CE) has pinch marks, ranging from a band around the rim to large areas on the sides, and in some cases, on the bottom.
- Glades Noded (1000(?)–1200) has one or two rows beneath the lip of embossments. The embossments were produced by pressing on the inside of the bowl to push out the clay without puncturing the wall of the bowl.
- Key Largo Incised (1000–1400 CE) has one or more rows of downward opening loops or arches surrounding the rim. The lips of later vessels of this type may be decorated by crimping or incised arcs.
- Matecumbe Incised (1200–1400 CE) has cross-hatching forming a diamond pattern. Line spacing varies from 10 to 70 millimetres.
- Surfside Incised (1200–1600 CE) has smoother sides than most Glades ware with one to three (commonly two) straight lines around the body of the bowl parallel to the lip. The lines were incised with a square-ended or pointed tool. This is the only type of Glades ware that had lugs and handles.
- Glades Tooled (1400–1750 CE) has a thickened lip modified by pressing the damp clay with a small round rod. The rest of the vessel was undecorated. There are two types of Glades Tooled ware. One type was a hemispherical bowl with the rim turned slightly inward and the lip crimped or scalloped, creating gadrooning. The second type was almost globular with a small mouth and the lip marked with grooves, notches, or gougings.
- Arch Creek Incised has paired incised zigzags repeated around the rim.
- Natural Bridge Incised has a pair of incised intertwined lines that form a guilloché surrounding the rim.
- Sanibel Incised (700–900) has small ticks or gashes in one or more lines, forming running "v"s resembling chevrons.
- Gordon's Pass Incised (700–900) has lines and ticking often resembling feathers.

Pottery of the St. Johns series, originally described in southern Florida as "Biscayne Chalky" ware, has been found in Glades culture sites. Griffin, while admitting that the presence of St. Johns ware in southern Florida presents a problem, rejects the idea that "chalky" ware was produced in the Glades culture area because there is no commonality in the decorative motifs used in the two series. It has been assumed that St. Johns ware is "chalky" because it is made with clay from the St. Johns River valley that includes fresh water sponge spicules. Bloch et al. found that muck, which is found in various locations in southern Florida, can serve as a temper that produces "chalky" ware. They conclude that St. Johns ware was produced over much of the Florida peninsula, and not just in the St. Johns valley.

Pottery types of the St. Johns series found in the Glades culture area include:

- St. Johns Plain (earlier called Biscayne Plain) has a smooth, chalky, soft surface. The surface is grey to buff, while the core is dark grey to black. This Ware was present in the Glades culture area from 500 BCE until 200 CE, and then again, after a 700 year absence, from 900 to 1750.
- St. Johns Checked Stamped (earlier called Biscayne Checked Stamp) (750–1565) has check stamping produced by pressing a carved paddle over most or all of the outside of the vessel. The pattern can consist of squares, rectangles, or diamonds.
- Dunns Creek Red (earlier called Biscayne Red) was St. Johns Plain ware covered with red ocher paint.
- St. Johns Incised (a.k.a. Belle Glade Incised) (600–1700) had incised designs derived from Orange Incised ware of the Orange period.

A Goodland series has been defined based on pottery found on Marco Island. It has a fine grit as temper and is somewhat chalky. Goodland Plain (500 BCE – 700 CE) and Goodland Red (500 BCE – 1400 CE), with red paint, have been defined as types. Belle Glade Plain ware (600–1700) has a surface that has been compacted by a tool that dragged grains of sand across the surface, leaving it scratched and pitted.

Pottery types from outside of southern Florida have been found in Glades culture sites, and are generally assumed to have been traded into the area. Leon-Jefferson and San Marcos pottery types found at Glades culture sites may be due to people who moved to the area from northern Florida after the original peoples of the Glades culture died out or left the area in the 18th century.

Based on similarities between design motifs of Glades II pottery and pottery of the Cantabria tradition in south-central Cuba, several archaeologists have raised the possibility of a pre-historic connection between Cuba and southern Florida. More recent work has established that the Cantabria pottery in question dates from the very late pre-historic and post-European contact periods, considerably later than the Glades II period. Knight and Worth also point out that the people of the Cantabria tradition practiced intensive agriculture, used specialized tools for processing root crops, and possessed typically Taino ritual gear such as Zemi figurines, none of which are known from any Glades culture site.

=== Shell ===
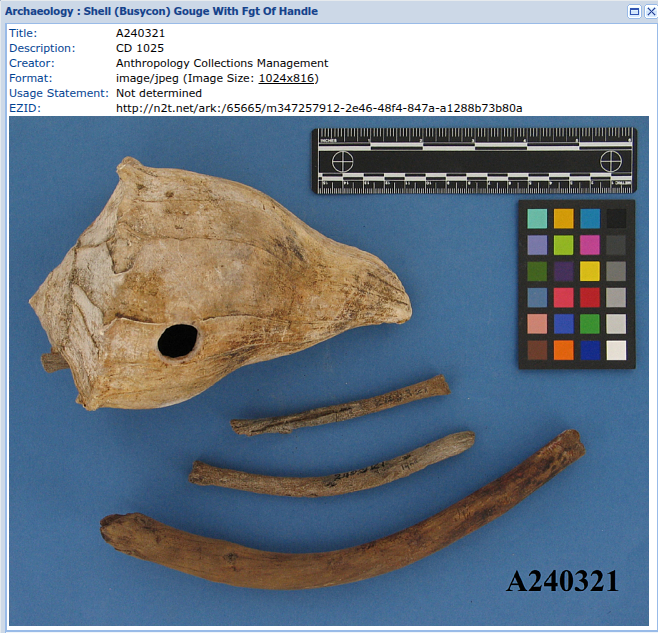
Gouge fashioned from a Busycon shell found at Key Marco site

Most tools found in Glades culture sites are made of bone or shell. Tools made from the shells of large sea snails (Busycon, Pleuroploca, and Strombus) included picks, hammers, adzes, celts, gouges, chisels, awls, knives, scrapers, cups, and dippers. Clam shells were used as anvils.

Sea snail shells were often modified by removing the columella, the tightly coiled "pillar" running along the axis of the shell. Such modified shells have been described as dippers and bowls. Pieces of the large outer whorls of sea snail shells were fashioned into vessels described as cups, saucers, and spoons. Whole sea snail shells were fashioned into picks by grinding the lower end of the shell into a chisel-shaped point. Picks usually had holes that would take a wooden handle. Cushing found some specimens at Key Marco in 1896 that still had lashings holding a handle in place.

Whole sea snail shells were also used as hammers, with a pounding surface on the lower end. While some may have been fashioned as hammers from the start, archaeologists believe most began as picks, and then were used as hammers after the chisel-point had worn down. Some hammers appear to have been hafted, while others had much of the outer whorls cut away so that the columella could be used as a handle. Both ends of some shells had been used as pounding surfaces.

Pieces of shell were fashioned into small blades that were set in sockets in antlers. Celts and chisels were fashioned from larger pieces of shell. Celts were probably used to work wood. Small columellas were sharpened at one end and used as awls. Shells of Macrocallista nimbosa, the sunray venus clam, were used as knives or scrapers.

Other artifacts of shell include pierced bivalve shells, gorgets, pendants, beads, and rings. Goggin noted that there were "surprisingly few" shell beads found at Glades culture sites, considering how much use the culture made of shell. Cushing found earplugs at Key Marco that were made from wood, shell rings, and tortoise shell. Small figurines, often depicting birds, were carved from shell.

=== Stone ===
Chert is not found in southern Florida, and tools made from that mineral are rare in the Glades culture area. Some chert projectile points may be from the Tampa Bay region. A few chert or flint knives have also been found. Stone celts, presumably acquired by trade from other areas, are rare but have been found throughout southern Florida. A ground stone axe and a couple of stone chisels have been found, as well as a chisel made from fossilized bone. Many tools were made from locally available sedimentary rocks such as limestone and sandstone. Such tools include hones or abraders, small smoothing stones, and pounders or hammers. Pieces of pumice, which presumably had washed up on Florida beaches after floating from the Caribbean, were also used as smoothers.

Other artifacts made from limestone or sandstone are common in the region. Grooved pebbles, grooved stones up to ten centimetres long, and perforated stones up to 12 centimetres in diameter are thought to have been used as fishing net weights. It has also been suggested that the grooved pebbles were used as bolas stones. Larger perforated stones may have been used as anchors for canoes, or as weights for offshore longline fishing. Plummets were made from limestone and grooved pebbles, and may have been used as weights for fishing nets, or as personal decorations. Although rare, stone beads and gorgets have been found. A number of stone ceremonial tablets resembling Mississippian copper plates in their display of motifs of the Southeastern Ceremonial Complex have been found in the culture area. Small figurines, often depicting birds, were carved from limestone.

=== Bone ===
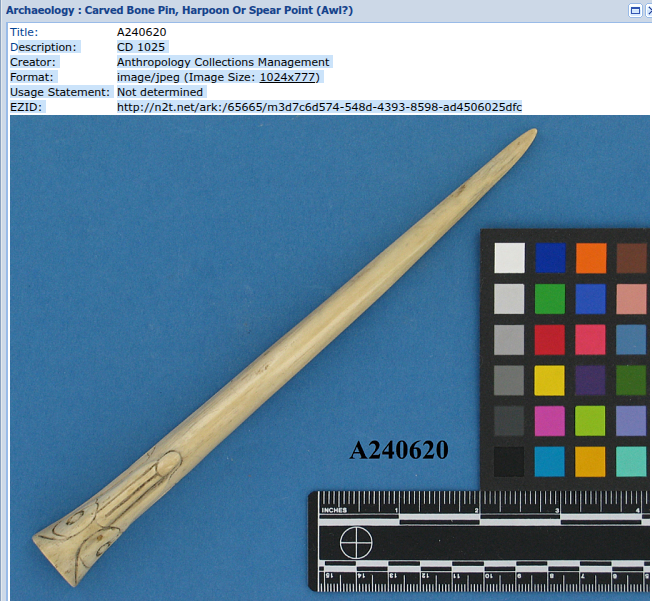
Bone point with engraving on base excavated at Key Marco

The people of the Glades culture used bone (usually deer, but sometimes, human), antlers, teeth, stingray tail spines, and sailfish or marlin bills to fashion tools and other objects. Antlers were often used as for composite adzes, with a socket at one end for a shell blade or a shark or alligator tooth, and a socket at the other end for a wooden handle. Single examples of antlers used as a pick and a chisel have been found. Bone was used for awls, daggers, fids, points, pins, punches, spatulas, fish hooks and gorges, beads, rings, pendants, and ear ornaments. Many of the points were socketed.

Stingray spines and sailfish or marlin bills were also used for points. Fish vertebrae, usually shark or sawfish, were made into beads or ear ornaments. Shark teeth were used for cutting and engraving. Animal jaws and barracuda teeth were also used as tools. Fishing net gauges were made from turtle bones and shell. Bear and shark teeth had holes drilled in them for use as ornaments.

=== Wood ===
Painted wood mask excavated at Key Marco

Objects made from wood include canoe paddles, pounders shaped like a dumbbell, bird and anthropomorphic figurines, and bowls. The Key Marco site, on Marco Island at the northern end of the Ten Thousand Islands, held a very rich collection of artefacts, including many wooden objects that had been preserved by being buried in muck. Finds there included wooden tool handles still attached to shell, bone, or shark teeth tools, mortars and pestles, a toy catamaran canoe, throwing stick handles and darts, boxes, trays, masks, and plaques. Many of the wooden objects were carved, including tool handles, boxes, masks and plaques, and some were painted. Two wooden sculptures, a painted deer head, and a kneeling feline figure, the Key Marco Cat, were among the finds. Some of the masks has movable parts.

== Chronology ==
On the basis of pottery sequences, the Glades culture period is divided into Glades I, 500 BCE to 750 CE, Glades II, 900 to 1200, and Glades III, 1200 to 1513.

The early Glades I period, from 500 BCE to CE 500, is based on the introduction of sand-tempered pottery in the area. (Note: Pottery had been used in the St. Johns River valley to the north since the beginning of the Orange period (2000–500 BCE), about 1,500 years before it appeared in southern Florida.) The pottery, called Glades Plain or Glades Gritty Ware, was undecorated. The late Glades I period (AD 500–750) saw the addition of decorated types including Sanibel Incised, Cane Patch Incised, Fort Drum Incised, and Fort Drum Punctated.

Decorated pottery introduced in the Glades IIa period (750–900) included Key Largo Incised, Opa Locka Incised, and Miami Incised. Key Largo Incised comprised most the decorated pottery during the Glades IIb period (900–1100), with the addition of Matecumbe Incised. In the Glades IIc period (1100–1200) decorated pottery almost disappeared, with only some pots with grooved lips present and the appearance of Plantation Pinched.

The Glades IIIa period (1200–1400) saw the appearance of Surfside Incised and some lip-grooving. St. Johns Checked Stamped and Safety Harbor ware also appeared. Decorated pottery again largely disappeared in the Glades IIIb period (1400–1513). St. Johns Checked Stamped and Safety Harbor sherds continued to be present and Glades Tooled ware appeared.

== Environment ==
The Glades culture area consists primarily of wetlands. Much of it includes the Everglades, dominated by sawgrass marshes interspersed with tree islands. Other major wetlands in the culture area are the Big Cypress Swamp and the Ten Thousand Islands. Salt marshes and mangrove forests, now much reduced by development, formerly lined both coasts. The culture area also included areas of higher ground, particularly along both the Atlantic and the Gulf coasts, with (pine flatwoods, pine rockland and rockland hammocks), which are now also much reduced by development. The environment of the Glades culture area was less productive than that of the Belle Glade and Caloosahatchee culture areas and could not support a large or dense population of hunter-fisher-gatherers.

=== Climate ===
The historic climate of the Glades culture area is tropical. All of the area west of the Atlantic Coastal Ridge is classified as tropical savannah (Aw), while the easternmost part, the Atlantic Coastal Ridge to the Atlantic Ocean, is classified as tropical monsoon (Am). Rainfall is seasonal, with a wet season from April to November. Rainfall also varies from year-to-year. Periods of abundant rainfall alternate with droughts. Droughts not only lower water levels in the Everglades and other wetlands, reducing their productivity and allowing fires to spread, particularly in sawgrass, but also reduce the flow of fresh water into coastal waters, raising the salinity levels of those waters and disrupting the production of resources used by the prehistoric inhabitants of the region.

Paleoclimatic data indicate that from about 7000 BP, when the Everglades began to form, until about 2800 BP, shortly before the emergence of the Glades culture, the climate of southern Florida was very wet, with many tropical cyclones. The jet stream tended to a more northerly path than in other periods, and the Bermuda High was northeast of its position in other periods. This resulted in the tracks of many tropical cyclones passing over or near southern Florida. From 3000 or 2800 BP the jet stream shifted to a more southerly track and the Bermuda High moved southwestward, shifting tropical cyclone tracks to the west of Florida and producing a drier climate in southern Florida. An increase in El Niño activity starting around 2700 BP may have reduced the intensity of tropical storms in the Atlantic.

=== Sea levels ===
The sea levels around Florida varied during the Glades period. The early Glades I period (500 BCE – 500 CE) coincided with the Roman Warm Period in Europe, in which sea levels in southwest Florida were relatively high (the Wulfert High). The late Glades I (500–750) and the first part of the Glades IIa period (750–850) coincided with the Vandal Minimum in Europe, with lower sea levels (the Buck Key Low) in southwest Florida. The remainder of the Glades II period, (900–1200) coincided with the Medieval Warm Period in Europe and the Mississippian Optimum in North America, with higher sea levels (the La Costa High) in southwest Florida. The Glades III period (1200–1750) coincided with the Little Ice Age, with lower sea levels (the Sanibel II Low) in southwest Florida.

The southwest coast of Florida has a very shallow slope, and small changes in sea level can move the shore line considerable distances. It has been documented that in the Caloosahatchee culture area to the north of the Ten Thousand Islands, principal habitation sites were abandoned and later reoccupied in response to sea level changes, and later, many habitation sites were located on mounds that were raised in response to rising sea levels. There are many shell works in the Ten Thousand Islands and the area around the Turner River to the south that served as habitation sites.

== Site types ==
Archaeological sites in the Glades culture area include earth and shell middens and sand and shell mounds. Some sites are extensive, including large shell works. Large middens and mounds probably accumulated over many generations, and the larger ones may have been the site of a village. Smaller middens may represent temporary camps used in hunting or gathering resources. Shell middens and mounds are common on and near the coasts, while earth middens are more common in the interior. Some of the mounds may have used for ceremonial purposes or had a charnel house on the top.

Glades culture sites were commonly located on the coasts near estuaries and fresh water sources. Sites were also located on the Atlantic Coastal Ridge and on high ground in the Big Cypress Swamp and the Everglades. While shell middens occurred on both coasts, the largest were on the southwest Gulf coast, in the Ten Thousand Islands and the area around the Turner River to the south. A number of the sites there developed into shell works, which combined mounds with platforms, ramps, and other structures. Some mounds in the interior were black earth middens, with layers of very dark soil derived from deposits of organic material. Larger mounds and middens were likely the site of villages, while smaller middens were special-use sites, used seasonally or more frequently for hunting, fishing, or gathering shellfish and wild plants. The population of the Glades culture area was more scattered than the populations of other culture areas in Florida.

== Historic peoples ==
Early Spanish accounts from the 16th century, particularly from Hernando de Escalante Fontaneda, named many chiefs or chiefdoms on both coasts of the Glades cultural area, most of which are otherwise unknown. Muspa, at the southern end of Marco Island, was the northernmost of more than a dozen sub-chiefdoms in the Ten Thousand Islands District and the area around the Turner River to the south that had become part of the Calusa domain. On the Atlantic coast, Escalante Fontenado spoke of a province of Tegesta running from Los Martires (the Florida Keys) to Cape Canaveral, including Guarungube (Key West), Cuchyaga, Tatesta, Tegesta (Tequesta), Tavaçio or Tavasia, Janar, Cavista, Custegiyo, and Jaega.

In 1675, a Spanish list of peoples on the Atlantic coast south of Cape Canaveral included the Ais people and Santaluces, located in the Malabar culture area, and Jaegas, Jobeses (Hobe), Viscaynos, and Matecumbes of the Glades culture. After the collapse of the Spanish mission system in northern Florida early in the 18th century, Muscogee and other peoples raided throughout the Florida peninsula, disrupting and displacing the resident peoples. When Spanish missionaries briefly established a mission on Biscayne Bay in 1743, they named several peoples living in southeastern Florida, but did not mention the Tequestas.

At the time of first European contact, the Ten Thousand Islands district was part of the Calusa domain, (Note: Muspa was the name of a people and of a town on Key Marco, which was a sub-chiefdom under the Calusa in the Ten Thousand Islands district. Around 1300, pottery and artifact styles on Marco Island changed to become very similar to those of the Caloosahatchee culture, practiced by the Calusa people to the north, indicating a close alliance with or absorption by the Calusa.) the East Okeechobee district was inhabited by the Jaega people, and the area of Broward and Miami-Dade counties was inhabited by the Tequesta people.

== Notable sites ==
- Bear Lake Mounds Archeological District
- Burns Lake Site
- C. J. Ostl Site
- Dismal Key
- Hinson Mounds
- Horr's Island was a site on an island next to Marco Island that was occupied long before the beginning of the Glades culture.
- Jupiter Inlet Historic and Archeological Site
- Key Marco was a site on Marco Island excavated in 1896 by Frank Hamilton Cushing.
- Miami Circle, believed to be postholes for a structure built 1,800 to 2,000 years ago.
- Plaza Site
- Pompano Beach Mound
- Rock Mound Archeological Site
- Rookery Mound
- Shark River Slough Archeological District
- Sugar Pot Site
- Turner River Site

== See also ==
- Indigenous people of the Everglades region

== Sources ==
- Ardren, T.; Bloch, L.; MacDonald, B.L.; Kuo, A.; Valerio-Romero, K.; Garcia, K.R.; Fitzpatrick, S.; Thompson, V.; LeFebvre, M.J. (February 2026). "Provenance of pottery from the Florida Keys: A geochemical pilot study". Journal of Archaeological Science: Reports. 69 105519.
- Bloch, Lindsay; Wallis, Neill J.; Kamenov, George; Jaeger, John M. (2019). "Production origins and matrix constituents of spiculate pottery in Florida, USA: Defining ubiquitous St Johns ware by LA-ICP-MS and XRD" (PDF). Journal of Archaeological Science: Reports. 24: 313–323.
- Carr, Robert S. (2012a). "Mississippean Influence in the Glades, Belle Glade, and East Okeechobee Areas of South Florida". In Ashley, Keith; White, Nancy Marie (eds.). Late Prehistoric Florida: Archaeology at the Edge of the Mississippian World. Gainesville, Florida: University Press of Florida. pp. 62–80. ISBN 978-0-8130-4014-1.
- Carr, Robert S. (2012b). Digging Miami. Gainesville, Florida: University Press of Florida. ISBN 978-0-8130-4206-0.
- Glaser, P.H.; Hansen, B.C.S.; Donovan, J.J.; Givnish, T.J.; Stricker, C.A.; XVolin, C.A. (2013). "Holocene dynamics of the Florida Everglades with respect to climate, dustfall, and tropical storms". Proceedings of the National Academy of Sciences: 17211–17216. doi:10.1073/pnas.1222239110. PMC 3808639.
- Goggin, John M. (April–June 1940). "The Distribution of Pottery Wares in the Glades Archaeological Area of South Florida". New Mexico Anthropologist. 4 (2): 22–33. doi:10.1086/newmexianthr.4.2.4291225. ISSN 0734-7030.
- Griffin, John W. (2002). Milanich, Jerald T.; Miller, James J (eds.). Archaeology of the Everglades. Gainesville, Florida: University Press of Florida. ISBN 0-8130-2558-3.
- Hale, Leslie Williams (February 17, 2008). "Gone but hardly forgotten: Piecing together elusive Calusa history". Marco Eagle. Archived from the original on June 30, 2009.
- Knight, Vernon James; Worth, John E. (2021). "A Cuban Origin For Glades Pottery? A Provocative Hypothesis Revisited". In Cordell, Ann S.; Mitchem, Jeffrey M. (eds.). Methods, Mounds, and Missions: New Contributions to Florida Archaeology. Gainesville, Florida: University Press of Florida. pp. 193–206. doi:10.5744/florida/9781683402138.003.0009. ISBN 978-1-68340-338-8.
- MacMahon, Darcie A.; Marquardt, William H. (2004). The Calusa and Their Legacy: South Florida People and Their Environments. Gainesville, Florida: University Press of Florida. ISBN 0-8130-2773-X.
- Marquardt, William H.; Walker, Karen J. (2012). "South Florida during the Mississippian Period". In Ashley, Keith; White, Nancy Marie (eds.). Late Prehistoric Florida: Archaeology at the Edge of the Mississippian World. Gainesville, Florida: University Press of Florida. pp. 29–61. ISBN 978-0-8130-4014-1.
- Milanich, Jerald T. (1994). Archaeology of Precolumbian Florida. Gainesville, Florida: University Press of Florida. ISBN 0-8130-1273-2.
- Milanich, Jerald T. (1998a) [1995]. Florida Indians and the Invasion from Europe (Paperback ed.). Gainesville, Florida: University Press of Florida. ISBN 978-0-8130-1636-8.
- Milanich, Jerald T. (1998b). Florida's Indians from Ancient Times to the Present. Gainesville, Florida: University Press of Florida. ISBN 978-0-8130-1599-6.
- Austin, Daniel F. (Summer–Fall 1997). "The Glades Indians And the Plants they Used: Ethnobotany of an Extinct Culture" (PDF). The Palmetto, Quarterly Journal of the Florida Native Plant Society. 17 (2). Florida Native Plant Society.
- "Precolumbian People of Big Cypress" (PDF). National Park Service. 2011. Archived from the original (PDF) on March 23, 2012.
- Sassaman, Kenneth E. (March 2003). "New AMS Dates on Orange Fiber-Tempered Pottery from the Middle St.Johns Valley and Their Implications for Cultural History in Northeast Florida". The Florida Anthropologist. 56 (1): 5–13.
- Schwadron, Margo (2010). Landscapes of Maritime Complexity: Prehistoric Shell Works sites of the Ten Thousand Island, Florida (PDF) (PhD thesis). University of Leicester. Archived from the original on April 3, 2016.
- Worth, John E. (January 1995). "Fontaneda Revisited: Five Descriptions of Sixteenth-Century Florida". The Florida Historical Quarterly. 73 (3): 339–352. ISSN 0015-4113.
