= Burns Lake (disambiguation) =

Burns Lake is a village in British Columbia, Canada.

Burns Lake may also refer to:

== Canada ==
- Burns Lake Airport, near the village in Canada
- Burns Lake (LD Air) Water Aerodrome, near the village in Canada
- Burns Lake Park, near the village in Canada
- Burns Lake railway station, in the village in Canada
- Ts'il Kaz Koh First Nation, also known as Burns Lake Indian Band, centered on the village in Canada

== Other uses ==
- Burns Lake Site, a historic place in Florida, United States
