= Halfway Creek =

Halfway Creek may refer to:

- Halfway Creek, New South Wales, a locality in Australia
- Halfway Creek (Hyco River tributary), a stream in Halifax County, Virginia, US
- Halfway Creek (Indiana), a stream in Indiana, US
- Halfway Creek Site, an archaeological site located near Carnestown, Florida, US
