= Miles City =

Miles City could refer to some places in the United States:

- Miles City, Florida
- Miles City, Montana
  - Miles City Municipal Airport in Miles City, Montana
