= Calusa =

Historic Indigenous people in Florida, United States

Escampaba
- Map of the Calusa chiefdom

Total population
- Extinct as a tribe

Regions with significant populations
- United States (Florida)

Languages
- Calusa

Religion
- Native

The Calusa (/kəˈluːsə/ kə-LOO-sə, Calusa: *ka(ra)luś(i)) were a Native American people of Florida's southwest coast. Calusa society developed from that of archaic peoples of the Everglades region. Previous Indigenous cultures had lived in the area for thousands of years.

At the time of European contact in the 16th and 17th centuries, the historic Calusa were the people of the Caloosahatchee culture. They developed a complex culture based on estuarine fisheries rather than agriculture. Their principal city of Calos was probably at Mound Key, and their territory reached at least from Charlotte Harbor to Marco Island. Hernando de Escalante Fontaneda, a Spaniard who was held captive by Florida Indians from 1545 until 1566, described the Calusa realm as extending from Tanpa, at the mouth of Charlotte Harbor, down the coast to Muspa, at the southern end of Marco Island, and inland to Guacata on Lake Mayaimi (Lake Okeechobee). They had the highest population density of South Florida; estimates of total population at the time of European contact range from 10,000 to several times that, but these are speculative.

Calusa political influence and control also extended over other tribes in southern Florida, including the Mayaimi around Lake Okeechobee, and the Tequesta and Jaega on the southeast coast of the peninsula. Calusa influence may have also extended to the Ais tribe on the central east coast of Florida. European contact caused their extinction, through disease and violence.

== Culture ==
Early Spanish and French sources referred to the tribe, its chief town, and its chief as Calos, Calus, Caalus, and Carlos. Hernando de Escalante Fontaneda, a Spaniard held captive by the Calusa in the 16th century, recorded that Calusa meant "fierce people" in their language. By the early 19th century, Anglo-Americans in the area used the term Calusa for the people. It is based on the Mvskoke and Mikasuki (languages of the present-day Seminole and Miccosukee nations) ethnonym for the people who had lived around the Caloosahatchee River (also from the Creek language).

Juan Rogel, a Jesuit missionary to the Calusa in the late 1560s, noted the chief's name as Carlos, but wrote that the name of the kingdom was Escampaba, with an alternate spelling of Escampaha. Rogel also stated that the chief's name was Caalus, and that the Spanish had changed it to Carlos. Marquardt quotes a statement from the 1570s that "the Bay of Carlos ... in the Indian language is called Escampaba, for the cacique of this town, who afterward called himself Carlos in devotion to the Emperor" (Charles V, Holy Roman Emperor). Escampaba may be related to a place named Stapaba, which was identified in the area on an early 16th-century map.

== Origins ==
Paleo-Indians entered what is now Florida at least 12,000 years ago. By around 5000 BC, people started living in villages near wetlands. Favored sites were likely occupied for multiple generations. Florida's climate had reached current conditions, and the sea had risen close to its present level by about 3000 BC. People commonly occupied both fresh and saltwater wetlands. Because they relied on shellfish, they accumulated large shell middens during this period. Many people lived in large villages with ceremonial earthwork mounds, such as those at Horr's Island. People began firing pottery in Florida by 2000 BC.

By about 500 BC, the Archaic culture, which had been fairly uniform across Florida, shifted into more distinct regional cultures. Some Archaic artifacts have been found in the region later occupied by the Calusa, including one site classified as early Archaic, and dated before 5000 BC. There is evidence that the people intensively exploited Charlotte Harbor aquatic resources before 3500 BC. Undecorated pottery belonging to the early Glades culture appeared in the region around 500 BC. Pottery distinct from the Glades tradition developed in the region around AD 500, marking the beginning of the Caloosahatchee culture. This lasted until about 1750, and included the historic Calusa people. By 880, a complex society had developed with high population densities. Later periods in the Caloosahatchee culture are defined in the archaeological record by the appearance of pottery from other traditions.

The Caloosahatchee culture inhabited the Florida west coast from Estero Bay to Charlotte Harbor and inland about halfway to Lake Okeechobee, roughly covering what are now Charlotte and Lee counties. At the time of first European contact, the Caloosahatchee culture region formed the core of the Calusa domain. Artifacts related to fishing changed slowly over this period, with no obvious breaks in tradition that might indicate a replacement of the population.

Between 500 and 1000, the undecorated, sand-tempered pottery that had been common in the area was replaced by Belle Glade Plain pottery. This was made with clay containing spicules from freshwater sponges (Spongilla), and it first appeared inland in sites around Lake Okeechobee. This change may have resulted from the people's migration from the interior to the coastal region, or may reflect trade and cultural influences. Little change in the pottery tradition occurred after this. The Calusa were descended from people who had lived in the area for at least 1,000 years prior to European contact, and possibly for much longer than that.

== Society ==
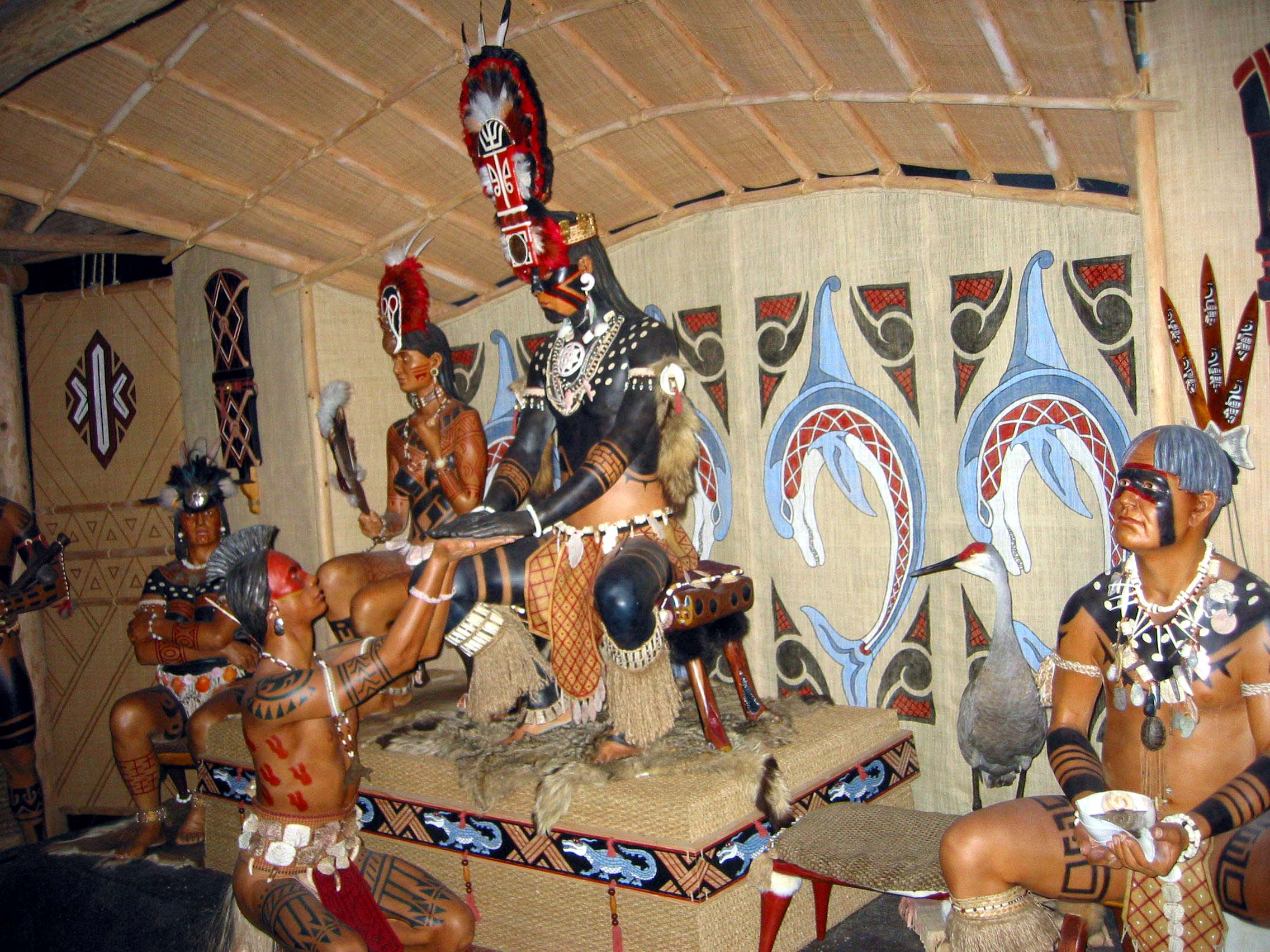
Diorama of a Calusa chief at the Florida Museum of Natural History

The Calusa had a stratified society, consisting of "commoners" and "nobles" in Spanish terms. While no evidence shows that the Calusa had institutionalized slavery, studies show they used captives for work or even sacrifice. A few leaders governed the tribe. They were supported by the labor of the majority of the Calusa. The leaders included the paramount chief or "king", a military leader (capitán general in Spanish), and a chief priest. The capital of the Calusa, and from where the rulers administered, was Mound Key, near present day Estero, Florida. An eyewitness account from 1566 mentioned a "king's house" on Mound Key that was large enough for "2,000 people to stand inside." In 1564, according to a Spanish source, the priest was the chief's father and the military leader was his cousin. The Spanish documented four cases of known succession to the position of paramount chief, recording most names in Spanish form. Senquene succeeded his brother (name unknown), and was in turn succeeded by his son Carlos. Carlos was succeeded by his cousin (and brother-in-law) Felipe, who was in turn succeeded by another cousin of Carlos, Pedro. The Spanish reported that the chief was expected to take his sister as one of his wives. The contemporary archeologists MacMahon and Marquardt suggest this statement may have been a misunderstanding of a requirement to marry a "clan-sister". The chief also married women from subject towns and allied tribes. This use of marriages to secure alliances was demonstrated when Carlos offered his sister Antonia in marriage to Spanish explorer Pedro Menéndez de Avilés in 1566.

== Material culture ==
=== Diet ===
The Calusa diet at settlements along the coast and estuaries consisted primarily of fish, in particular pinfish (Lagodon rhomboides), pigfish (redmouth grunt), (Orthopristis chrysoptera), and hardhead catfish (Ariopsis felis). These small fish were supplemented by larger bony fish, sharks and rays, mollusks, crustaceans, ducks, sea turtles and land turtles, and land animals. When Pedro Menéndez de Avilés visited in 1566, the Calusa served only fish and oysters to the Spanish. An analysis of faunal remains at one coastal habitation site, the Wightman site (on Sanibel Island), showed that more than 93% of the energy from animals in the diet came from fish and shellfish, less than 6% of the energy came from mammals, and less than 1% came from birds and reptiles. By contrast, at an inland site, Platt Island, mammals (primarily deer) accounted for more than 60% of the energy from animal meat, while fish provided just under 20%. The earliest known aquaculture in Florida was practiced by the Calusa kingdom.

Some authors have argued that the Calusa cultivated maize and Zamia integrifolia (coontie) for food, but Widmer argues that the evidence for maize cultivation by the Calusa depends on the proposition that the Narváez and de Soto expeditions landed in Charlotte Harbor rather than Tampa Bay, which is now generally discounted. No Zamia pollen has been found at any site associated with the Calusas, nor does Zamia grow in the wetlands that made up most of the Calusa environment. Marquardt notes that the Calusa turned down the offer of agricultural tools from the Spanish, saying that they had no need for them. The Calusa gathered a variety of wild berries, fruits, nuts, roots, and other plant parts. Widmer cites George Murdock's estimate that only some 20% of the Calusa diet consisted of wild plants that they gathered. While no evidence of plant food was found at the Wightman site, archeological digs on Sanibel Island and Useppa Island revealed evidence that the Calusa did in fact consume wild plants such as cabbage palm, prickly pear, hog plum, acorns, wild papaya, and chili peppers. Also, evidence indicates that as early as 2,000 years ago, the Calusa cultivated a gourd of the species Cucurbita pepo and the bottle gourd, which were used for net floats and dippers.

=== Tools ===
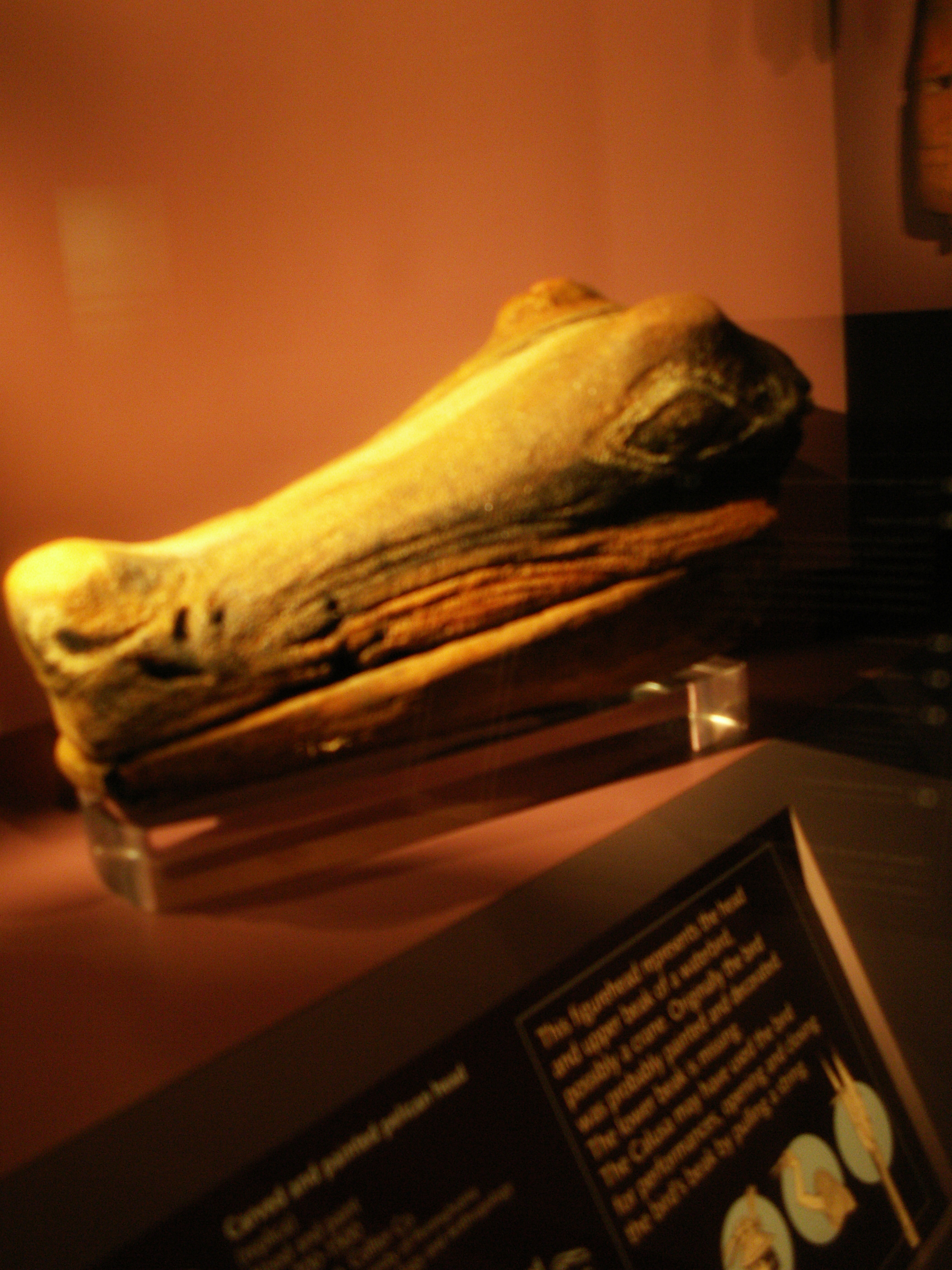
Calusa carving of an alligator's head

The Calusa caught most of their fish with nets. Nets were woven with a standard mesh size; nets with different mesh sizes were used seasonally to catch the most abundant and useful fish available. The Calusa made bone and shell gauges that they used in net weaving. Cultivated gourds were used as net floats, and sinkers and net weights were made from mollusk shells. The Calusa also used spears, hooks, and throat gorges to catch fish. Well-preserved nets, net floats, and hooks were found at Key Marco, in the territory of the neighboring Muspa tribe.

Mollusk shells and wood were used to make hammering and pounding tools. Mollusk shells and shark teeth were used for grating, cutting, carving, and engraving. The Calusa wove nets from palm-fiber cord. Cord was also made from cabbage palm leaves, saw palmetto trunks, Spanish moss, false sisal (Agave decipiens), and the bark of cypress and willow trees. The Calusa also made fish traps, weirs, and fish corrals from wood and cord. Artifacts of wood that have been found include bowls, ear ornaments, masks, plaques, "ornamental standards", and a finely carved deer head. The plaques and other objects were often painted. To date, no one has found a Calusa dugout canoe, but such vessels could have been constructed from cypress or pine, as used by other Florida tribes. The process of shaping the boat was achieved by burning the middle and subsequently chopping and removing the charred center, using robust shell tools. In 1954, a dugout canoe was found during excavation for a middle school in Marathon, Florida. Not conserved and in poor shape, the canoe is now displayed at the Crane Point Museum and Nature Center in Marathon and is tentatively attributed to the Calusa.

=== Housing ===
The Calusa lived in large communal houses, which were two stories high. When Pedro Menéndez de Avilés visited the capital in 1566, he described the chief's house as large enough to hold 2,000 without crowding, indicating it also served as the council house. When the chief formally received Menéndez in his house, the chief sat on a raised seat surrounded by 500 of his principal men, while his sister-wife sat on another raised seat surrounded by 500 women. The chief's house was described as having two big windows, suggesting that it had walls. Five friars who stayed in the chief's house in 1697 complained that the roof let in the rain, sun, and dew. The chief's house, and possibly the other houses at Calos, were built on top of earthen mounds. In a report from 1697, the Spanish noted 16 houses in the Calusa capital of Calos, which had 1,000 residents.

=== Clothing and personal decoration ===
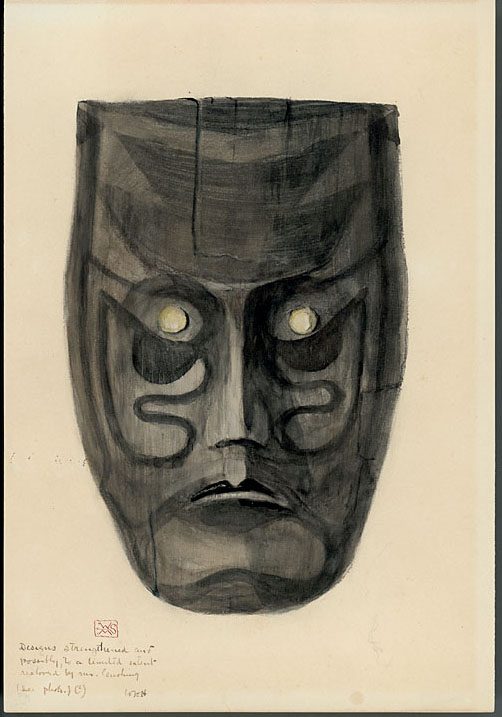
Watercolor of mask excavated at Key Marco, made by Caloosas or a closely related people

The Calusa wore minimal clothing. The men wore deerskin breechcloths. The Spanish left less description about Calusa women's attire. At the time, most Indigenous women of Florida wore skirts made from Spanish moss. The Calusa painted their bodies on a regular basis, but did not tattoo themselves. The men wore their hair long. The missionaries recognized that having a Calusa man cut his hair upon converting to Christianity (and European style) would be a great sacrifice. Little was recorded of jewelry or other ornamentation among the Calusa. During Menéndez de Avilés's visit in 1566, the chief's wife was described as wearing pearls, precious stones, and gold beads around her neck. The heir of the chief wore gold in an ornament on his forehead and beads on his legs.

Ceremonial or other artistic masks have been discovered and were previously described by the Spanish who first encountered the Calusa. Some of these masks had moving parts that used pull strings and hinges so that a person could alter the look of a mask while wearing it.

=== Beliefs ===
The Calusa believed that three supernatural beings ruled the world, that people had three souls, and that souls migrated to animals after death. The most powerful ruler governed the physical world, the second-most powerful ruled human governments, and the last helped in wars, choosing which side would win. The Calusa believed that the three souls were the pupil of a person's eye, his shadow, and his reflection. The soul in the eye's pupil stayed with the body after death, and the Calusa would consult with that soul at the graveside. The other two souls left the body after death and entered into an animal. If a Calusa killed such an animal, the soul would migrate to a lesser animal and eventually be reduced to nothing.

Calusa ceremonies included processions of priests and singing women. The priests wore carved masks, which were at other times hung on the walls inside a temple. Hernando de Escalante Fontaneda, an early chronicler of the Calusa, described "sorcerers in the shape of the devil, with some horns on their heads," who ran through the town yelling like animals for four months at a time.

The Calusa remained committed to their belief system despite Spanish attempts to convert them to Catholicism. The "nobles" resisted conversion in part because their power and position were intimately tied to the belief system; they were intermediaries between the gods and the people. Conversion would have destroyed the source of their authority and legitimacy. The Calusa resisted physical encroachment and spiritual conversion by the Spanish and their missionaries for almost 200 years. After suffering decimation by disease, the tribe was destroyed by Creek and Yamasee raiders early in the 18th century.

Evidence shows that the Calusa buried their dead in mounds. After death, a body was placed in a charnel house to let the flesh fall away naturally, or in some cases, a medicine man with long fingernails would scrape the flesh from bone. Afterwards, the bones were gathered up, placed in a basket, and buried in a mound. These mounds were both for burials and religious ceremonies, as the Calusa gathered atop them on "Holy Days to sacrifice aromatic plants and honey".

== European contact ==
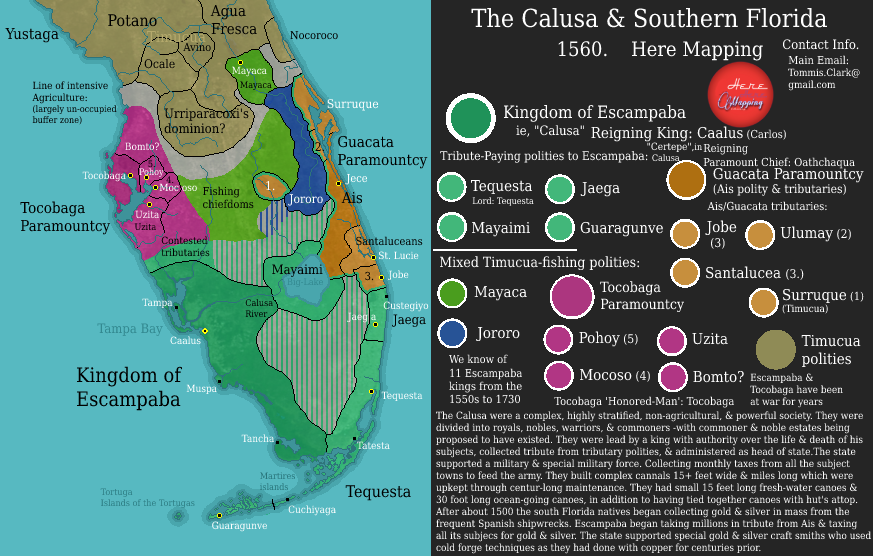
Calusa Kingdom/Paramountcy around the time of contact in 1560

The first recorded contact between the Calusa and Europeans was in 1513, when Juan Ponce de León landed on the west coast of Florida in May, probably at the mouth of the Caloosahatchee River, after his earlier discovery of Florida in April. The Calusa knew of the Spanish before this landing, however, as they had taken in Native American refugees from the Spanish subjugation of Cuba. The Spanish careened one of their ships, and Calusas offered to trade with them. After 10 days, a man who spoke Spanish approached Ponce de León's ships with a request to wait for the arrival of the Calusa chief. Soon, 20 war canoes attacked the Spanish, who drove off the Calusa, killing or capturing several of them. The next day, 80 "shielded" canoes attacked the Spanish ships, but the battle was inconclusive. The Spanish departed and returned to Puerto Rico. In 1517, Francisco Hernández de Córdoba landed in southwest Florida on his return voyage from the Yucatán. He was also attacked by the Calusa. In 1521, Ponce de León returned to southwest Florida to plant a colony, but the Calusa drove the Spanish out, mortally wounding Ponce de León.

The Pánfilo de Narváez expedition of 1528 and the Hernando de Soto expedition of 1539 both landed in the vicinity of Tampa Bay, north of the Calusa domain. Dominican missionaries reached the Calusa domain in 1549, but withdrew because of the hostility of the tribe. Salvaged goods and survivors from wrecked Spanish ships reached the Calusa during the 1540s and 1550s. The best information about the Calusa comes from the Memoir of Hernando de Escalante Fontaneda, one of these survivors. Fontaneda was shipwrecked on the east coast of Florida, likely in the Florida Keys, about 1550, when he was thirteen years old. Although many others survived the shipwreck, only Fontaneda was spared by the tribe in whose territory they landed. Warriors killed all the adult men. Fontaneda lived with various tribes in southern Florida for the next 17 years before being found by the Menendez de Avilés expedition.

In 1566, Pedro Menéndez de Avilés, founder of St. Augustine, made contact with the Calusa. He struck an uneasy peace with their leader Caluus, or Carlos. Menéndez married Carlos' sister, who took the baptismal name Doña Antonia at conversion. Menéndez left a garrison of soldiers and a Jesuit mission, San Antón de Carlos, at the Calusa capital. Hostilities erupted, and the Spanish soldiers killed Carlos, his successor Felipe, and several of the "nobles" before they abandoned their fort and mission in 1569.

For more than a century after the Avilés adventure, little contact happened between the Spanish and Calusa. Re-entering the area in 1614, Spanish forces attacked the Calusa as part of a war between the Calusa and Spanish-allied tribes around Tampa Bay. A Spanish expedition to ransom some captives held by the Calusa in 1680 was forced to turn back; neighboring tribes refused to guide the Spanish, for fear of retaliation by the Calusa. In 1697, Franciscan missionaries established a mission to the Calusa, but left after a few months.

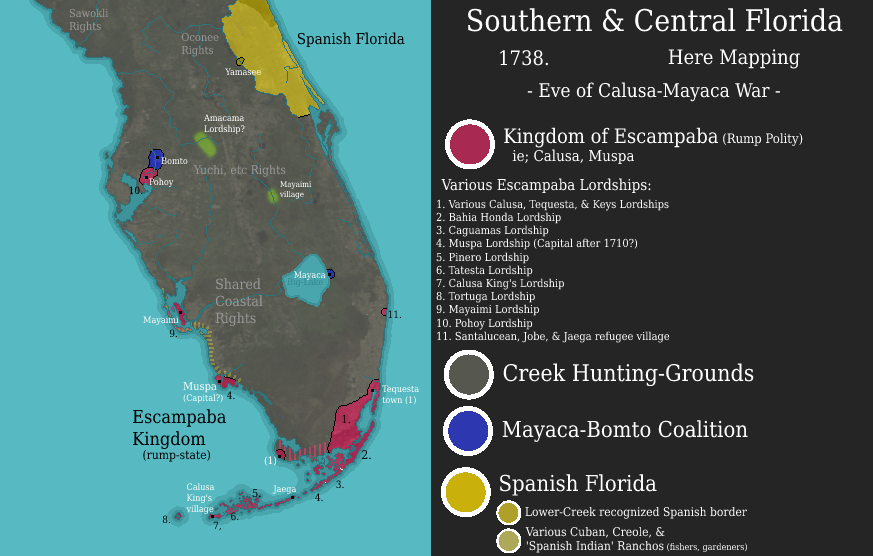
Calusa Kingdom/Paramountcy as a rump state in 1738

After the outbreak of war between Spain and England in 1702, slaving raids by Uchise Creek and Yamasee Indians allied with the Province of Carolina began reaching far down the Florida peninsula. The Carolinan colonists supplied firearms to the Creek and Yemasee, but the Calusa, who had isolated themselves from Europeans, had none. Ravaged by new infectious diseases introduced to the Americas by European contact and by the slaving raids, the surviving Calusa retreated south and east.

In 1711, the Spanish helped evacuate 270 Indians, including many Calusa, from the Florida Keys to Cuba (where almost 200 soon died). They left 1,700 behind. The Spanish founded a mission on Biscayne Bay in 1743 to serve survivors from several tribes, including the Calusa, who had gathered there and in the Florida Keys. The mission was closed after only a few months.

After Spain ceded Florida to the Kingdom of Great Britain in 1763, the remaining tribes of South Florida were relocated to Cuba by the Spanish, completing their removal from the region. While a few Calusa individuals may have stayed behind and been absorbed into the Seminole, no documentation supports that. Cuban fishing camps (ranchos) operated along the southwest Florida coast from the 18th century into the middle of the 19th century. Some of the Spanish Indians (often of mixed Spanish-Indian heritage) who worked at the fishing camps likely were descended from Calusa.

== See also ==
- Caloosahatchee culture
- Dismal Key
- Fort Center
- Indigenous peoples of Florida
