= Old Hendry County Courthouse =

- U.S. National Register of Historic Places
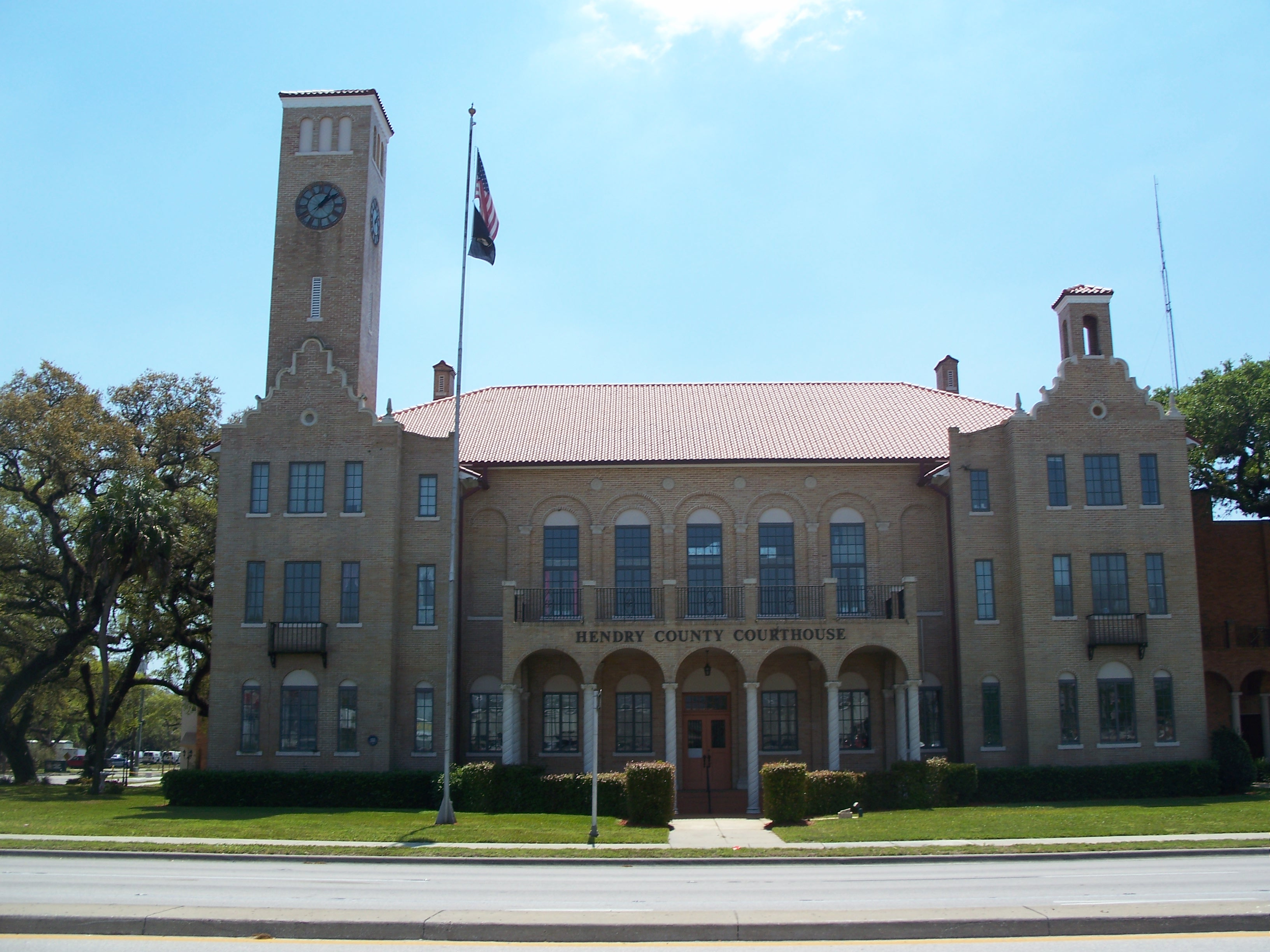

- Location within Florida Location within the United States
- Interactive map showing the location of Old Hendry County Courthouse
- Location: LaBelle, Florida
- Coordinates: 26°45′42″N 81°26′16″W
- Built: 1926
- Architect: Edward Columbus Hosford
- Architectural style: Mediterranean Revival-Mission Revival
- NRHP reference No.: 90001744
- Added to NRHP: November 8, 1990

The Old Hendry County Courthouse (constructed in 1926) is a historic courthouse in LaBelle, Florida, located at the corner of Bridge Street and Hickpochee Avenue (then known as Palm Beach Boulevard). From then until 1968, the two- or three-story Mediterranean Revival and Mission Revival-style structure, which cost approximately $150,000 to build, served as the county courthouse for Hendry County.

Architect Edward Columbus Hosford served as the building's designer, while the Marshall-Jackson Company of Lakeland received the contract to build it, before declaring bankruptcy after the 1920s Florida land boom collapsed. On November 8, 1990, the Old Hendry County Courthouse was added to the U.S. National Register of Historic Places.

== History and description ==
Hendry County, Florida, was officially established on May 1, 1923, split from the east part of Lee County. The city of LaBelle, then the only incorporated municipality in the county, became the county seat. Commissioners of Hendry County soon began planning the construction of a courthouse, to be located on Palm Beach Boulevard and State Road 29 (present-day Hickpochee Avenue and Bridge Street), and selected Edward Columbus Hosford to be its architect. Prior to the construction of a permanent building dedicated to that purpose, court procedures occurred at Ford's Everett hotel on Bridge Street. Several months of discussions occurred regarding the plans for the courthouse, including a failed attempt to ditch the clocktower to save money.

Despite making the lowest bid at $129,000, the Marshall-Jackson Company of Lakeland received the contract for constructing the structure. After voters approved a $100,000 bond issue in November 1924, the county commission soon learned that that amount of money would not be sufficient. Two bills during a 1925 special session of the Florida Legislature led to the county receiving another $50,000 via bonds and time warrants. Other issues began surfacing despite obtaining enough funding and construction beginning in late 1925, including the contractor declaring bankruptcy after the Florida land boom collapsed. The courthouse opened in May 1927.

The South Florida Developer newspaper of Stuart reported that "the new court house is a [sic] something of beauty and substantial elegance inside as well as out." It is a two- to three-story brick building of the Mission and Mediterranean Revival-styles of architecture. Local lore surrounds the clock tower at the courthouse. A black farmer named Henry Patterson was murdered in June 1926 shortly after knocking on a white woman's door to ask for a cup of water, who instead screamed and ran away. After the men accused of murdering Patterson were acquitted, it was reported that lightning struck the clock tower several times. In one particular instance, in 1929, a large stone on the clock tower fell through into the building and nearly smashed a judge's bench, used by the same judge who acquitted Patterson's alleged killers.

This structure remained the county's courthouse until January 1968, when a new building opened. On November 8, 1990, the Old Hendry County Courthouse was added to the National Register of Historic Places.

== See also ==
- National Register of Historic Places listings in Hendry County, Florida
