= Muspa =

Total population
- Extinct as a tribe

Regions with significant populations
- Southeastern Florida, U.S.

Languages
- Calusa language

Religion
- Indigenous religion

Related ethnic groups
- other Calusa

Muspa was the name of a town and a group of Calusa people. They were Indigenous peoples in southwestern Florida in the early historic period, from first contact with the Spanish until the late 18th century.

== Town ==
The town of Muspa was probably on or near Marco Island, at the north end of the Ten Thousand Islands. One map placed Punta de Muspa at Cape Sable, but other maps placed it at Cape Romano, just south of Marco Island. The first recorded mention of Muspa was by Hernando de Escalante Fontaneda, who lived for many years as a captive of the Calusa until his rescue in 1566. Fonteneda named Muspa in two different lists (in his Memoir and Memorial) of towns subject to the Calusa chief. The position of the name on the lists implies that Muspa was somewhere on the southwest coast of Florida between the Calusa capitol, believed to have been Mound Key, and Cape Sable. Depositions given by Franciscan missionaries expelled by the Calusa Chief in 1697 also place Muspa on or near Marco Island. The town may have been located at the mouth of the Caloosahatchee River.

Marco Island is in the Ten Thousand Islands district of the Glades culture area, as defined in archeology. Around 1300, pottery and artifact styles on Marco Island changed to become very similar to those of the Caloosahatchee culture, practiced by the Calusa people to the north, indicating a close alliance with or absorption by the Calusa.

== Polity ==
Muspa was an important sub-chiefdom under the Calusa chief. In 1623 Muspa was named by the Spanish as one of five places in southern Florida they searched for treasure that may have been recovered by Florida Indians from the wrecked treasure fleet of 1622. When the Franciscan missionaries were expelled from the Calusa capital in 1697, they were escorted to the Florida Keys by the Chief of Muspa.

Muspa, along with all Calusa territory, was subject to frequent raids early in the 18th century by Muscogee and Yamasee people allied with English colonists in the Province of Carolina. Refugees from all of the Indigenous peoples of southern Florida tried to flee to Cuba. The Chief of Muspa was among 270 refugees who arrived in Cuba in 1711. Along with most of the other refugees, he died there shortly afterward.

== People ==
Historian Daniel Garrison Brinton wrote that the Muspa Indians lived on islands and along the shore of Boca Grande, Florida, into the late 18th century, until the Seminole pushed them into the Florida Keys. Dutch naturalist Bernard Romans wrote that the Calusa migrates to Cuba in 1763. However, another historian wrote that the Muspa still lived near Pine Island as late as 1835.

The Indigenous peoples of southern Florida, including the Muspa, were greatly reduced by the time Spain transferred its claims to Florida over to Britain in 1763. People living in the area of Charlotte Harbor in the 18th century and early 19th century were called "Muspa", and believed they were remnants of the Calusa. Indians living in the area were associated with Spanish-Cuban fishing ranchos, and historians have now concluded that, at least in the 19th century, most of those people were descendants of Muscogean people, who elsewhere in Florida became known as Seminoles.

In 1839, the Muspa joined in the Seminole Wars, and a band of Muspa attacked an American camp led by Colonel William S. Harney. They killed 18 of 30 men stationed there. Harney retaliated in July 1839, killed the chief of the "Spanish Indians" and hung six others. Ethnography John R. Swanton writes that the Calusa, and by extension the Muspa, disappear from history, although he believes some may have merged in the Seminole or emigrated to Cuba.

== See also ==
- Key Marco
- Caloosahatchee culture, 500 BCE–1750 CE
