= Fort Casey (Florida) =

Coordinates: 26.669517°N 82.246484°W

Fort Casey was a historical military post situated on Useppa Island in Charlotte Harbor, Florida in the mid-19th century. It was named after Captain John Charles Casey of the U.S. Army.

== History ==
In 1848, the War Department determined to select a site for a new fort at Charlotte Harbor, Florida to assist with the removal of Native Americans from the region. Fort Brooke commander Major W. W. Morris and Captain John Charles Casey, with other officers, examined the area between November 15–22, 1848, and then on January 20, 1849, recommended the Island of Giuseppe (now Useppa Island) as the most suitable location.

The post was established on January 3, 1850, with Brevet Major R.C. Gatlin as the first commander. 108 men of C and F Companies, 7th Infantry Regiment garrisoned the fort, with Brevet Second Lieutenant E.D. Stockton and First Lieutenant E. Van Dorn commanding the companies, respectively. C.H. Crane served as Assistant Surgeon.

On April 7, 1850, Brevet Major T.H. Holmes took command. Soon thereafter the 7th Infantry left for Missouri and 60 men from C Company, 4th Artillery replaced them.

On November 10, 1850, Brevet Brigadier General Thomas Childs of the 1st Artillery arrived and closed the post.

== Notable officers ==
Thomas "Stonewall" Jackson was stationed briefly at Fort Casey in 1850 as a young lieutenant.
