= Monroe Station (Ochopee, Florida) =

- Formerly listed on the U.S. National Register of Historic Places
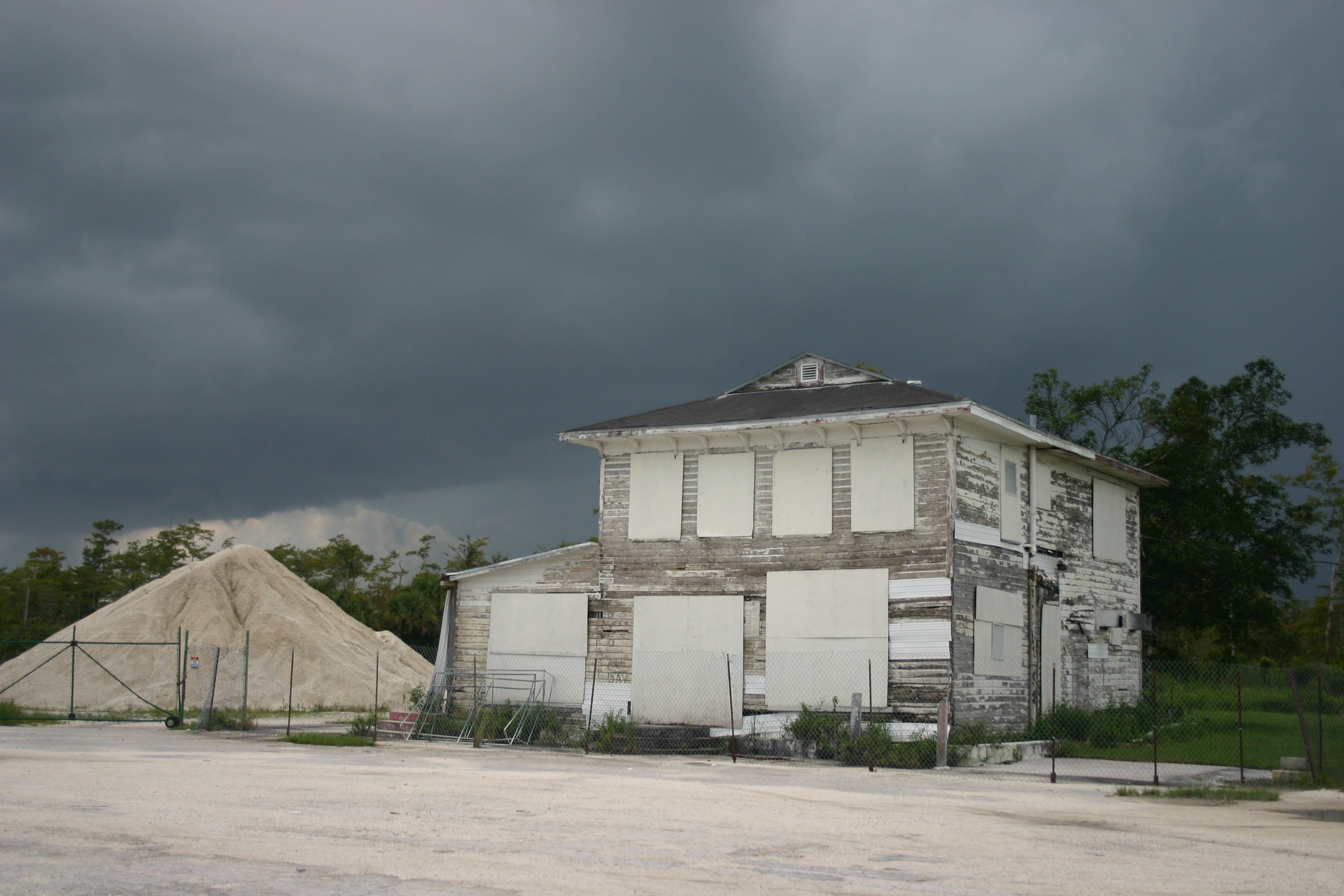

- Location within Florida Location within the United States
- Nearest city: Ochopee, Florida
- Coordinates: 25°51′46″N 81°6′1″W
- Area: 4.7 acres (1.9 ha)
- Architectural style: Late 19th And 20th Century Revivals
- Demolished: April 9, 2016
- NRHP reference No.: 00000427

Significant dates
- Added to NRHP: May 11, 2000
- Removed from NRHP: May 15, 2019

The Monroe Station was a historic gas station, restaurant and bar in Ochopee, Florida. It was located at the junction of Tamiami Trail and Loop Road. On May 11, 2000, it was added to the U.S. National Register of Historic Places. As of July 29, 2007, it was boarded up and abandoned.

Monroe Station burned to the ground April 9, 2016. It was delisted from the National Register on May 15, 2019.
