= Burns Lake Park =

Provincial park in British Columbia, Canada

Burns Lake Provincial Park
- IUCN category II (national park)
- Location within British Columbia
- Interactive map of Burns Lake Provincial Park
- Location: Range 5 Coast Land District, British Columbia, Canada
- Nearest city: Houston, BC
- Coordinates: 54°11′57″N 125°43′17″W
- Area: 65 ha (160 acres)
- Established: January 25, 2001
- Governing body: BC Parks

Burns Lake Park is a provincial park in British Columbia, Canada, located near the town of Burns Lake. The park was established per Order in Council 63 on January 25, 2001, and constitutes approximately 65 hectares (160 acres).
