= Key Marco =

Archaeological site in Florida, US

Coordinates: 25.9594°N 81.7281°W

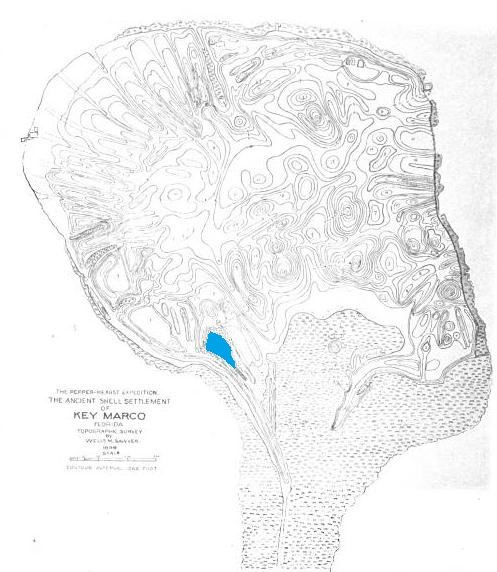
Map of Key Marco with "Court of the Pile Dwellers" marked in blue, from the Pepper-Hearst Expedition report

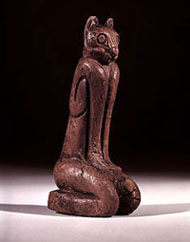
The Key Marco cat, artifact Catalogue No. A240915, Department of Anthropology, NMNH, Smithsonian Institution.

Key Marco was an archaeological site (8CR48) consisting of a large shell works island next to Marco Island, Florida. A small pond on Key Marco, now known as the "Court of the Pile Dwellers" (8CR49), (Note: 8CR48 designates the entire Key Marco site, while 8CR49 designates just the pond known at the "Court of the Pile Dwellers" within the Key Marco site.) was excavated in 1896 by the Smithsonian Institution's Pepper-Hearst Expedition, led by Frank Hamilton Cushing. Cushing recovered more than 1,000 wooden artifacts from the pond, the largest number of wooden artifacts from any prehistoric archaeological site in the eastern United States. These artifacts are described as some of the finest prehistoric Native American art in North America. The Key Marco materials are principally divided between the University of Pennsylvania Museum of Archaeology and Anthropology, University of Pennsylvania; the Department of Anthropology, National Museum of Natural History, Smithsonian Institution; and the Florida Museum of Natural History, University of Florida. The original pond was completely excavated and refilled. It is now covered by a housing subdivision. Excavations of small parts of the site were also conducted in 1965 and 1995.

== Names ==
The island of Key Marco was composed of shell mounds and other shell works and separate from Marco Island in the 19th century. A late 19th century settlement on the island was called Marco Village. The Olde Marco Inn on the north end of the island was founded in 1887. The name of the settlement on the island was changed to Collier City in 1927. By late in the 20th century Key Marco had been attached to Marco Island and all of the mounds on Key Marco had been leveled and built on. The area is now known as Old Marco Village. One source of confusion in the name is Marion Gilliland's use of "Key Marco" to refer to all of Marco Island. Another source of confusion arises from the fact that in the 1980s a development company renamed the former Horr's Island as "Key Marco". Horr's Island was the location of an independently significant archaeological site. It has one of the oldest indigenous burial mounds of the eastern United States, dating to about 1450 BCE; and it was the site of the largest, permanently occupied community of the Archaic period (8000 BCE- 1000 BCE) in the southeastern part of the nation.

== Pepper-Hearst excavation ==
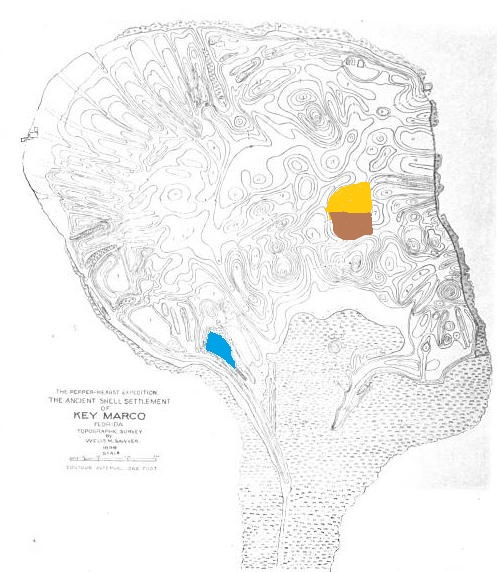
Map of Key Marco, showing the pond known as the "Court of the Pile Dwellers" in blue, the Van Beck excavation of 1964 in gold, and the Widmer excavation of 1995 in brown.

Water color painting by Wells Moses Sawyer of a carved and painted mask excavated from the "Court of the Pile Dwellers"

The "Court of the Pile Dwellers" (Note: The name "Court of the Pile Dwellers" refers to Cushing's proposal that the people of Key Marco had lived on pile dwellings over the water in the pond, based on finding many toppled pilings in the pond.) at Key Marco was a small muck pond, covering less than an acre. The conditions in the muck preserved the wood and other objects, including those made with bone, fiber, gum, rawhide and gut. Objects of stone, shell and pottery were also found in the pond.

A great variety of artifacts were found in the pond, including bowls, mortars and pestles, spears, atlatls, cords, ropes, nets, net floats, fishhooks, carved clubs, wooden tablets and plaques, wood ear spools, realistically carved animal heads, carved and painted masks, and a carved wooden feline/human figure, the so-called "Key Marco cat". Many of the wooden objects, besides the masks, had been painted. The colors were still vivid when the objects were first removed from the muck. The artifacts were very well preserved due to being buried in the wet conditions.

At the time the pond was excavated, techniques for preserving wood and other fragile materials removed from the muck had not been developed. The colors on the painted objects quickly faded, and many objects quickly deteriorated. But, a photographer with the excavation party recorded all the objects soon after they were removed from the pond, thus preserving evidence of their appearance. Watercolors were also prepared by Wells M. Sawyer showing the colors of the painted objects.

Dating the finds from the "Court of the Pile Dwellers" has been a problem. Because of the limited knowledge of the archaeological discipline at the time, no record of the stratification of the objects was kept. They cannot be placed in sequence. There is no sign of European trade goods or influence in the finds. Radiocarbon dating did not exist at the time of excavation. Radiocarbon dating of objects which have been handled and stored away from their original environment for long periods may not be reliable. In the 1960s an attempt to radiocarbon date some objects yielded a date of 1670 AD. A second attempt in 1975 using five different objects yielded dates from 55 AD to 850 AD.

== Van Beck excavation ==
In 1965 Van Beck and Van Beck excavated part of a 4.5 metres (15 ft) tall mound about 200 metres (660 ft) northeast of the "Court of the Pile Dwellers". Two test pits yielded a large number of potsherds in distinct strata. The potsherds all belong to the Glades periods II and III. The density of the potsherds indicates that the Key Marco site had a high population density, and presumably political complexity during both Glades period II and III.

== Widmer excavation ==
In 1995 the Collier County Historical Society commissioned an archaeological salvage project on an undeveloped portion of Key Marco, supervised by archaeologists Randolph J. Widmer and Rebecca Storey, who trained and led a volunteer labor effort, in association with related organizations. They hoped to be able to establish more context for the archaeological site excavated by Cushing. Evidence was found of three platform mound stages, with large houses built on pilings. A stratigraphic analysis found 55 discrete layers, indicated by changes in shell and sand mixture. They found evidence of numerous postholes, which indicated a large structure built on pilings to raise it above the surface of the mound. They found additional evidence of early Glades culture, mostly through pottery remains.

== Ethnic affiliation ==
Marco Island was occupied by the Muspa people, corresponding to the Ten Thousand Islands district of the Glades culture as defined in archaeology. Around 1300 AD, pottery and artifact styles in the Muspa area changed to become very similar to those of the Calusa people to the north, indicating a close alliance with or absorption by the Calusa.

== See also ==
- Fort Center
- Turner River Site
