= Hinson Mounds =

- U.S. National Register of Historic Places
- Location within Florida Location within the United States
- Location: Collier County, Florida
- Nearest city: Miles City
- NRHP reference No.: 78000345
- Added to NRHP: December 29, 1978

The Hinson Mounds (8Cr180) comprise an archeological site in Collier County, Florida near Miles City. It is located three miles northeast of Miles City. The mounds were estimated to have been used for burial from 400 - 900 AD, and they were part of the Glades culture. Excavation of the mounds, which were found on a hardwood hammock island, has produced evidence of prehistoric Native American occupation.

On December 29, 1978, the site was added to the U.S. National Register of Historic Places.

== See also ==
- List of burial mounds in the United States
