= Caloosahatchee culture =

Archaeological culture in Florida, US

The Caloosahatchee culture is an archaeological culture on the Gulf coast of Southwest Florida.

The Caloosahatchee culture region lasted from 500 BCE to 1750, and has been divided into five periods based on ceramic styles. Its territory consisted of the coast from what is now southern Sarasota County through all of Charlotte and Lee counties to the northern edge of Collier County, approximately 40 kilometres (25 mi) north of Marco Island, and about 90 kilometres (56 mi) inland from the coast. The area from Charlotte Harbor to the Ten Thousand Islands has been informally called the Calusa region. At the time of first European contact, the Caloosahatchee culture region formed the core of the Calusa domain.

Some Archaic artifacts have been found in the Caloosahatchee culture region, including one site classified as early Archaic. There is evidence that Charlotte Harbor aquatic resources were being intensively exploited before 3500 BCE. Undecorated pottery belonging to the early Glades culture appeared in the region around 500 BCE. Pottery distinct from the Glades tradition developed in the Caloosahatchee region around 500 AD, and a complex society with high population densities developed by 800 AD. Later periods in the Caloosahatchee culture are defined by the appearance of pottery from other traditions in the archaeological record.

The coast in the Caloosahatchee culture region is a very rich estuarine environment. An extensive network of bays and sounds are protected behind barrier islands. The Caloosahatchee, Myakka and Peace rivers flow into the estuary. There are extensive areas of mangrove and seagrass in the estuary, resulting in high biological production.

The people of the Caloosahatchee culture built mounds. Some of the mounds in Caloosahatchee settlements were undisturbed shell middens, but other were constructed from midden and earth materials. The hundreds of sites identified range from simple small middens to complex sites with earthwork platform mounds, plazas, "water courts", causeways, and canals. Mound Key, in the middle of Estero Bay, covers 70–80 acres (28–32 ha), and includes mounds up to 31 feet (9.4 m) tall. A canal penetrates more than halfway into Mound Key, passing between two mounds and ending in a roughly rectangular pool.

The Caloosahatchee people derived 80% to 90% of their animal food from fish. Shellfish, including crabs were also important. Minor components of their diet included white-tailed deer, other mammals, waterfowl such as ducks, American alligators, turtles, West Indian manatees and sea urchins. Plants collected as food included various wild roots, mastic fruit, prickly pear cactus fruit, palm fruits, sea grapes, hogplum, and cocoplum.

Tools and ornaments made of wood, bone, stone and shell have been found. Perforated stones and plummets (oblong stones with a groove incised around one end) of limestone are thought to have been used as fishing net weights. Dippers, cups, spoons, beads, cutting-edge tools and hammers were made from shells. Awls, beads, pendants, pins, gorges, barbs, and points were made from bone. Ceremonial tablets were incised on non-native stone (presumably imported from other areas).

Although outside the Caloosahatchee region proper, the artifacts found at Key Marco are closely related. These include many wood objects and cordage. The cordage found at Key Marco, probably of palm fiber, was primarily used in fishing nets. Wood artifacts found at Key Marco included masks, painted carvings of animals, incised and painted tablets and toy/model canoes.

== Sources ==
- Marquardt, William H. (1992). "Recent Archaeological and Paleoenvironmental Investigations in Southwest Florida". In Marquardt, William H. (ed.). Culture and Environment in the Domain of the Calusa (PDF). Claudine Payne. Gainesville, Florida: Institute of Archaeology and Paleoenvironmental Studies, University of Florida. pp. 9–57. ISBN 1-881448-00-2 – via University of Florida Libraries.
- Milanich, Jerald T. (1994). Archaeology of Precolumbian Florida. Gainesville, Florida: University Press of Florida. ISBN 0-8130-1273-2.
- Milanich, Jerald T. (1995). Florida Indians and the Invasion from Europe. Gainesville, Florida: University Press of Florida. ISBN 0-8130-1360-7.
- Anon. 1993. "Chapter 10. The Caloosahatchee Region", in Milanich, Jerald, Ed. Florida Historical Contexts. State of Florida Division of Historical Resources. - retrieved March 29, 2006
