= Halfway Creek (Indiana) =

Stream in Indiana, U.S.

Coordinates: 40°17′44″N 85°14′21″W

Halfway Creek is a stream in the U.S. state of Indiana.

Halfway Creek received its name from its location midway between Portland and Muncie.

== See also ==
- List of rivers of Indiana
