= Rock Mound Archeological Site =

- U.S. National Register of Historic Places
- Location within Florida Location within the United States
- Location: Key Largo, Florida
- Coordinates: 25.13°N 80.41°W
- NRHP reference No.: 75000562
- Added to NRHP: July 1, 1975

The Rock Mound Archeological Site is an archaeological site in Key Largo, Florida. It is located a half mile west of U.S. 1. On July 1, 1975, it was added to the U.S. National Register of Historic Places.
