= Platt Island =

- U.S. National Register of Historic Places

- Location within Florida Location within the United States
- Location: Collier County, Florida
- Nearest city: Miles City
- Coordinates: 26.212863°N 81.304242°W
- NRHP reference No.: 78000934
- Added to NRHP: December 14, 1978

Platt Island is an archaeological site off Florida State Road 29 in Collier County north of Miles City. It was added to the U.S. National Register of Historic Places in 1978. Ceramic fragments dated to about 2500 years old were found at the site, which is in the Big Cypress National Preserve.
