= Plaza Site =

- U.S. National Register of Historic Places
- Location within Florida Location within the United States
- Location: Collier County, Florida
- Nearest city: Ochopee
- Coordinates: 25.90°N 81.30°W
- NRHP reference No.: 86001196
- Added to NRHP: May 28, 1986

The Plaza Site is an archaeological site near Ochopee, Florida. It is located in the Big Cypress National Preserve. On May 28, 1986, it was added to the U.S. National Register of Historic Places.
