= Turner River Site =

Archaeological site in Florida, United States

- U.S. National Register of Historic Places
- Location within Florida Location within the United States
- Location: Collier County, Florida
- Nearest city: Chokoloskee
- Coordinates: 25.90°N 81.30°W
- NRHP reference No.: 78000263
- Added to NRHP: December 14, 1978

The Turner River Site (8CR8) is an archaeological site in the Ten Thousand Islands region of Everglades National Park, in Florida. It is listed on the U.S. National Register of Historic Places.

The Turner River Site is a large shell works site .5 miles (0.80 km) from the mouth of the Turner River, near Chokoloskee Island. The site covers 30 acres (12 ha) and is .25 miles (0.40 km) long. It has at least 30 closely spaced mounds. The site was the first in the Ten Thousand Islands area to be excavated by professional archaeologists.

The Turner River Site came to the attention of archaeologists in 1900. Aleš Hrdlička visited the site in 1918. He declared it to be "important to science", and urged that it be made a "national reservation." William H. Sears conducted the first excavation by a professional archaeologist in 1955. He noted structural features similar to those found at Key Marco and Chokoloskee Island, and concluded that the region was an "important prehistoric population center." Sears found muck with midden materials between the mounds and on the lower slopes of the mounds, but the bulk of the mounds were clean shell deposits, almost entirely made up of small oyster shells, which had been placed on submerged mud flats. Based on dating of potsherds found at the site, Sears concluded that the residents of the site had lived on the edge of the river, moving the village towards the water as the mounds built up behind them. All of the potsherds collected at the site were assigned to the Glades I and II periods, placing occupation of the site in the period from about 200 or 100 BCE to 800 or 900 CE.

The Turner River Site was added to the National Register of Historic Places in 1978.
