= Sugar Pot Site =

- U.S. National Register of Historic Places
- Location within Florida Location within the United States
- Location: Collier County, Florida
- Nearest city: Ochopee
- Coordinates: 25.90°N 81.30°W
- Area: 5 acres (2.0 ha)
- NRHP reference No.: 78000264
- Added to NRHP: December 15, 1978

The Sugar Pot Site is an archaeological site near Ochopee, Florida. It is located in the Big Cypress National Preserve. On December 15, 1978, it was added to the U.S. National Register of Historic Places.
