= C. J. Ostl Site =

- U.S. National Register of Historic Places
- Location within Florida Location within the United States
- Location: Ochopee, Florida
- Coordinates: 25.90°N 81.30°W
- NRHP reference No.: 78003380
- Added to NRHP: 15 December 1978

The C. J. Ostl Site is an archaeological site in Ochopee, Florida. It is located off U.S. 41, near Fifty-Mile Bend. On December 15, 1978, it was added to the U.S. National Register of Historic Places.
