= Halfway Creek Site =

- U.S. National Register of Historic Places
- Location within Florida Location within the United States
- Location: Collier County, Florida
- Nearest city: Carnestown
- Coordinates: 25.91°N 81.36°W
- NRHP reference No.: 80000365
- Added to NRHP: August 15, 1980

The Halfway Creek Site is an archaeological site located near Carnestown, Florida. On August 15, 1980, it was added to the U.S. National Register of Historic Places.
