= Burns Lake Site =

- U.S. National Register of Historic Places
- Location: Ochopee, Florida
- Coordinates: Address restricted
- NRHP reference No.: 86001192
- Added to NRHP: 27 May 1986

The Burns Lake Site is a historic site in Ochopee, Florida. It is located three miles west of Ochopee on U.S. 41. On May 27, 1986, it was added to the U.S. National Register of Historic Places.
