= Florida State Road 29 =

Highway in Florida, US

State Road 29
- SR 29 highlighted in red, CR 29 highlighted in blue

Route information
- Maintained by FDOT
- Length: 75.820 mi (122.020 km)

Major junctions
- South end: US 41 / CR 29 at Carnestown
- I-75 Toll in Miles City; SR 82 near Immokalee; SR 80 in LaBelle
- North end: US 27 near Palmdale

Location
- Country: United States
- State: Florida
- Counties: Collier, Hendry, Glades

Highway system
- Florida State Highway System; Interstate; US; State; Former; Pre‑1945; Toll; Scenic
← US 29	→ SR 30

State Road 29 (SR 29) is a state highway that runs north–south through Southwest Florida. It begins in Carnestown (just north of Everglades City) and runs north to a point just south of Palmdale. A rural road, it runs mostly through uninhabited farmland in its northern half, and along wetlands in its southern half. The route previously continued south of Carnestown to Everglades City and Chokoloskee, which has since become County Road 29 (CR 29).

== Route description ==
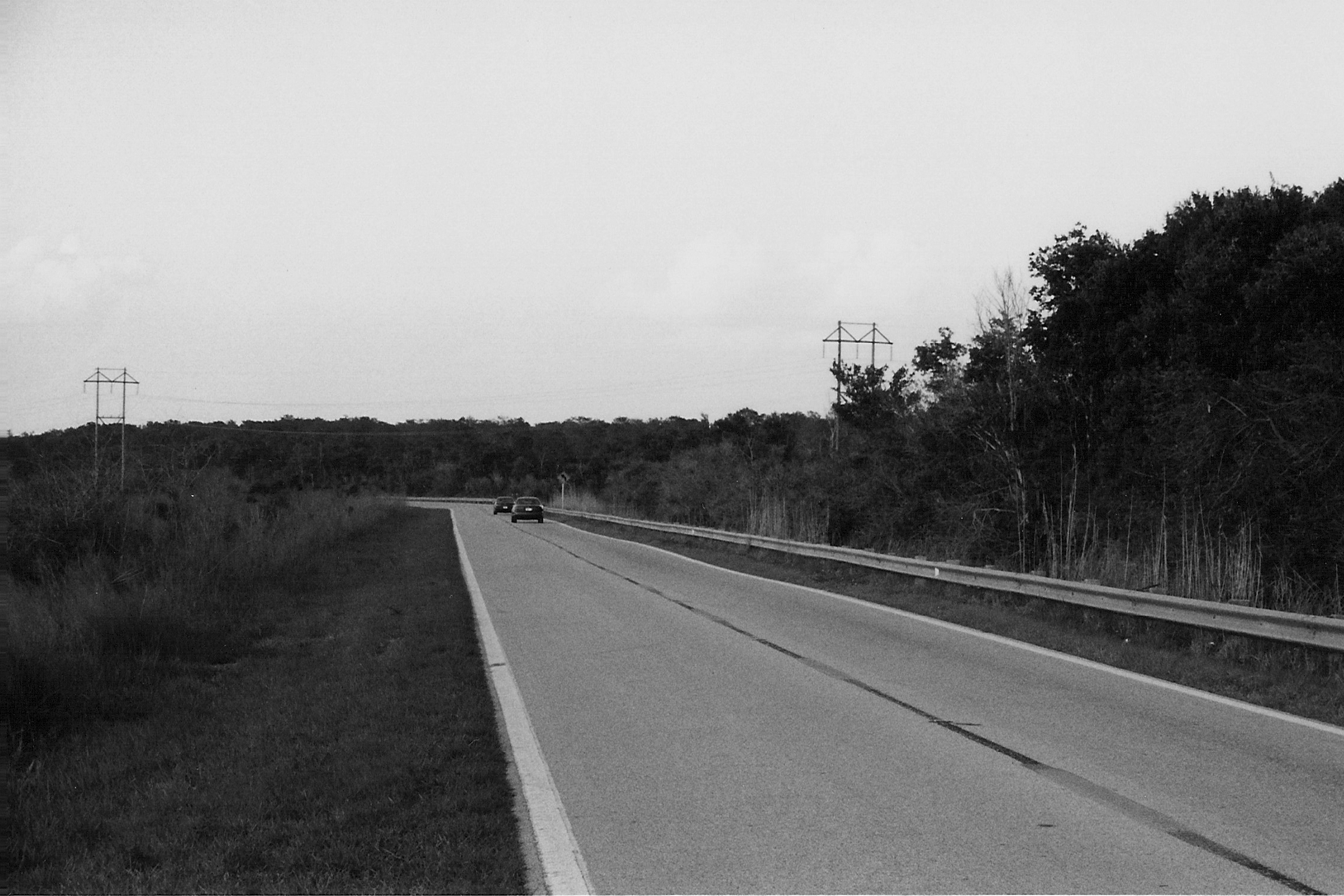
Florida State Road 29, just north of US Route 41 in Carnestown

=== County Road 29 ===
CR 29 begins on Chokoloskee Island at SR 29's historic southern terminus, where it known as Smallwood Avenue (named for Ted Smallwood, who opened the areas historic general store which is now a museum). From Chokoloksee, CR 29 crosses a causeway across Chokoloskee Bay to Everglades City. In Everglades City, it turns east along Broadway and north along Collier Avenue, where it continues out of the city and terminating at U.S. Route 41 in Carnestown.

=== State Road 29 ===
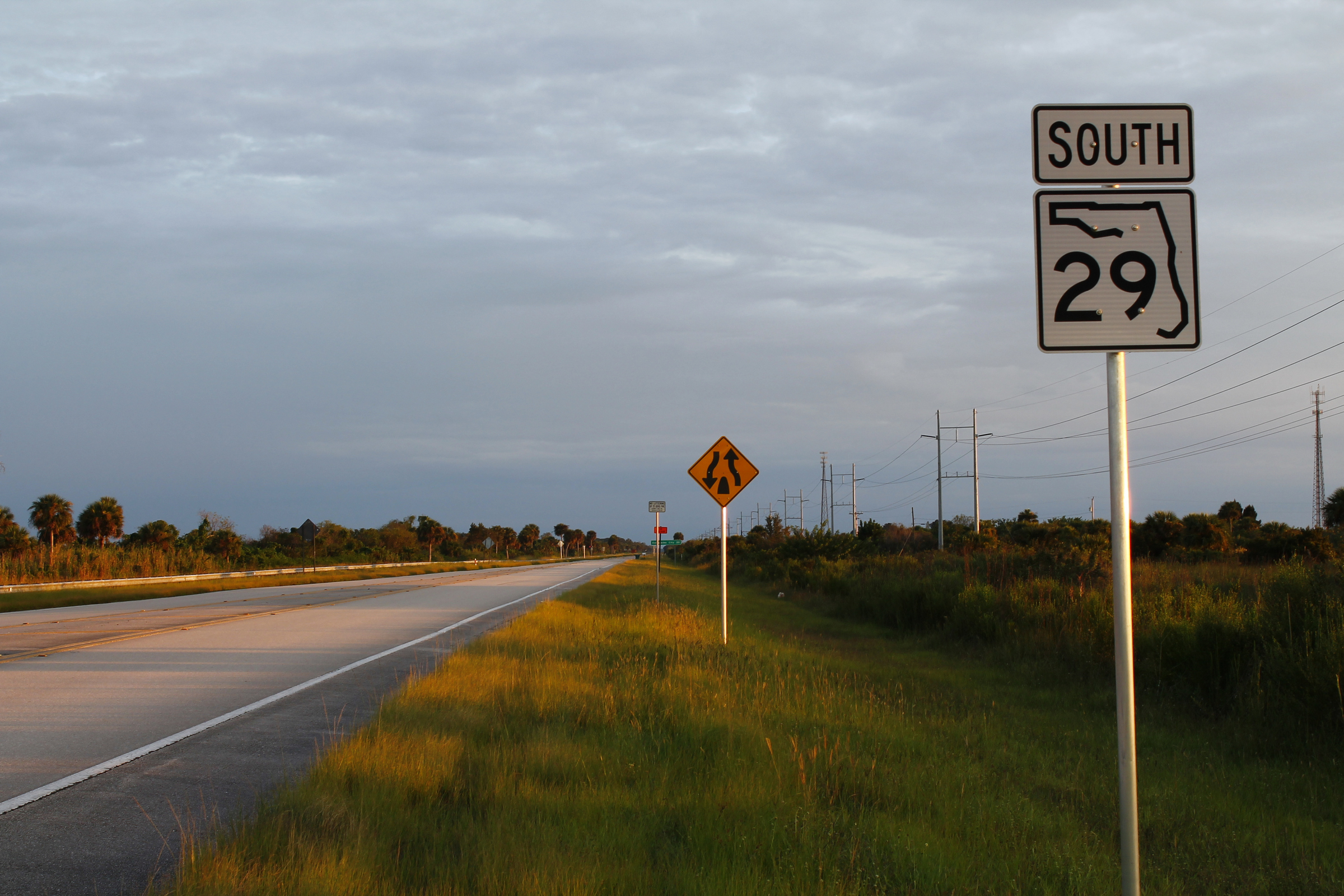
A Florida State Road 29 sign located in Miles City, just south of Interstate 75.

SR 29 officially begins at an intersection with U.S. Route 41 (Tamiami Trail) in Carnestown. From there, it travels north along the western edge of the Big Cypress National Preserve and the eastern edge of the Fakahatchee Strand Preserve State Forest, which the road borders until it reaches Interstate 75 (Alligator Alley) at Miles City.

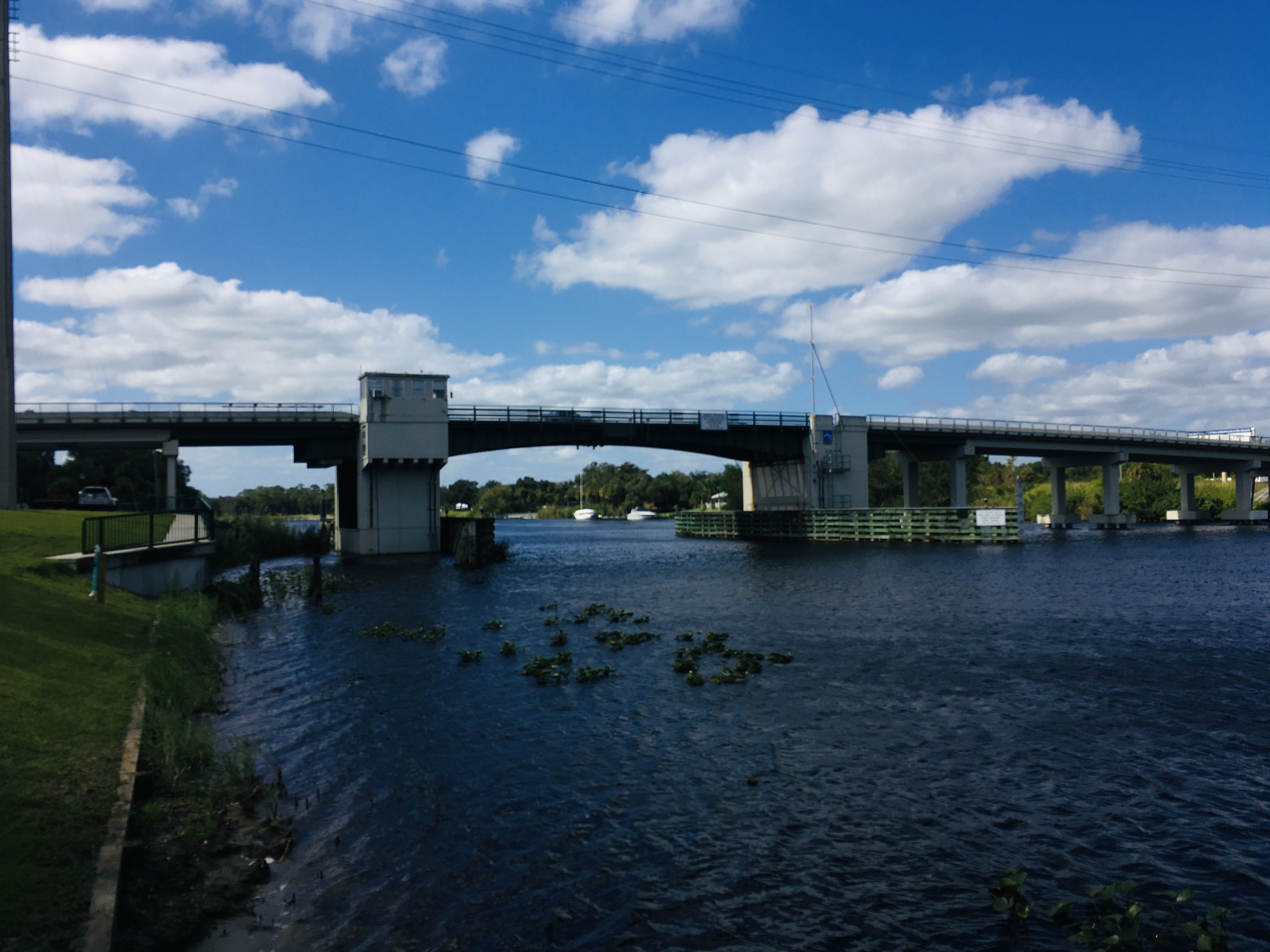
SR 29 drawbridge over the Caloosahatchee River in LaBelle, Florida

North of I-75, State Road 29 borders the Florida Panther National Wildlife Refuge to the west and continues to border the Big Cypress National Preserve up to a point just south of Sunniland.

SR 29 turns west briefly and back north through the city of Immokalee, a small farming town with large migrant populations. SR 29 expands to four lanes in as it passes through central Immokalee along Main Street and North 15th Street. Just north of Immokalee, SR 29 is reduced to two lanes before intersecting with State Road 82, which travels west to Fort Myers.

SR 29 continues due north through more agricultural areas until it reaches the city of LaBelle. SR 29 enters LaBelle along Main Street. It then comes to an intersection with SR 80, a transpeninsular route connecting Fort Myers and West Palm Beach. SR 29 then turns east along SR 80 for one block before turning north again at Bridge Street. SR 29 then crosses the Caloosahatchee River on a bascule drawbridge.

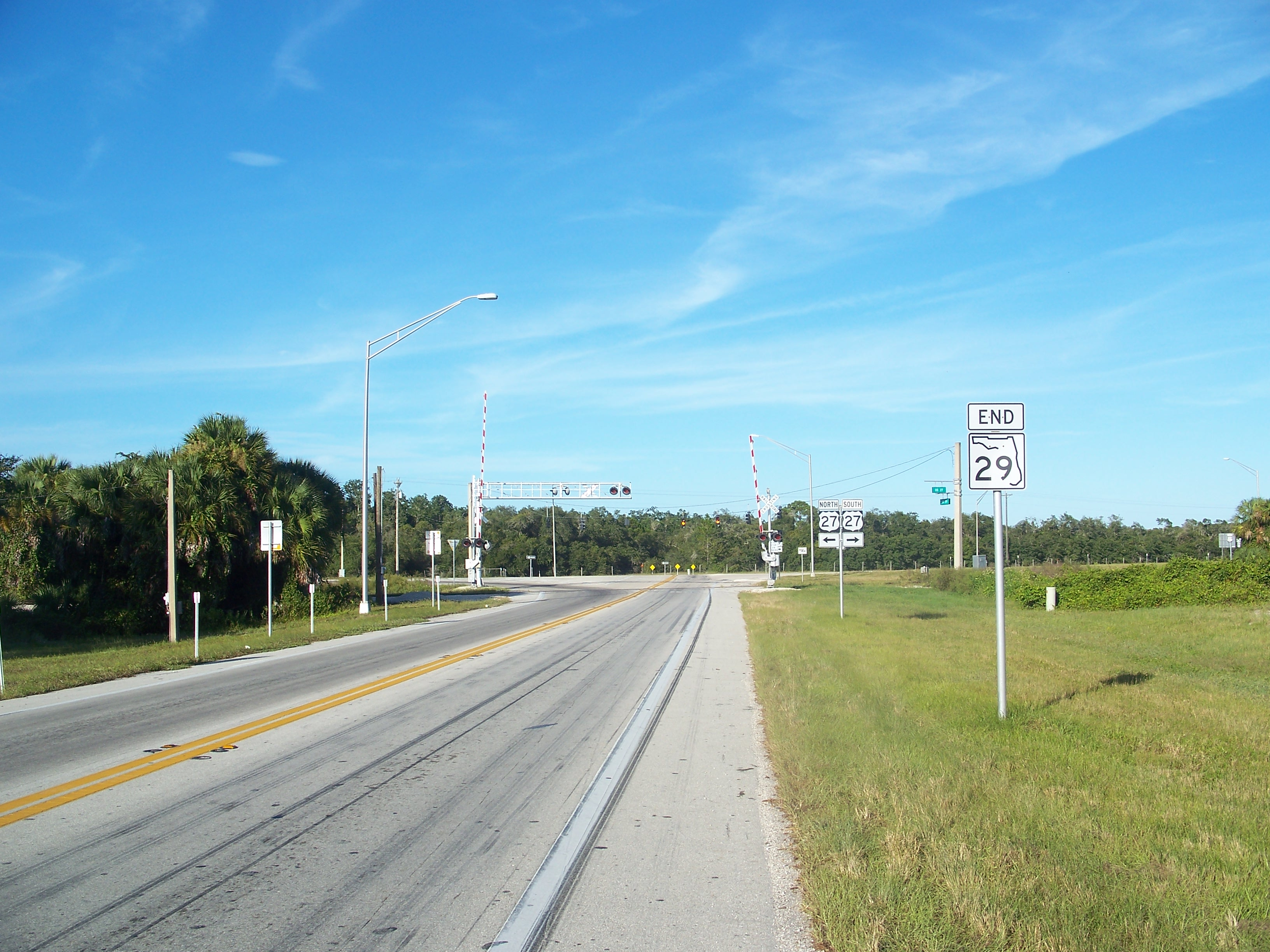
North end of State Road 29

On the north side of the river, SR 29 intersects CR 78 and SR 78 before continuing north through rural Glades County. SR 29 comes to its northern terminus at an intersection with US 27 (unsigned SR 25), just south of Palmdale.

== History ==
Present-day State Road 29 initially ran from LaBelle to Immokalee. It was extended from Immokalee to Everglades City (originally known as simply Everglades) in the 1920s around the same time as the construction of the Tamiami Trail. The extension was championed by Barron Collier as a land connection to Everglades City (the county seat of Collier County at the time). The route from Immokalee to Everglades City was built alongside the now-abandoned Atlantic Coast Line Railroad Haines City Branch from Harrisburg (just south of Palmdale) to Everglades City, which was also built in the 1920s. Part of this line was once the Deep Lake Railroad, which was once owned by Barron Collier. The railroad was removed from Sunniland south to Everglades City in 1957, and the rest of it was removed in the 1980s.

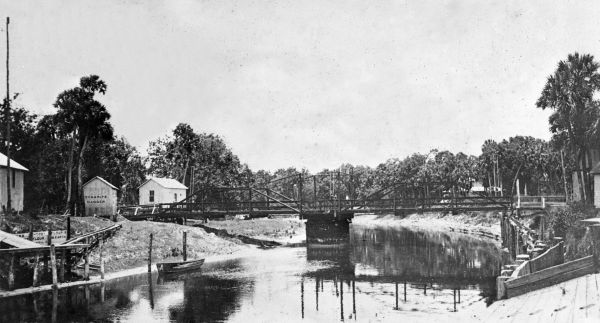
Former SR 29 swing bridge over Caloosahatchee River in LaBelle

SR 29 was originally designated SR 164 from Everglades City to LaBelle, which continued north from LaBelle along what is now Fire Tower Road. SR 164 was redesignated as SR 29 from Everglades City to LaBelle during the 1945 Florida State Road renumbering. SR 29 was extended from the north side of the Caloosahatchee River north of LaBelle to its current northern terminus at US 27 near Palmdale by 1950. At the south end, SR 29 was extended from Everglades City to Chokoloskee in 1956 upon the completion of a causeway across Chokoloskee Bay.

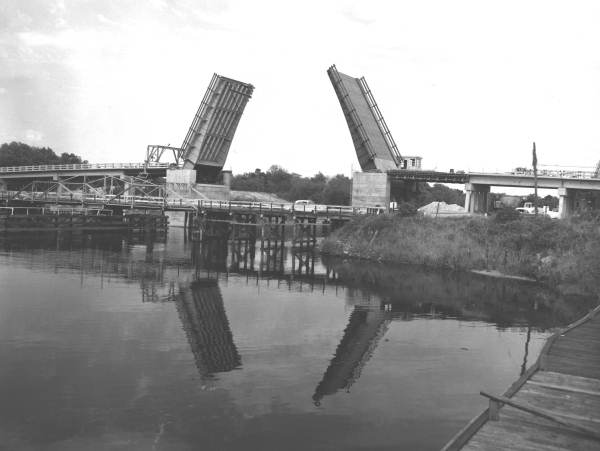
SR 29 Bascule bridge over Caloosahatchee River under construction with original swing bridge in front of it

SR 29's current bascule bridge over the Caloosahatchee River in LaBelle was built in 1959, replacing a swing bridge. The swing bridge was just west of the bascule bridge connecting Desoto Avenue and Main Street on the south side and North Bridge Street on the north side of the river. The construction of the bascule bridge resulted in the realignment of SR 29 from Main Street to Bridge Street in LaBelle.

The Florida Department of Transportation removed a large number of State Roads from its list for state control and maintenance to county control in the 1980s. SR 29 south of US 41 to Everglades City and Chokoloskee was given to county control at this time, becoming CR 29.

When plans were made to upgrade Alligator Alley to carry Interstate 75 in 1973, State Road 29 was not initially planned to have an interchange with the freeway due to environmental concerns. This decision was reversed in 1989 during construction of I-75 and interchange ramps were included after steps were taken to protect the endangered Florida panther.

== Major intersections ==
County	Location	mi	km	Destinations	Notes
Collier	Carnestown	0.000	0.000	US 41 (Tamiami Trail) / CR 29 south – Miami, Naples	
Collier	Copeland	2.495	4.015	CR 837 west (Janes Scenic Drive) – Fakahatchee Strand State Preserve	
Collier		3.844	6.186	CR 837 east (Wagon Wheel Road)	
Collier	Miles City	16.98	27.33	I-75 Toll (SR 93) – Naples, Fort Lauderdale	Exit 80 on I-75
Collier		27.208	43.787	CR 858 – Ave Maria, Hendry Correctional Institution	
Collier	Immokalee	36.770	59.176	CR 846 east – Airport	
Collier	Immokalee	36.902	59.388	CR 29A north (Newmarket Road East)	
Collier	Immokalee	37.309	60.043	CR 846 west (1st Street) – Naples, Bonita Springs, Seminole Casino, Corkscrew Swamp Sanctuary	
Collier	Immokalee	39.183	63.059	CR 890 west (Lake Trafford Road) – Ann Olesky Park on Lake Trafford	
Collier	Immokalee	39.761	63.989	CR 29A east (Newmarket Road West)	
Collier		41.231	66.355	CR 894 west (Experimental Road)	
Collier		42.798	68.877	SR 82 west – Fort Myers	
Hendry		45.829	73.755	CR 830A east	
Hendry	Felda	46.777	75.280	CR 830 east	
Hendry		50.415	81.135	CR 832 east (Keri Road) – Okaloacoochee Slough State Forest	
Hendry	LaBelle	60.713	97.708	SR 29 Truck north (North Bridge Street) to SR 80 east – Florida Southwestern State College	
Hendry	LaBelle	60.806	97.858	CR 80A (West Cowboy Way)	
Hendry	LaBelle	61.828	99.503	SR 80 west (Hickpochee Avenue) – Alva	South end of SR 80 overlap
Hendry	LaBelle	61.893	99.607	SR 80 east (Hickpochee Avenue) / SR 29 Truck south (Bridge Street) – Clewiston	North end of SR 80 overlap
Hendry		62.42	100.46	LaBelle Drawbridge over Caloosahatchee River (Okeechobee Waterway)	
Hendry		62.878	101.192	CR 78 west – Fort Denaud	
Hendry–Glades county line		63.383	102.005	To CR 731 / Whidden Road	
Glades		65.888	106.036	SR 78 east – Moore Haven	
Glades		75.056	120.791	CR 74 west – Punta Gorda	
Glades		75.820	122.020	US 27 (SR 25) – Palmdale, Moore Haven	
1.000 mi = 1.609 km; 1.000 km = 0.621 mi: Concurrency terminus

== Related routes ==
=== LaBelle truck route ===
State Road 29 Truck
- Location: LaBelle

State Road 29 Truck is a truck detour along South Bridge Street. It begins at the northwest corner of LaBelle Airport south of the southeast corner of SR 29 and CR 80A. SR 29 Truck also intersects CR 80A, and runs along the east side of SR 29 until it reaches SR 80 near the Old Hendry County Courthouse.

=== County Road 29A (Collier County) ===
New Market Road
- Location: Immokalee

County Road 29A is a route bypassing Immokalee to the northeast. It runs mostly southeast to northwest, and is named New Market Road.

County Road 29A begins as New Market Road East, as a straight south to north road until it approaches a local fire station on the northeast corner of an access road to Immokalee Airport, and curves to the northwest. The road serves as the headquarters for the Immokalee State Farmer's Market. At Charlotte Street New Market Road East becomes New Market Road West. The straight northwestern to southeastern pattern continues until it curves to the west and approaches the terminus at SR 29 and Westclox Road north of the city, but not before a northbound turning ramp forks off to the right.

=== County Road 29A (Hendry County) ===
North Main Street
- Location: LaBelle

County Road 29A is a short, former segment of SR 29 in LaBelle. It runs north along North Main Street from the SR 29/80 multiplex at the Old Hendry County Courthouse to Park Avenue, where it turns east terminating a block later at Bridge Street (SR 29) at the foot of the drawbridge over Caloosahatchee River. This segment of Main Street is the former alignment of SR 29 when the old swing bridge over the river was in service.
