= Carnestown, Florida =

- Unincorporated area
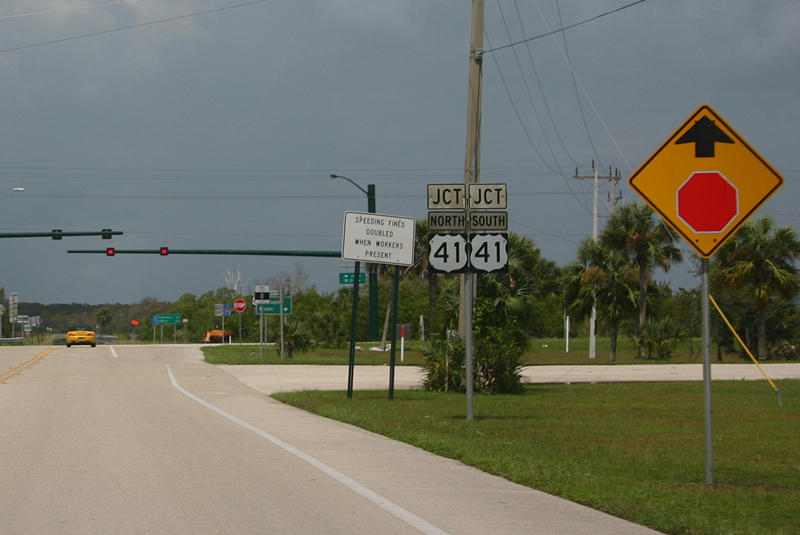

- Location within the state of Florida Carnestown (the United States)
- Coordinates: 25°54′39″N 81°21′51″W
- Country: United States
- State: Florida
- County: Collier
- Elevation: 3 ft (0.91 m)
- Time zone: UTC-5 (Eastern (EST))
  - Summer (DST): UTC-4 (EDT)
- GNIS feature ID: 295178

Carnestown is an unincorporated area in Collier County, Florida, United States, located at the intersection of United States Route 41 and State Road 29. The area is named for Juliet Gordon Carnes (1884-1971), whom Barron Collier, the county's namesake, married in 1907.

Before the 1920s, Carnestown was the endpoint of the Tamiami Trail from Southwest Florida; those wishing to continue to Everglades City or Miami had to abandon their vehicles and travel on foot. During the 1920s, Carnestown served as a major workcamp for the connection of the trail. After construction was completed, Carnestown was demolished between 1928 and 1929.
