= Miles City, Florida =

- Unincorporated community
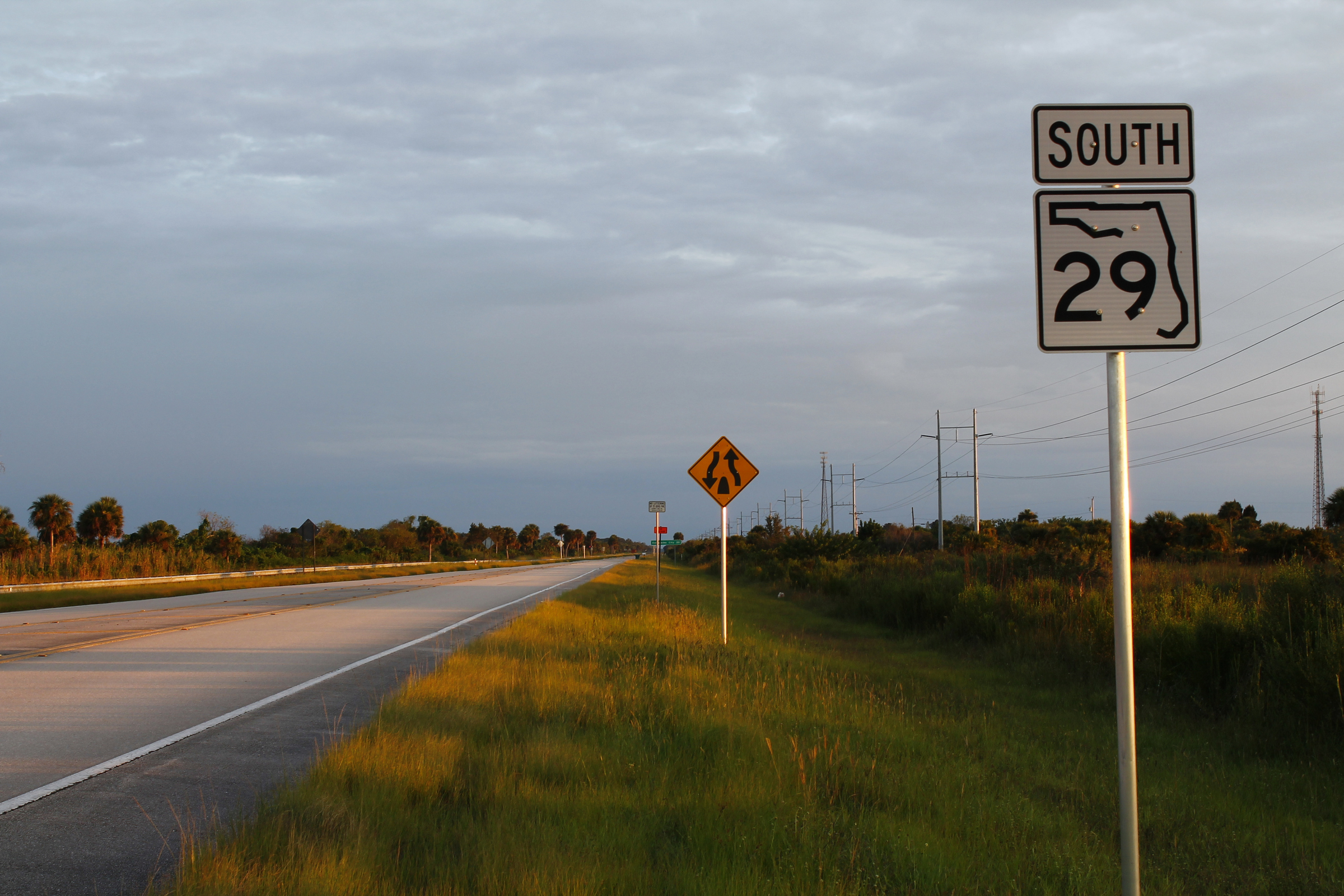
- FL 29 sign near the intersection with I-75

- Location within the state of Florida Miles City (the United States)
- Coordinates: 26°09′15″N 81°20′40″W
- Country: United States
- State: Florida
- County: Collier
- Elevation: 13 ft (4.0 m)
- Time zone: UTC-5 (Eastern (EST))
  - Summer (DST): UTC-4 (EDT)
- GNIS feature ID: 295450

Miles City is an unincorporated community in Collier County, Florida, United States, located near the intersection of the Alligator Alley portion of Interstate 75 and State Road 29. The community is part of the Naples–Marco Island Metropolitan Statistical Area. The name came from Miles Collier (1914-1954), son of area land owner Barron Collier.

Miles City opened in the 1920s and was home to dozens of families who worked at the Roskey Packing Plant. It was also a former stop on the Atlantic Coast Line Railroad (Harrisburg-Everglades City branch).

== Roads ==
- Alligator Alley (Interstate 75)
- Florida State Road 29

== See also ==
- Miles City, Montana
