= Ochopee, Florida =

- Unincorporated community
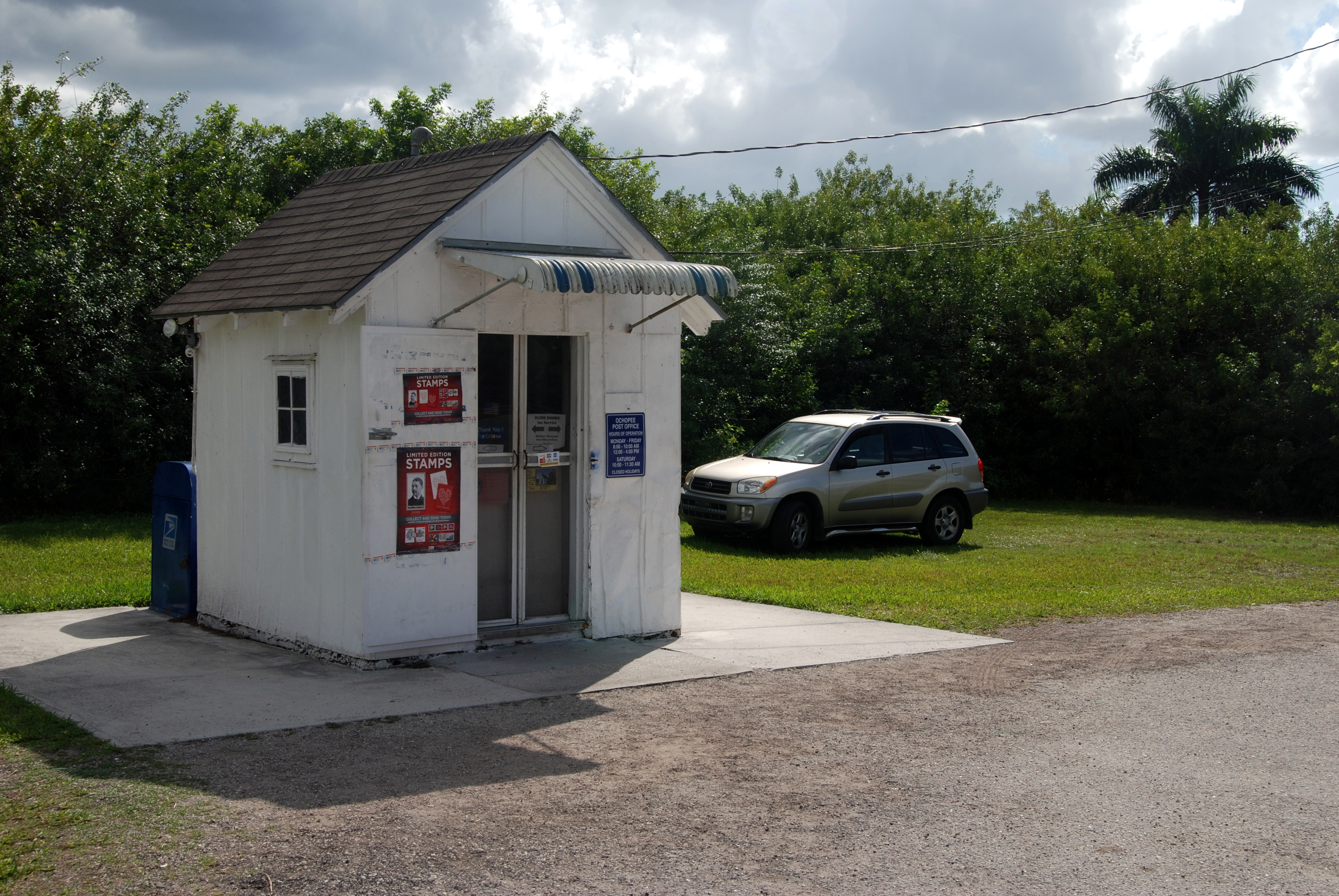
- Ochopee Post Office

- Location within the state of Florida Ochopee (the United States)
- Coordinates: 25°54′05″N 81°18′12″W
- Country: United States
- State: Florida
- County: Collier
- Elevation: 3 ft (0.91 m)
- Time zone: UTC-5 (Eastern (EST))
  - Summer (DST): UTC-4 (EDT)
- ZIP code: 34141
- Area code: 239
- GNIS feature ID: 295500

Ochopee is an unincorporated community in Collier County, Florida, United States. It is located to the east of the intersection of US 41 and State Road 29, near Carnestown. The community is part of the Naples–Marco Island Metropolitan Statistical Area.

The community got its name when a visitor to the general store asked the owner what the place was called. A native man was trading in the store that day so the owner asked him the Seminole word for farm. The farmer replied, "O-Chopp-ee".

Ochopee began as a one-family tomato-farming community in the early 1920s. James Gaunt bought 240 acres (97 ha) of land along U.S. Highway 41 for $100 per acre, and started with only army tents. A community called Ochopee grew up around Gaunt's tomato farm.

After the original post office burned down, residents used an old storage shed to house mail. Now the Ochopee Post Office, it is the smallest in the nation. It continues as an active post office and sometime tourist attraction.

The original farm and settlement were gradually absorbed by the federal government as part of a movement to conserve the Everglades. A few small businesses remain, along with the headquarters of the Big Cypress National Preserve. Jeff Whichello, a native of the area, has written a book about his childhood called What Happened to Ochopee?

== Detention center ==
In July 2025, South Florida Detention Facility, a detention, processing, and deportation facility for undocumented migrants was installed at the little-used airstrip in Ochopee. In June 2026, however, Florida governor Ron DeSantis confirmed that the detention center would close operations.

== Points of interest ==
- Ochopee Post Office
- Skunk Ape Research Center
- National Park Service Big Cypress Headquarters
