= National Register of Historic Places listings in Everglades National Park =

This is a list of the National Register of Historic Places listings in Everglades National Park.

This is intended to be a complete list of the properties and districts on the National Register of Historic Places in Everglades National Park, Florida, United States. The locations of National Register properties and districts for which the latitude and longitude coordinates are included below, may be seen in a Google map.

There are eleven properties and districts listed on the National Register in the park, one of which is a National Historic Landmark.

This National Park Service list is complete through NPS recent listings posted June 27, 2025.

== Current listings ==
| | Name on the Register | Image | Date listed | Location | City or town | Description |
|---|---|---|---|---|---|---|
| 1 | Anhinga Trail | Anhinga Trail | November 5, 1996 (#96001178) | Address Restricted; 25°22′54″N 80°36′35″W | Homestead | Part of the Archeological Resources of Everglades National Park MPS |
| 2 | Bear Lake Mounds Archeological District | | November 5, 1996 (#96001182) | Address Restricted | Flamingo | Part of the Archeological Resources of Everglades National Park MPS |
| 3 | Cane Patch | | November 5, 1996 (#96001179) | Address Restricted | Everglades City | Part of the Archeological Resources of Everglades National Park MPS |
| 4 | Monroe Lake Archeological District | | November 5, 1996 (#96001184) | Address Restricted | Homestead | Part of the Archeological Resources of Everglades National Park MPS |
| 5 | Mud Lake Canal | Mud Lake Canal | September 20, 2006 (#06000979) | Cape Sable in Everglades National Park; 25°10′26″N 80°56′17″W | Flamingo | |
| 6 | Nike Missile Site HM-69 | Nike Missile Site HM-69 | July 27, 2004 (#04000758) | Long Pine Key Road; 25°22′11″N 80°41′05″W | Homestead | |
| 7 | Rookery Mound | | November 5, 1996 (#96001183) | Address Restricted | Everglades City | Part of the Archeological Resources of Everglades National Park MPS |
| 8 | Shark River Slough Archeological District | Shark River Slough Archeological District | November 5, 1996 (#96001181) | Address Restricted | Homestead | Part of the Archeological Resources of Everglades National Park MPS |
| 9 | Ted Smallwood Store | Ted Smallwood Store | July 24, 1974 (#74000612) | State Road 29; 25°48′34″N 81°21′45″W | Chokoloskee | |
| 10 | Ten Thousand Islands Archeological District | Ten Thousand Islands Archeological District | November 5, 1996 (#96001180) | Address Restricted | Everglades City | Part of the Archeological Resources of Everglades National Park MPS |
| 11 | Turner River Site | Turner River Site | December 14, 1978 (#78000263) | Address Restricted | Ochopee | |

== See also ==
- National Register of Historic Places listings in Collier County, Florida
- National Register of Historic Places listings in Miami-Dade County, Florida
- National Register of Historic Places listings in Monroe County, Florida
- List of National Historic Landmarks in Florida
- National Register of Historic Places listings in Florida
- Archeological Resources of Everglades National Park MPS
