= Archeological Resources of Everglades National Park MPS =

- U.S. National Register of Historic Places
- Location: Everglades National Park
- MPS: "Archeological Resources of Everglades National Park - Multiple Property Documentation Form". National Park Service.
- NRHP reference No.: 64500094
- Added to NRHP: November 5, 1996

The following sites were added to the National Register of Historic Places as part of the Archeological Resources of Everglades National Park Multiple Property Submission (or MPS).

| Resource Name | Also known as | Address | City | County | Added |
|---|---|---|---|---|---|
| Anhinga Trail | | Address Restricted | Homestead | Dade County | November 5, 1996 |
| Bear Lake Mounds Archeological District | | Address Restricted | Flamingo | Monroe County | November 5, 1996 |
| Cane Patch | | Address Restricted | Everglades City | Monroe County | November 5, 1996 |
| Monroe Lake Archeological District | | Address Restricted | Homestead | Dade County | November 5, 1996 |
| Rookery Mound | | Address Restricted | Everglades City | Monroe County | November 5, 1996 |
| Shark River Slough Archeological District | | Address Restricted | Homestead | Dade County | November 5, 1996 |
| Ten Thousand Islands Archeological District | | Address Restricted | Everglades City | Monroe County | November 5, 1996 |
