= Mud Lake Canal =

- U.S. National Register of Historic Places
- U.S. National Historic Landmark
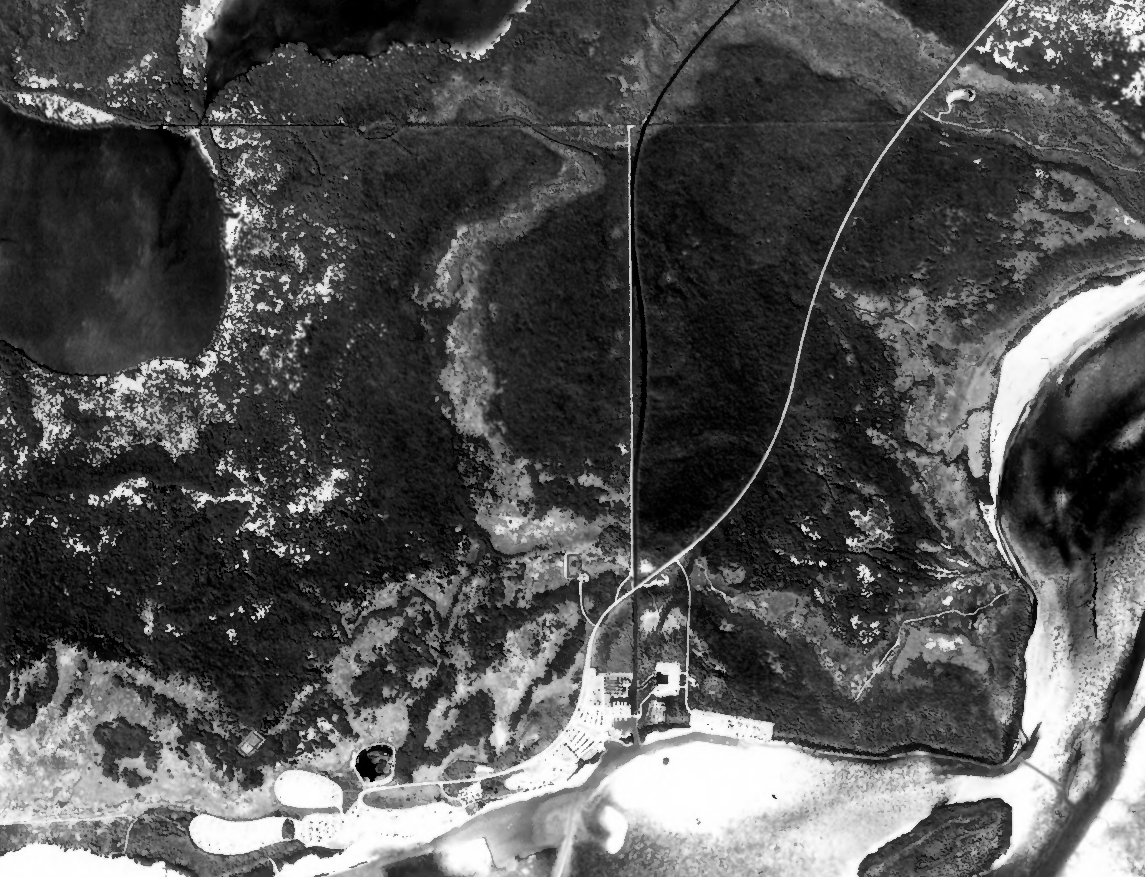
- Aerial photo showing the canal route, 1984

- Location within Florida Location within the United States
- Location: Monroe County, Florida United States
- Nearest city: Flamingo
- Coordinates: 25°10′26″N 80°56′17″W
- Area: 46.7 acres (18.9 ha)
- Built: c. 1200-1400 CE
- NRHP reference No.: 06000979

Significant dates
- Added to NRHP: September 20, 2006
- Designated NHL: September 20, 2006

The Mud Lake Canal is a prehistoric long-distance canoe canal near Flamingo, Florida, U.S. It is located at Cape Sable, in the Everglades National Park. At 3.9 miles (6.3 km), it is the longest of Florida's known prehistoric canals, believed to form a part of a sheltered travel route between the Florida Keys and the Ten Thousand Islands. On September 20, 2006, it was designated a National Historic Landmark and added to the U.S. National Register of Historic Places.

== Description ==
Mud Lake Canal is about 3.9 miles (6.3 km) in length, and varies in width between roughly 10 and 30 feet (3.0 and 9.1 m). Its dug depth is about 2 feet (0.61 m), although there are variations due to topography. Portions of the canal are significantly overgrown, but it is typically with plant life that differs from the surrounding area. Its route is crossed five times by the 20th-century Homestead Canal, and by both old and modern alignments of the Ingraham Highway. The canal's northwestern end is at the southwestern outlet of Mud Lake, north-northwest of Flamingo. It runs generally southeasterly, with long straight sections interrupted by bends, mainly on account of the local topography. A major bend sends the canal around the Bear Lake Mounds, another major prehistoric site in the area. It appears to end in a network of streams on the shore of Snake Bight, east of Flamingo. In some places along the canal route are small shell middens.

Early white settlers first brought existence of the canal to the attention of Smithsonian archaeologist Aleš Hrdlička in 1918. In 1921, a botanist discovered and described it, and an engineer working on construction of the Homestead Canal also described it the following year. It has been a subject of recurring archaeological interest since then, most significantly since the area became part of Everglades National Park.

== See also ==
- List of National Historic Landmarks in Florida
- National Register of Historic Places listings in Monroe County, Florida
