= National Register of Historic Places listings in Okeechobee County, Florida =

Location of Okeechobee County in Florida

This is a list of the National Register of Historic Places listings in Okeechobee County, Florida.

This is intended to be a complete list of the properties on the National Register of Historic Places in Okeechobee County, Florida, United States. The locations of National Register properties for which the latitude and longitude coordinates are included below, may be seen in a map.

There are 3 properties listed on the National Register in the county, including 1 National Historic Landmark.

This National Park Service list is complete through NPS recent listings posted March 21, 2025.

Contents: Counties in Florida (non-linked contain no National Register listings)
Alachua - Baker - Bay - Bradford - Brevard - Broward - Calhoun - Charlotte - Citrus - Clay - Collier - Columbia - DeSoto - Dixie - Duval - Escambia - Flagler - Franklin - Gadsden - Gilchrist - Glades - Gulf - Hamilton - Hardee - Hendry - Hernando - Highlands - Hillsborough (Tampa) - Holmes - Indian River - Jackson - Jefferson - Lafayette - Lake - Lee - Leon - Levy - Liberty - Madison - Manatee - Marion - Martin - Miami-Dade (Miami) - Monroe - Nassau - Okaloosa - Okeechobee - Orange - Osceola - Palm Beach - Pasco - Pinellas - Polk - Putnam - St. Johns - St. Lucie - Santa Rosa - Sarasota - Seminole - Sumter - Suwannee - Taylor - Union - Volusia - Wakulla - Walton - Washington

== Current listings ==
| | Name on the Register | Image | Date listed | Location | City or town | Description |
|---|---|---|---|---|---|---|
| 1 | First Methodist Episcopal Church, South | First Methodist Episcopal Church, South | August 10, 2015 (#15000509) | 200 N.W. 2nd St. 27°14′41″N 80°49′52″W | Okeechobee | NRHP# 15000509 |
| 2 | Freedman-Raulerson House | Freedman-Raulerson House | April 11, 1985 (#85000764) | 600 South Parrott Avenue; 27°14′15″N 80°49′50″W | Okeechobee | NRHP# 85000764 |
| 3 | Okeechobee Battlefield | Okeechobee Battlefield | October 15, 1966 (#66000269) | 4 miles southeast of Okeechobee on U.S. Route 441; 27°12′04″N 80°46′09″W | Okeechobee | NRHP# 66000269 |

== See also ==
- List of National Historic Landmarks in Florida
- National Register of Historic Places listings in Florida
