= Florida State Road 906 =

Former state highway in Florida

State Road 906
- SW 344th Street; Palm Drive

Route information
- Maintained by FDOT
- Existed: 1945–1980s

Major junctions
- West end: SR 997 in Florida City
- US 1 in Florida City
- East end: Biscayne National Park near Homestead

Location
- Country: United States
- State: Florida

Highway system
- Florida State Highway System; Interstate; US; State; Former; Pre‑1945; Toll; Scenic
← SR 905	→ SR 907

State Road 906 was a state highway that existed from the 1945 renumbering until the 1980s. It began at the eastern end of the intersection between former SR 997 and SR 9336 and ended at Biscayne National Park. The westernmost two blocks of SR 906 are now the easternmost two blocks of SR 9336.

== Route description ==
State Road 906 begun at the intersection of former SR 997 and SR 9336 as West Palm Drive. After heading for two blocks east, it would intersect with US 1 just south of the Turnpike's southern terminus, heading east, becoming East Palm Drive. An overhead sign on US 1 used to display directions to both Biscayne National Park and Everglades National Park, which is to the west via what is now SR 9336. On East Palm Drive, it would pass by Prime Outlets shopping mall, the Homestead Sports Complex, and the Homestead-Miami Speedway. The road continues east through Homestead, ending at the Biscayne National Park visitors center.

== History ==
The designation of SR 906 was established in 1945 and lasted until the mid-1980s, when the westernmost two blocks of SR 906 were merged with the east–west segment of the former SR 27 to form SR 9336, which was in turn shortened to its current configuration a decade later. The road still exists under local maintenance.

== Major junctions ==
The entire route was in Dade County.

Location	mi	km	Destinations	Notes
Florida City	0.0	0.0	Krome Avenue	Former SR 997
Florida City	0.1	0.16	US 1	
			Biscayne National Park	Eastern terminus
1.000 mi = 1.609 km; 1.000 km = 0.621 mi
