= Everglades Wilderness Waterway =

Recreational waterway in Florida

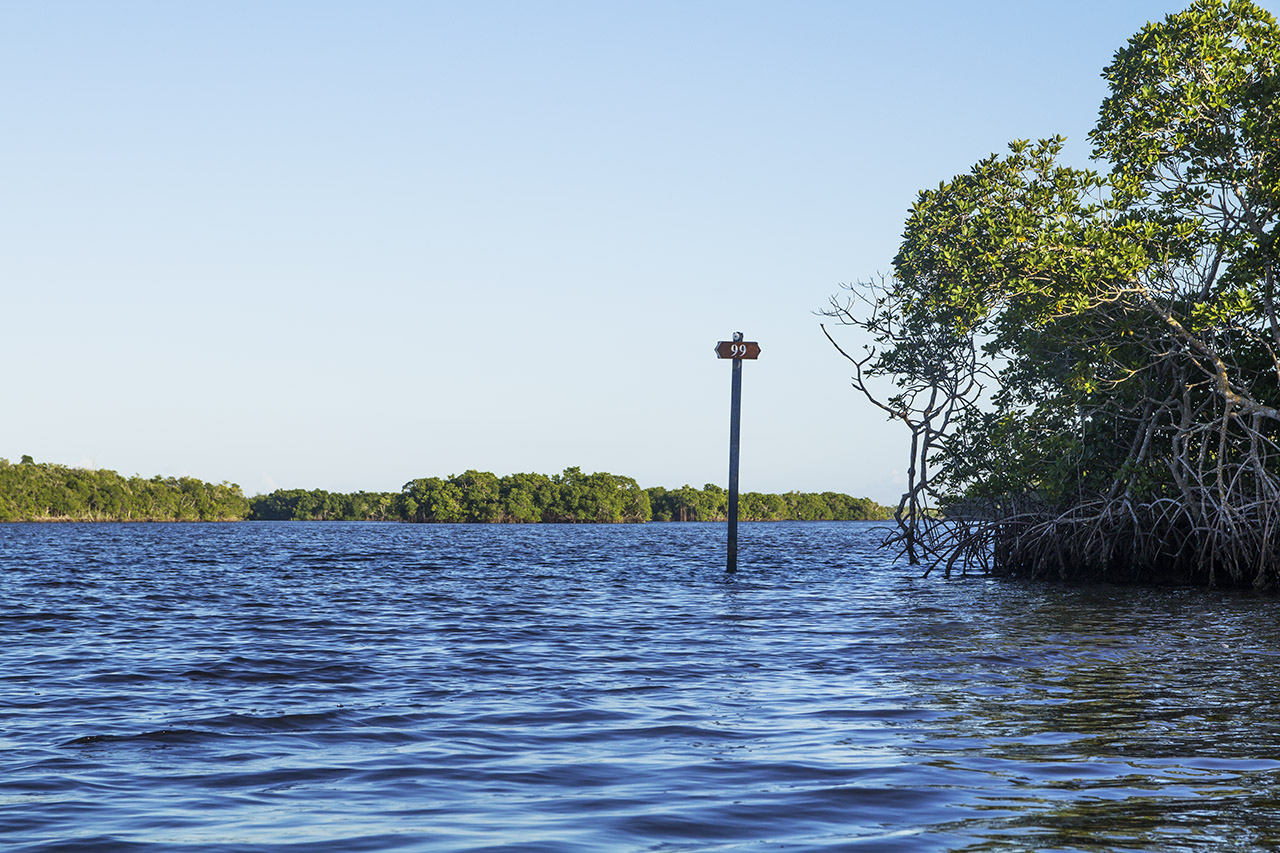
- Wilderness Waterway, Mile Marker 99

- Location within Florida Location within the United States
- Location: Florida, United States
- Coordinates: 25.746366°N 81.228167°W
- Elevation: 0 ft (0 m)

The Everglades Wilderness Waterway is a 99-mile navigable recreational waterway route within Everglades National Park, also known as Marjory Stoneman Douglas Wilderness. It includes many interconnecting creeks, rivers, lakes and inner bays that are navigable by shallow draft powerboat, kayak or canoe. The official Wilderness Waterway route is 99 miles long, but a traveler can use various additional route options to greatly extend or slightly shorten the trip.

The 99-mile Wilderness Waterway connects Flamingo and Everglades City. Most paddlers allow at least eight days to complete the trip. This route is recommended for experienced paddlers only. There are many areas of very shallow water that may be encountered along the Wilderness Waterway. Powerboats over 18' long may have to detour around Alligator Creek and Plate Creek. The “Nightmare” pass is passable only to paddlers at high tide. To prevent prop dredging, which results in increased turbidity and the destruction of submerged natural features, boats with drafts of two feet or more, including the propeller, should not use the waterway.

== Navigation charts ==
The NOAA charts that cover the wilderness waterway are 11430, 11432 and 11433.

== Camping along the Wilderness Waterway ==
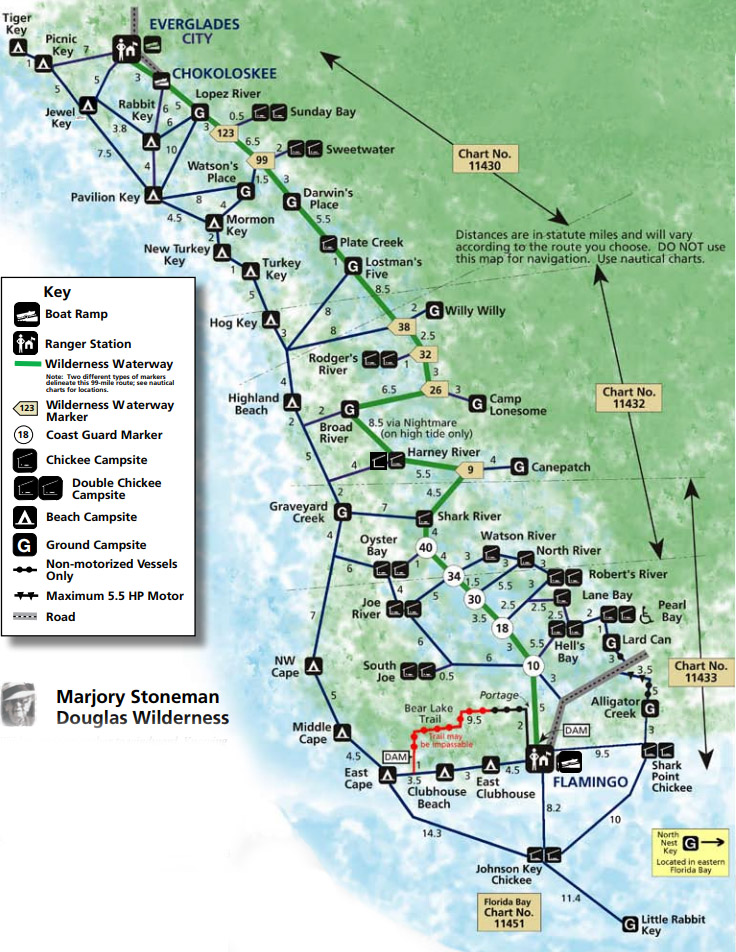
Map of Everglades Wilderness Waterway and camping sites

There are around 40 camping designated sites along the waterway which include beach, ground and chickee campsites.

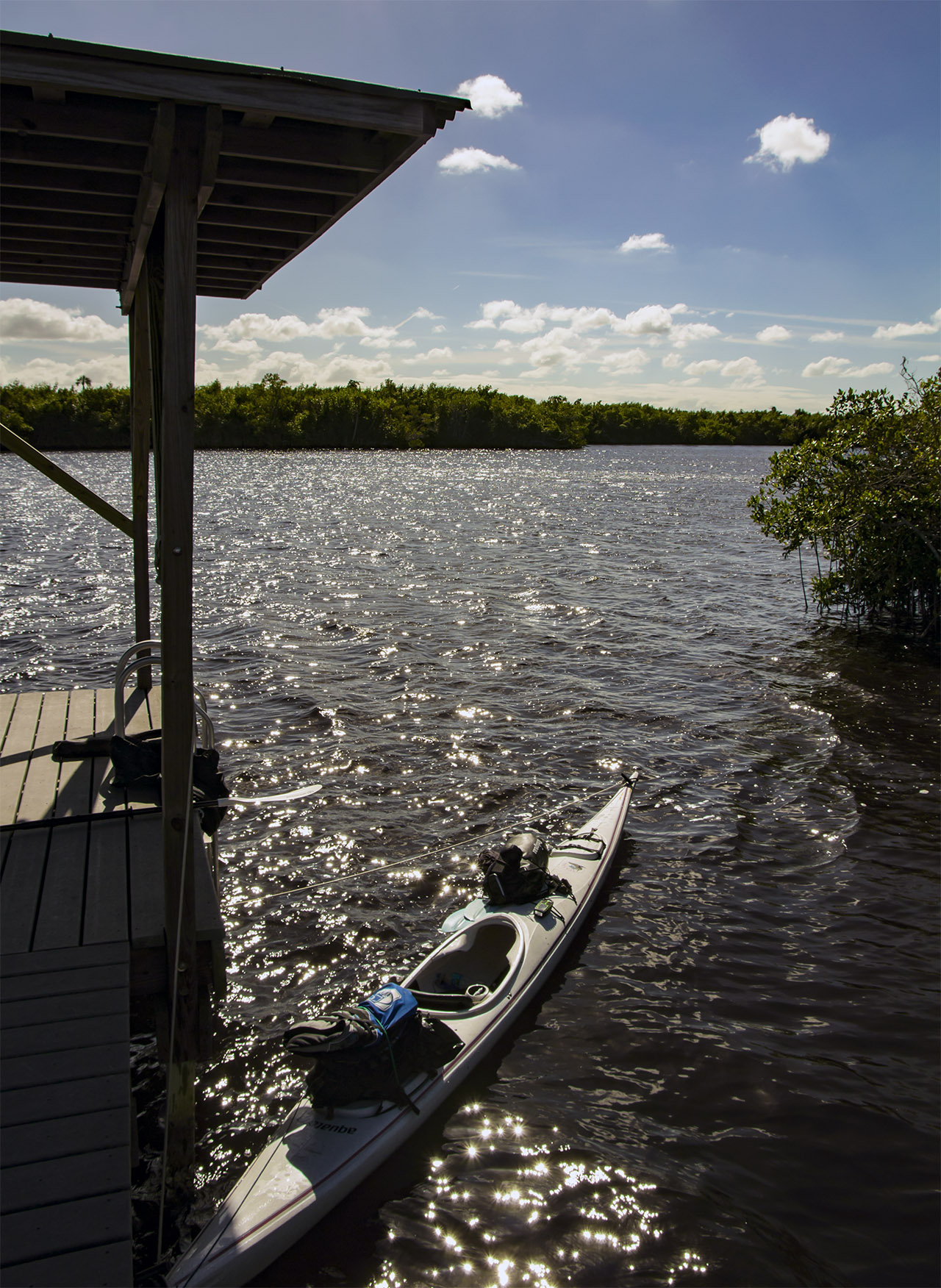
Plate Creek Chickee 12.25.2016

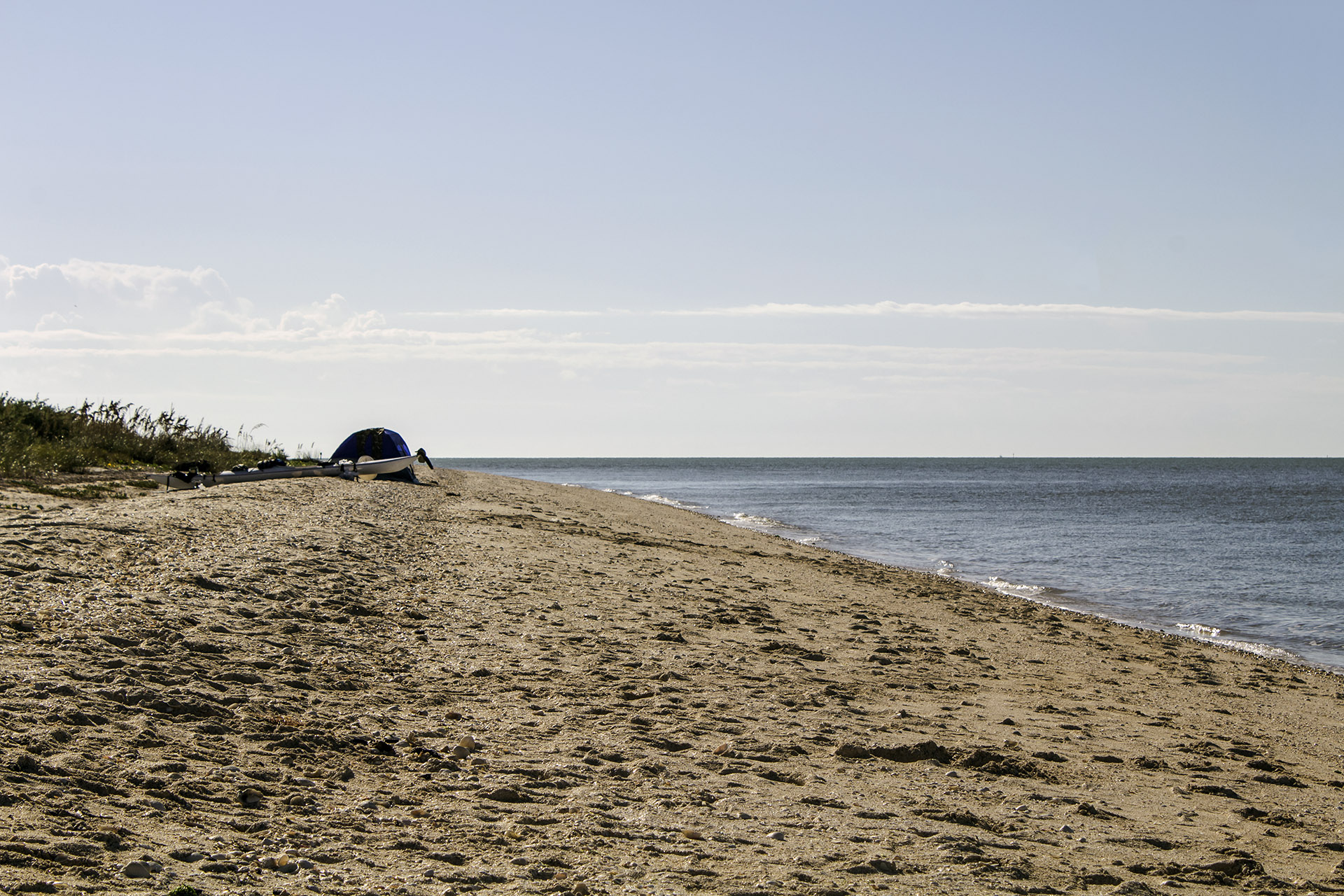
East Cape Sable Beach camping

- Beach sites are located along Florida Bay and Gulf of Mexico. During ideal conditions, insects may be scarce, but mosquitoes and no-see-ums (tiny biting insects) may be present, especially at sunrise and sunset. Gulf waters at beach sites can become rough; seas can exceed 3 feet. Low tides often expose large mud flats, which may make beach access difficult. Campfires are only allowed below high-tide line.
- Chickees are located along rivers and bays where dry land is inaccessible. They are elevated 10' x 12' wooden platforms with roofs. A walkway leads to a self-contained toilet. You'll need a free–standing tent, since stakes or nails are not allowed. No campfires are allowed on chickees. Some paddlers have difficulty accessing chickees from their boats. A loop of heavy rope may be helpful.
- Ground sites are mounds of earth and shells a few feet higher than the surrounding mangroves, located along interior bays and rivers. They tend to have more insects than chickees or beach sites. No campfires are allowed on ground sites but gas grills or stoves are permitted. Wood, charcoal, or coal fueled grills or stoves are not permitted.

== Outside Route ==
The additional 75-mile Outside Route extends along Florida Bay and the Gulf of Mexico from Flamingo back to Everglades City. This route can be used to avoid shuttle service and usually adds 5 more days of paddle. Travelers will have to portage their paddle boats over a small freshwater/saltwater dam that separates the 99-mile "inside route" from the open water of Florida Bay.

The campsites along the Outside Route are:

- East Clubhouse
- Clubhouse Beach
- East Cape, Middle Cape, and Northwest Cape Sable
- Graveyard Creek
- Highland Beach
- Hog Key, Turkey Key, New Turkey Key, Mormon Key, Pavilion Key and Rabbit Key - all part of the Ten Thousand Islands Archipelago.

== Permits ==
Campers can obtain permits through www.recreation.gov. Campers must pick up their permits in person. Permits are currently 23.00 dollars and reservations can be made up to 90 days out.

== Notable features and landmarks ==
- Nauti Buoy Chickee - the last remaining private property within the Everglades National Park.
- Shell mounds built by Calusa people. Most of the ground campsites are situated on the shell mounds of various sizes and state of preservation.
- Watson's Place - a shell mound site occupied by a sugar cane farmer and criminal Ed Watson in the early 20th century.
- Darwin's Place - a shell mound occupied by Arthur Darwin, a hermit of the Everglades from 1940s to 1980. Anyone who attempted to paddle the waterway would have to pass Darwin's place on the way so he became famous among the paddling community.

== Publications ==
- Paddling the Everglades Wilderness Waterway by Holly Genzen and Anne McCrary Sullivan
- A Guide To The Wilderness Waterway Of The Everglades National Park by William G Truesdell
- Paddler's Guide to Everglades National Park by Johnny Molloy

== Gallery ==
Nauti Buoy Chickee

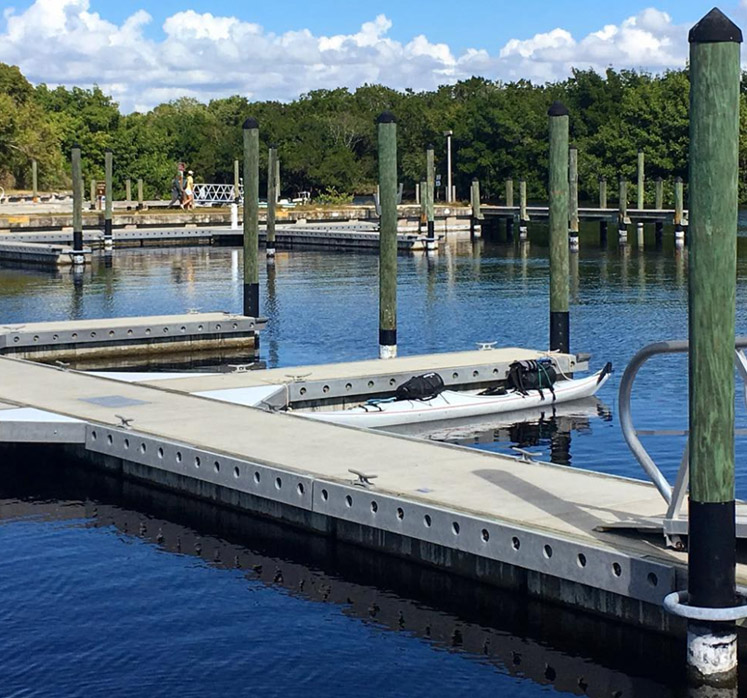
Terminus of the Waterway on the freshwater side of Flamingo Marina

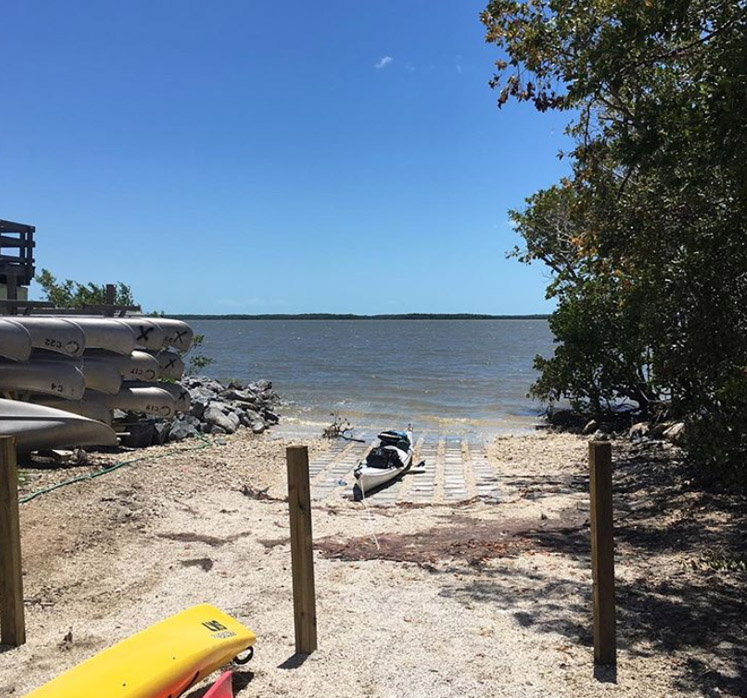
Terminus of the Waterway at the Gulf Coast Visitor Center

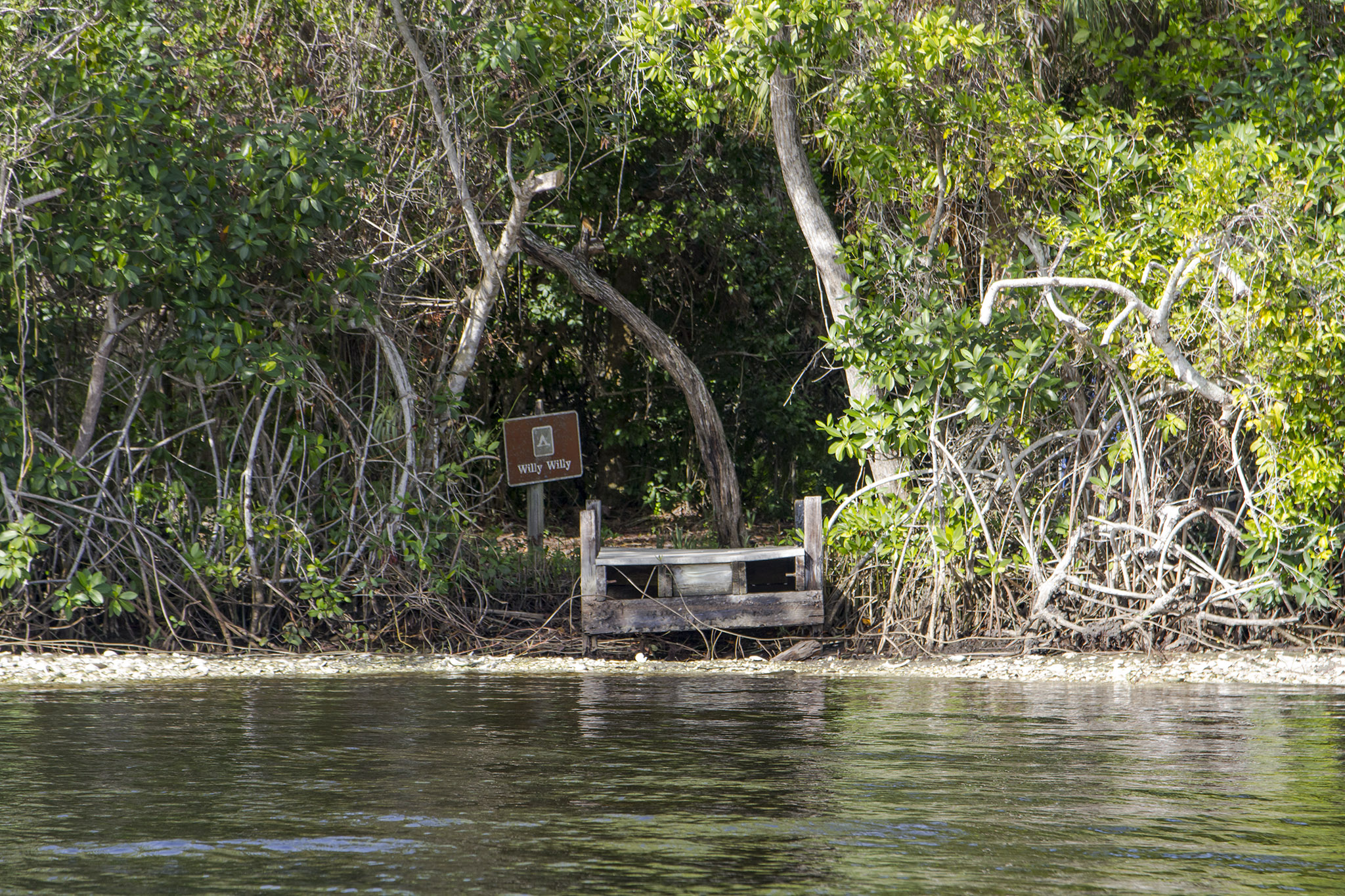
Willy Willy - a campsite on a shell mound
