= List of National Natural Landmarks in Florida =

Florida National Natural Landmarks (clickable map)

The National Natural Landmarks (NNLs) in Florida include 18 of the almost 600 such landmarks in the United States. They cover areas of geological, biological and historical importance, and include springs, swamps, marshes and seashore. Several of the sites provide habitat for rare or endangered plant and animal species. The landmarks are located in 14 of the state's 67 counties. Four counties each contain all or part of two or more NNLs, while two landmarks is split between two counties. The first designation, Corkscrew Swamp Sanctuary, was made in 1964, while the most recent designation, Archbold Biological Station, was made in 1987. Natural Landmarks in Florida range from 593 to 14,000 acres (240.0 to 5,665.6 ha; 0.9 to 21.9 sq mi) in size. Owners include private individuals and several state and federal agencies.

The National Natural Landmarks Program is administered by the National Park Service, a branch of the Department of the Interior. The National Park Service determines which properties meet NNL criteria and, after notifying the owners, makes nomination recommendations. The Secretary of the Interior reviews nominations and, based on a set of predetermined criteria, makes a decision on NNL designation or a determination of eligibility for designation. Both public and privately owned properties can be designated as NNLs. Owners may object to the nomination of the property as a NNL. This designation provides indirect, partial protection of the historic integrity of the properties via tax incentives, grants, monitoring of threats, and other means.

== National Natural Landmarks ==
Name	Image	Date	Location	County	Ownership	Description
Archbold Biological Station		May 1987	27°10′50″N 81°21′0″W	Highlands	Private	Protects the largest undisturbed tract of the Lake Wales Ridge.
Big Cypress Bend		October 1966	25°51′32″N 81°2′2″W	Collier	State	A part of Fakahatchee Strand Preserve State Park, it includes 215 acres (87 ha) of old-growth bald cypress.
Corkscrew Swamp Sanctuary		March 1964	26°25′4.41″N 81°32′18.33″W	Collier	State, private	Contains the nation's largest remaining virgin strand of bald cypress trees.
Devil's Millhopper		December 1974	29°42′25″N 82°23′42″W	Alachua	State	A karst dry sinkhole located within the eponymous state park.
Emeralda Marsh		December 1974	28°58′1.46″N 81°48′13.88″W	Lake, Marion	State, private	This inland freshwater sawgrass marsh is also a popular birding area.
Florida Caverns Natural Area		December 1976	30°48′50″N 85°13′59″W	Jackson	State	Eponymous state park protects Florida's only publicly accessible cave. Winter home of the endangered Indiana bat.
Ichetucknee Springs		October 1971	29°58′2.47″N 82°46′33.82″W	Columbia, Suwannee	State	Artesian spring, the state's third largest, included in eponymous state park.
Lignumvitae Key		October 1968	24°54′7.18″N 80°41′57.56″W	Monroe	State	Located in an eponymous state park, contains the best preserved tropical hammock forest in the country.
Manatee Springs		December 1971	29°29′25.49″N 82°58′37.47″W	Levy	State	An eponymous state park surrounds the state's sixth largest artesian spring.
Osceola Research Natural Area		December 1974	30°17′26″N 82°19′18″W	Baker	Federal	Isolated mixed hardwood forest featuring virgin bald cypress strands. A portion of Osceola National Forest.
Paynes Prairie		December 1974	29°34′1″N 82°22′52″W	Alachua	State, private	Freshwater marsh in one of the state's largest sinks. Majority of the site included in Paynes Prairie Preserve State Park.
Rainbow Springs		October 1971	29°6′9.57″N 82°26′13.38″W	Marion	State	Florida's second largest artesian spring. Part of an eponymous state park.
Reed Wilderness Seashore Sanctuary		November 1967	27°2′25.64″N 80°6′49.47″W	Martin	Federal	A part of Hobe Sound National Wildlife Refuge, protects the largest undisturbed stretch of Florida's Atlantic coast. A nesting site of the loggerhead turtle.
San Felasco Hammock		December 1974	29°43′44″N 82°26′31″W	Alachua	State, private	Mainly located in San Felasco Hammock Preserve State Park, contains a diverse forest environment.
Silver Springs		October 1971	29°12′59″N 82°3′28″W	Marion	Private	Eponymous state park surrounds the state's largest artesian spring.
Torreya State Park		December 1976	30°34′8″N 84°56′53″W	Liberty	State	Steep ravines cut through this eponymous state park. Home of endangered plants such as the Florida yew.
Waccasassa Bay Preserve State Park		December 1976	29°10′44.37″N 82°55′50.31″W	Levy	State	Brackish mangrove protected in an eponymous state park.
Wakulla Springs		October 1966	30°13′58″N 84°17′32″W	Wakulla	State	Located in Edward Ball Wakulla Springs State Park, includes the state's deepest artesian spring.

== See also ==
- National Register of Historic Places listings in Florida
- List of National Historic Landmarks in Florida
- List of Florida state parks
