= Florida State Road 998 =

Highway in Florida

State Road 998

Route information
- Maintained by FDOT
- Length: 0.774 mi (1,246 m)
- Existed: 2019–present

Major junctions
- West end: SR 997 in Homestead
- East end: US 1 in Homestead

Location
- Country: United States
- State: Florida
- Counties: Miami-Dade

Highway system
- Florida State Highway System; Interstate; US; State; Former; Pre‑1945; Toll; Scenic
← SR 997	→ SR 1010

State Road 998 (SR 998) is an east–west road in Homestead, Florida, connecting the southern terminus of SR 997 with U.S. Route 1 (US 1). The road, known locally as a portion of Campbell Drive, North 8th Street and Southwest 312th Street, runs just over 3/4 mile (1.2 km) and serves as a truck bypass around downtown Homestead. It is the highest numbered three-digit state highway in Florida.

== Route description ==
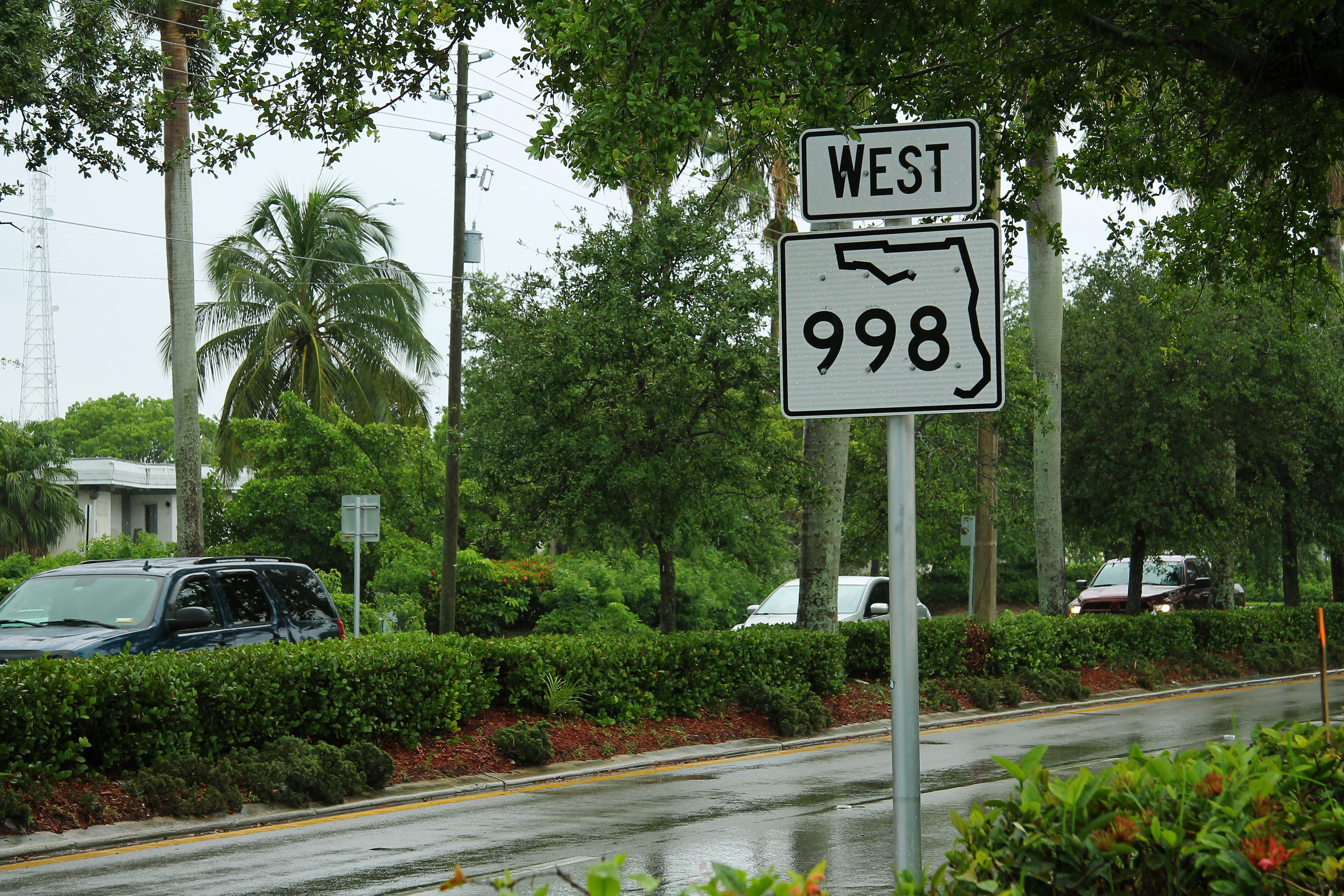
Signage for SR 998 near US 1

SR 998 starts at the intersection of Campbell Drive and Krome Avenue (SR 997 north/CR 997 south) and heads east, crossing the South Miami-Dade Busway, and ending at South Dixie Highway (US 1).

== History ==
SR 998 was created in 2019 as part of a road swap between the Florida Department of Transportation (FDOT) and the county of Miami-Dade as part of FDOT's Krome Avenue widening project. Since the portion of former SR 997 on Krome Avenue passes through a portion of downtown Homestead that could not accommodate a road widening, the state relinquished the highway to the county in exchange for Campbell Drive entering the state highway system.

== Major intersections ==
The entire route is in Homestead, Miami-Dade County.

mi	km	Destinations	Notes
0.000	0.000	SR 997 north (Krome Avenue / Southwest 177th Avenue)	Western terminus of SR 998; southern terminus of SR 997; Krome Avenue south is former SR 997 south.
0.503	0.810	South Miami-Dade Busway	
0.538	0.866	Flagler Avenue	Former US 1 Bus. / SR 5A
0.774	1.246	US 1 (South Dixie Highway / SR 5)	Eastern terminus
1.000 mi = 1.609 km; 1.000 km = 0.621 mi
