= Florida State Road 997 =

State highway in Miami-Dade County, Florida, United States

State Road 997
- West 177th Avenue / Krome Avenue
- SR 997 highlighted in red

Route information
- Maintained by FDOT
- Length: 36.705 mi (59.071 km)
- Existed: 1983–present

Major junctions
- South end: SR 998 in Homestead
- SR 94 in The Hammocks; US 41 west of Sweetwater
- North end: US 27 northwest of Hialeah

Location
- Country: United States
- State: Florida
- Counties: Miami-Dade

Highway system
- Florida State Highway System; Interstate; US; State; Former; Pre‑1945; Toll; Scenic
← SR 996	→ SR 998

State Road 997 (SR 997), also known as Krome Avenue and West 177th Avenue is a 36.7-mile-long (59.1 km) north–south state highway in western Miami-Dade County, Florida. It runs from State Road 998 in Homestead north across U.S. Route 41 to U.S. Route 27 near Countyline Dragway (formerly Opa-locka West Airport), just south of the Broward County line. Its main use is as a bypass around the western side of Miami, linking the routes that run southwest, west and northwest from that city. The road passes through newer suburbs in the southern third of its length, while the northern two thirds of the highway traverse the eastern edge of the Everglades.

== Route description ==
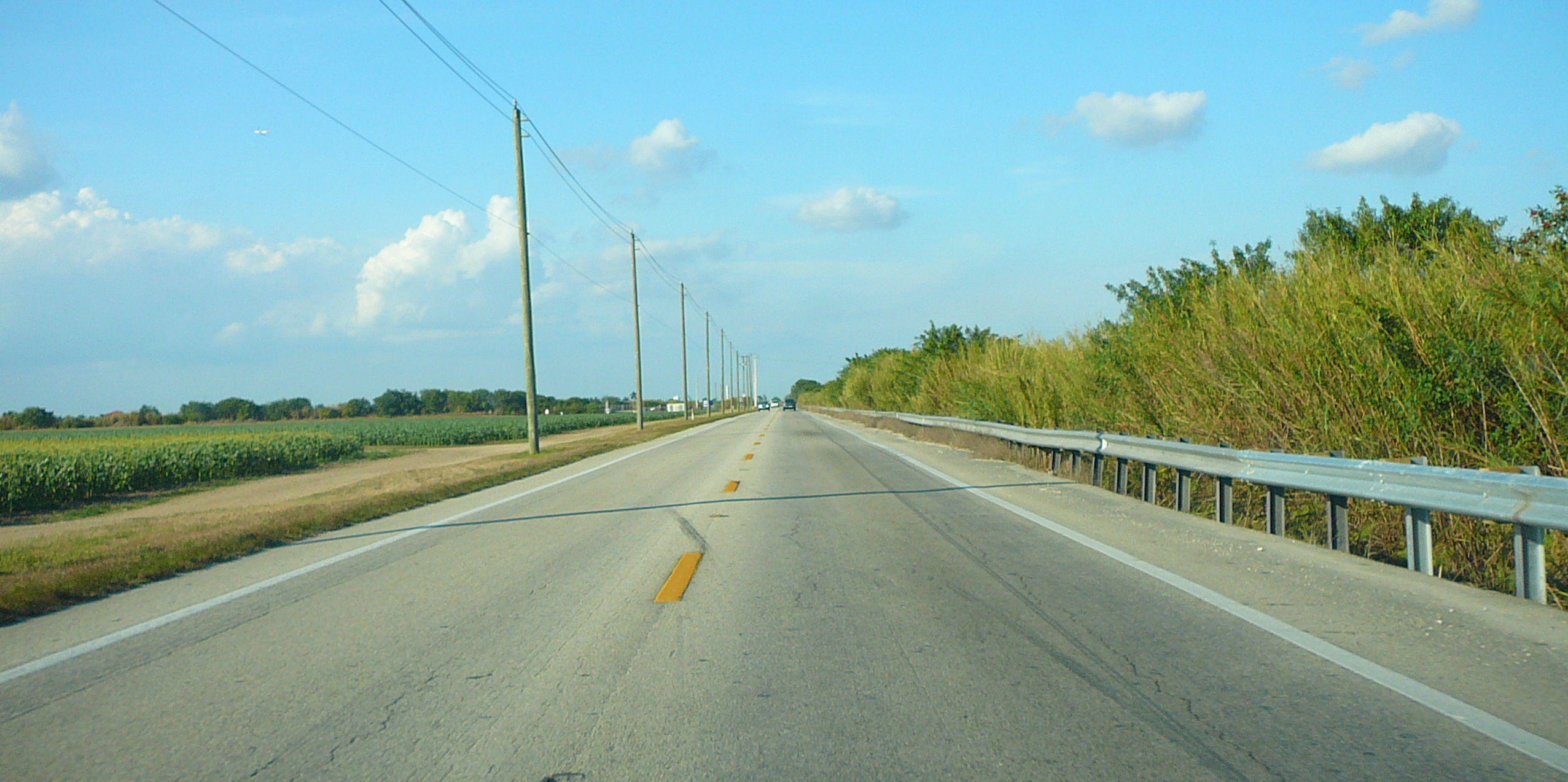
Krome Avenue northbound about two miles south of Kendall Drive; the undeveloped western boundary of The Hammocks is on the right and a large cornfield is on the left (January, 2008)

State Road 997 begins in Homestead at the western terminus of SR 998 on Campbell Drive. The road heads north exiting Homestead and enters unincorporated Miami-Dade county, immediately entering farmland north of Southwest 296th Street, and becoming increasingly rural the further north it journeys.

SR 997 passes through the rural community of Redland, crossing CSX tracks north of Southwest 232nd Street. 6.1 miles (9.8 km) after leaving Homestead, SR 997 forms the western terminus of SR 994 northwest of the remains of Aladdin City. After a few more miles and crossing the Black Creek Canal, SR 997 chicanes to the right, crossing over the Conrad Yelvington branch railroad where it forms the western boundary of the suburban The Hammocks up to its junction with SR 94, the latter's western terminus. Past here, the road enters woodland and is relatively uninterrupted for the next 5 miles (8.0 km), save for the Conrad Yelvington facility, reaching the Tamiami Trail (US 41) at its northern end. After passing the Miccosukee Indian casino and resort, SR 997 has an uninterrupted run north along the boundary of the Everglades, turning northeast after 9 miles (14 km). After crossing the Miami Canal 4.4 miles (7.1 km) later, SR 997 terminates after 0.8 miles (1.3 km) at US 27.

== History ==
State Road 205 was defined in 1931 to run from Flamingo (now inside Everglades National Park) northeast to State Road 4A (now U.S. Route 1) in Florida City along the Ingraham Highway. There it would run concurrent with US 1 into Homestead (US 1 ran through downtown Florida City and Homestead, instead of the bypass it uses now), splitting onto the existing Krome Avenue to end at State Road 27 (U.S. Route 94, the Tamiami Trail, now U.S. Route 41).

In the 1945 renumbering, the State Road 27 number was assigned to all of the former State Road 205, as well as an extension north to State Road 25 (now U.S. Route 27). The large Everglades National Park was formed in 1947, taking over most of SR 27 southwest from Florida City. Paving of this road, mostly along the old Ingraham Highway, was completed in 1956. The extension north to SR 25 opened in the early 1950s.

In the mid-1960s, State Road 5 (U.S. Route 1) was rerouted onto a bypass of Homestead and Florida City. This removed the concurrency of SR 997 and SR 5/US 1, but the old alignment became State Road 5A and U.S. Route 1 Business until 1968.

The SR 27 designation for Krome Avenue confused many motorists, as the SR 27 designation belonged to the nearby Tamiami Trail (U.S. Route 41) prior to the 1945 renumbering. Tamiami Trail was still labeled as SR 27 on maps for several years following 1945. In later decades, motorists confused Krome Avenue for Okeechobee Road, which carried the similarly numbered U.S. Route 27 since 1949.

In 1983, the Florida Department of Transportation renumbered the road as a part of a statewide renumbering and to avoid state road number confusion. The part north of Florida City became State Road 997, which was extended south past the turnoff for the Everglades to merge with U.S. Route 1. The part southwest from Florida City became State Road 9336, and at some point it was extended east two blocks past SR 997 to US 1.

Since the late 1960s, plans to incorporate the southern portion of Krome Avenue into Miami-Dade County's system of expressways have been repeatedly announced and killed. The original plans for the Homestead Extension of Florida's Turnpike incorporated a continuation from the southwest end of the current State Road 874 southwest to Krome Avenue, then southward to Homestead. When the proposal was defeated in 1971, the Turnpike Extension was rerouted to the present-day configuration.

Krome Avenue is named for William J. Krome, a railroad engineer for the Florida East Coast Railway who was known for leading an expedition to survey Cape Sable for a route for the Overseas Railroad to Key West. Krome ended up mapping much of Everglades for the first time, and is also known for his contributions to agriculture in the area. He was a member of the Florida State Horticultural Society and operated orchards in Redland.

=== Widening and recent history ===
In December 2014, FDOT began work to turn Campbell Drive between SR 997 and US 1 into a truck by-pass, eliminating the need for truck traffic to pass through downtown Florida City and Homestead. The widening of Campbell resulted in its addition to the state highway system as State Road 998. In exchange, FDOT shortened SR 997 on Krome Avenue by relinquishing the segment south of Campbell to Miami-Dade County, which now exists as unsigned County Road 997.

With increasing traffic and increasing numbers of accidents on Krome Avenue, discussions of widening the highway had begun by the 1980s. A project began in 2015 to widen the highway to 4 lanes with a median for its entire length, starting at Okeechobee Road in 2015 and with the final southern sections to start in 2019. Disapproval has arisen from Redland and Homestead, as the people living in those areas express their fear of increasing traffic changing the rural character of their neighborhoods. Farmers also worried that the widening would hinder access to the fresh produce that they sell. There were also environmental objections to the project, including light pollution from the new streetlights being installed for the entire length of the highway. This changed the nature of the road from a rural bypass route to a third outer loop or "beltway" of Miami after the Palmetto Expressway and the HEFT amid a burgeoning population and increasing traffic congestion, possibly putting pressure on the county Urban Development Boundary, which protects against westward encroachment into the Everglades. The first section to begin construction was the northern segment from Tamiami Trail to the Okeechobee Road terminus, followed by the middle segment from Tamiami down to SW 88 Street/Kendall Drive.

== Major intersections ==
The entire route is in Miami-Dade County.

Location	mi	km	Destinations	Notes
Homestead	2.813	4.527	SR 998 east (Campbell Drive / Southwest 312th Street) to Florida's Turnpike Extension – Miami-Dade College	western terminus of SR 998 southern terminus of SR 997; Krome Avenue continues south as unsigned CR 997
Redland	9.884	15.907	SR 994 east (Quail Roost Drive / Southwest 200th Street)	western terminus of SR 994
The Hammocks	17.431	28.052	SR 94 east (Kendall Drive / Southwest 88th Street) to Florida's Turnpike Extension	western terminus of SR 94
	22.430	36.098	US 41 (Southwest 8th Street / SR 90)	where the Miccosukee Casino & Resort is
	36.705	59.071	US 27 (Okeechobee Road / SR 25)	
1.000 mi = 1.609 km; 1.000 km = 0.621 mi

== See also ==
- List of state highways in Florida
- List of highways numbered 997
- Transportation in South Florida#Dolphin Expressway extension - Krome Avenue widening
