= Okeechobee Battlefield Historic State Park =

Battlefield site in Florida, United States

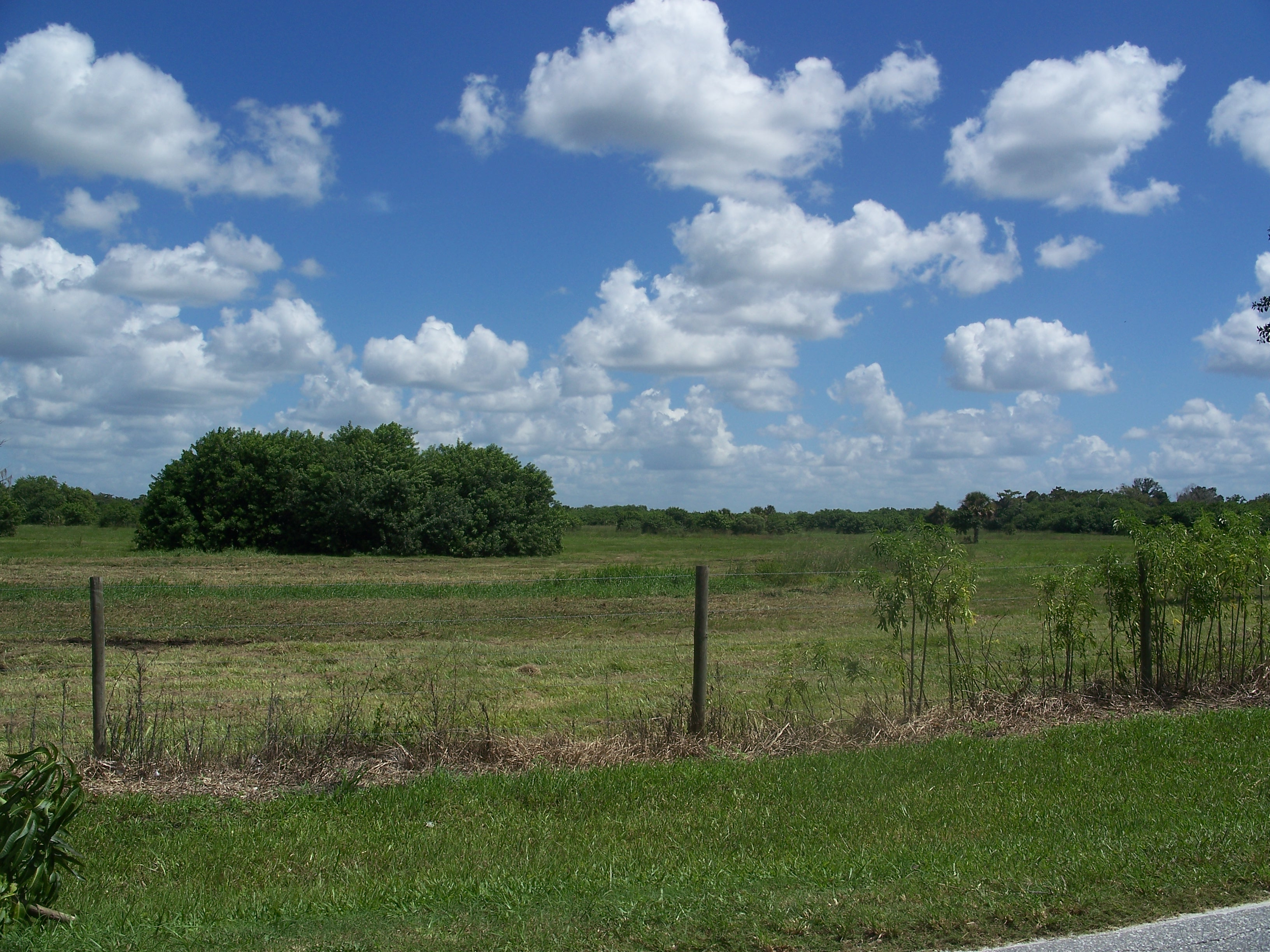
- A view of the battlefield from the road

- Location within Florida Location within the United States
- Interactive map of Okeechobee Battlefield Historic State Park
- Location: Okeechobee County, Florida
- Nearest city: Okeechobee
- Coordinates: 27.2126°N 80.7892°W
- Area: 640 acres (260 ha) (original); 440 acres (180 ha) (after 1998 adjustment)
- Okeechobee Battlefield
- U.S. National Register of Historic Places
- NRHP reference No.: 66000269

Significant dates
- Added to NRHP: July 4, 1961
- Boundary decrease: 1998

The Okeechobee Battlefield is a Florida State Park and U.S. National Historic Landmark (designated as such on July 4, 1961). It is located four miles (6.4 km) southeast of Okeechobee, on US 98/US 441, near Taylor Creek. The Battle of Lake Okeechobee, one of the major conflicts of the Second Seminole War, was fought at the site.

== Description and history ==
The Okeechobee Battlefield covers an estimated 440 acres (180 ha) of land on the east side of Taylor Creek. Much of the land is now agricultural, but portions of the battlefield have been developed, and it has been impacted by road construction. The agricultural appearance of the open portions of the battlefield also differ from the time of the battle, when much of the area was overgrown with sawgrass as much as six feet (1.8 m) in height. The principal feature of the battlefield is a low hummock, which provided the Seminoles with defensive cover in the engagement. North of this hummock, across what was originally open sawgrass, is a wooded area where Colonel Zachary Taylor made camp prior to the battle.

When the battlefield was listed as a National Historic Landmark in 1961, an area of 640 acres (260 ha) that was believed to include the "general area" of the battlefield was landmarked. In the 1980s, the National Park Service commissioned more detailed studies, and performed some archaeological work in the area, to more precisely identify the battlefield area. As a result, the landmarked area was decreased to above 440 acres (180 ha), most of which overlapped parts of the original designation. A marker was placed near the site in 1939, and a portion of the battlefield was purchased by the state of Florida in 2006.

A volunteer group sponsors annual reenactments of the Battle of Lake Okeechobee as a fundraising activity for the park.

== See also ==
- List of National Historic Landmarks in Florida
- National Register of Historic Places listings in Okeechobee County, Florida
