= List of National Historic Landmarks in Florida =

Florida National Historic Landmarks (clickable map)

The National Historic Landmarks in Florida are representations of a broad sweep of history from Pre-Columbian times, through the Second Seminole War and Civil War, and the Space Age. There are 47 National Historic Landmarks (NHLs) in Florida, which are located in twenty-two of the state's sixty-seven counties. Sixteen of the NHLs in the state are significant examples of a particular architectural style, eleven have military significance, ten are archaeological sites, three were the homes of well-known American authors, and one is associated with the development of the U.S. Space Program.

Six sites are in state parks and managed by the Florida Department of Environmental Protection.

Also included is a site determined eligible for National Historic Landmark status, and a list of historical sites in Florida managed by the U.S. National Park Service which also have national significance.

The National Historic Landmark program is administered by the National Park Service, a branch of the Department of the Interior. The National Park Service determines which properties meet NHL criteria and makes nomination recommendations after an owner notification process. The Secretary of the Interior reviews nominations and, based on a set of predetermined criteria, makes a decision on NHL designation or a determination of eligibility for designation. Both public and privately owned properties are designated as NHLs. This designation provides indirect, partial protection of the historic integrity of the properties, via tax incentives, grants, monitoring of threats, and other means. Owners may object to the nomination of the property as an NHL. When this is the case the Secretary of the Interior can only designate a site as eligible for designation.

NHLs are also included on the National Register of Historic Places (NRHP), which are historic properties that the National Park Service deems to be worthy of preservation. The primary difference between an NHL and a NRHP listing is that the NHLs are determined to have national significance, while other NRHP properties are deemed significant at the local or state level. The NHLs in Florida comprise 2.6% of the approximately 1,600 properties and districts listed on the National Register of Historic Places in Florida.

== Key ==
	National Historic Landmark
^{†}	National Historic Landmark District
^{#}	National Historic Site, National Historical Park, National Memorial, or National Monument
^{*}	Delisted Landmark

== Current NHLs ==
	Landmark name	Image	Date designated	Location	County	Description
1	Mary McLeod Bethune Home	Mary McLeod Bethune Home	December 2, 1974 (#74000655)	Daytona Beach; 29°12′39″N 81°01′56″W	Volusia	Home of Mary McLeod Bethune, educator and civil rights leader
2	Bok Tower Gardens	Bok Tower Gardens	April 19, 1993 (#72000350)	Lake Wales; 27°56′06″N 81°34′37″W	Polk	Constructed by Ladies Home Journal editor Edward W. Bok on the highest hill in the area to create "a spot of beauty second to none in the country"
3	British Fort	British Fort	May 15, 1975 (#72000318)	Sumatra; 29°56′23″N 85°00′45″W	Franklin	Built during the War of 1812 and also known as Negro Fort, it was the location of a fortification occupied by runaway slaves, as well as Native Americans living in the area. Due to a massive explosion near the end of the war, nothing remains of the fort.
4^{†}	Cape Canaveral Space Force Station	Cape Canaveral Space Force Station	April 16, 1984 (#84003872)	Cocoa; 28°29′20″N 80°34′40″W	Brevard	The East Coast space launch facility of the United States Space Force, and adjacent to the Kennedy Space Center
5	Cathedral Of St. Augustine	Cathedral Of St. Augustine	April 15, 1970 (#70000844)	St.Augustine; 29°53′29″N 81°18′45″W	St. Johns	Completed in 1797, it was severely damaged by fire in 1887, but restored over the next two years. It is part of the St. Augustine Town Plan Historic District
6	Crystal River Site	Crystal River Site	June 21, 1990 (#70000178)	Crystal River; 28°55′01″N 82°36′33″W	Citrus	A ceremonial center and burial complex, occupied during the Deptford, Weeden Island, and Safety Harbor periods
7	Dade Battlefield	Dade Battlefield	November 7, 1973 (#72000353)	Bushnell; 28°39′08″N 82°07′36″W	Sumter	Site of the Dade Massacre during the Second Seminole War, it is now a state park
8	Marjory Stoneman Douglas House	Marjory Stoneman Douglas House	February 27, 2015 (#15000312)	Miami; 27°57′37″N 82°26′32″W	Miami-Dade County	Home of noted environmentalist and activist Marjory Stoneman Douglas.
9^{†}	Dudley Farm	Dudley Farm	January 13, 2021 (#02001081)	18730 West Newberry Road; 29°39′15″N 82°32′37″W	Alachua	A fine example of a late-19th to early-20th century farm.
10	El Centro Español de Tampa	El Centro Español de Tampa	June 3, 1988 (#88001823)	Tampa; 27°57′37″N 82°26′32″W	Hillsborough	Home of the first mutual aid society in Florida, and part of the Ybor City Historic District
11	Ferdinand Magellan - U.S. Car No. 1	Ferdinand Magellan - U.S. Car No. 1	February 4, 1985 (#77000401)	Miami; 25°37′03″N 80°24′00″W	Miami-Dade	The first passenger railcar built for a President since the one made for Lincoln in 1865. It was used by FDR, Truman, Eisenhower, and briefly by Reagan.
12^{†}	Florida Southern College Historic District	Florida Southern College Historic District	March 2, 2012 (#75000568)	Lakeland; 28°01′52″N 81°56′48″W	Polk	Contains the largest single-site collection of Frank Lloyd Wright architecture.
13	Fort King Site	Fort King Site	February 24, 2004 (#04000320)	Ocala; 29°11′20″N 82°04′56″W	Marion	Site of fort prominent before and during the Second Seminole War. It was located at a nexus of military roads reaching from Tampa to Jacksonville
14	Fort Mose Site	Fort Mose Site	October 12, 1994 (#94001645)	St.Augustine; 29°55′40″N 81°19′31″W	St. Johns	First free Black settlement legally sanctioned in what would become the United States. Runaway slaves from the Southern Colonies escaped to freedom here during the early to mid 18th century, making this a precursor to the Underground Railroad.
15	Fort San Carlos De Barrancas	Fort San Carlos De Barrancas	October 9, 1960 (#66000263)	Pensacola; 30°20′52″N 87°17′51″W	Escambia	Site of a series of forts going back as far as 1698, now part of the Gulf Islands National Seashore.
16	Fort San Marcos De Apalache	Fort San Marcos De Apalache	November 13, 1966 (#66000271)	St. Marks; 30°09′18″N 84°12′40″W	Wakulla	Wooden or masonry forts were at this site during Spanish or British colonial periods, and the Second Seminole War. The Spanish fort's capture in 1818 by Jackson led the U.S. to acquire Florida in 1821.
17	Fort Walton Mound	Fort Walton Mound	July 19, 1964 (#66000268)	Fort Walton Beach; 30°24′13″N 86°36′27″W	Okaloosa	Type site of the Fort Walton Culture
18	Fort Zachary Taylor	Fort Zachary Taylor	May 31, 1973 (#71000244)	Key West; 24°32′46″N 81°48′37″W	Monroe	Controlled by the Union during the Civil War, later used heavily during the Spanish–American War, it is now a state park
19	Freedom Tower	Freedom Tower	October 6, 2008 (#79000665)	Miami; 25°46′48″N 80°11′23″W	Miami-Dade	The original headquarters and printing facility of the Miami News & Metropolis newspaper; later made a memorial to Cuban immigration to the U.S.
20	González-Alvarez House	González-Alvarez House	April 15, 1970 (#70000845)	St.Augustine; 29°53′17″N 81°18′36″W	St. Johns	The oldest house in St. Augustine, built in the early 18th century, and part of the St. Augustine Town Plan Historic District
21	Governor Stone (schooner)	Governor Stone (schooner)	December 4, 1992 (#91002063)	Panama City; 30°10′03″N 85°42′09″W	Bay	Built in 1877, it is the oldest surviving Gulf-built two-masted coasting schooner
22	Ernest Hemingway House	Ernest Hemingway House	November 24, 1968 (#68000023)	Key West; 24°33′04″N 81°48′03″W	Monroe	A home of author Ernest Hemingway
23	Hotel Ponce de Leon	Hotel Ponce de Leon	February 17, 2006 (#75002067)	St.Augustine; 29°53′32″N 81°18′51″W	St. Johns	Built in 1887-88 by Carrère and Hastings for real estate and railroad tycoon Henry Flagler, it is the first large scale building constructed entirely of poured concrete. The only Flagler Hotel to survive the Great Depression, it later became part of Flagler College. Part of St. Augustine Town Plan Historic District
24	Zora Neale Hurston House	Zora Neale Hurston House	December 4, 1991 (#91002047)	Fort Pierce; 27°27′39″N 80°20′31″W	St. Lucie	A home of author Zora Neale Hurston
25	Ingham (USCGC)	Ingham (USCGC)	April 27, 1992 (#92001879)	Key West; 24°38′08″N 81°48′28″W	Monroe	Built at Philadelphia Naval Shipyard in 1935 and launched in 1936. Served on North Atlantic Convoys and credited with sinking u-boat 626. Served in Mediterranean and African Convoys and then landings in the Philippines. Served through Korea and received two Presidential Unit Citations for service in Viet-Nam. Served in Key West during the Mariel Boat lift in 1980 and retired in 1988 after 52 years of service. She remains the most decorated cutter in Coast Guard History.
26	Llambias House	Llambias House	April 15, 1970 (#70000846)	St.Augustine; 29°53′16″N 81°18′39″W	St. Johns	Built in the late 18th century, and part of the St. Augustine Town Plan Historic District
27	Maple Leaf (shipwreck)	Maple Leaf (shipwreck)	October 12, 1994 (#94001650)	Mandarin; 30°09′30″N 81°41′12″W	Duval	Launched in 1851, it was sunk by the Confederates in 1864, and is one of the best preserved Civil War shipwrecks
28	Mar-a-Lago	Mar-a-Lago	December 23, 1980 (#80000961)	Palm Beach; 26°40′40″N 80°02′10″W	Palm Beach	The former estate of Marjorie Merriweather Post.
29	Miami Biltmore Hotel & Country Club	Miami Biltmore Hotel & Country Club	June 19, 1996 (#72000306)	Coral Gables; 25°44′28″N 80°16′45″W	Miami-Dade	A luxury Biltmore Hotel opened in 1926, it was the tallest building in Florida until 1928, and also served as a hospital during World War II.
30	The Miami Circle at Brickell Point Site	The Miami Circle at Brickell Point Site	January 16, 2009 (#01001534)	Miami; 25°46′10″N 80°11′24″W	Miami-Dade	An important site related to the Tequesta
31	Mud Lake Canal	Mud Lake Canal	September 20, 2006 (#06000979)	Flamingo; 25°10′26″N 80°56′17″W	Monroe	Prehistoric long-distance canoe canal
32	Norman Film Manufacturing Company	Norman Film Manufacturing Company	October 31, 2016 (#14001084)	Jacksonville; 30°20′02″N 81°35′37″W	Duval	A rare, extant silent film studio and the only surviving race film studio in America; it never transitioned to sound production.
33	Okeechobee Battlefield	Okeechobee Battlefield	July 4, 1961 (#66000269)	Okeechobee; 27°12′04″N 80°46′09″W	Okeechobee	Site of the Battle of Lake Okeechobee, one of the major conflicts during the Second Seminole War
34	Pelican Island National Wildlife Refuge	Pelican Island National Wildlife Refuge	May 23, 1963 (#66000265)	Sebastian; 27°48′00″N 80°26′00″W	Indian River	Established by an executive order of President Theodore Roosevelt in 1903, this was the first national wildlife refuge in the United States.
35^{†}	Pensacola Naval Air Station Historic District	Pensacola Naval Air Station Historic District	December 8, 1976 (#76000595)	Pensacola; 30°20′52″N 87°17′50″W	Escambia	Opened in 1914, as the first U.S. permanent naval air station, first Navy pilot training center, and first U.S. naval installation to send pilots into combat.
36	Plaza Ferdinand VII	Plaza Ferdinand VII	October 9, 1960 (#66000264)	Pensacola; 30°24′27″N 87°12′50″W	Escambia	Place where Florida was formally transferred from Spain to the U.S., in 1821
37^{†}	Ponce de Leon Inlet Light Station	Ponce de Leon Inlet Light Station	August 5, 1998 (#72000355)	Ponce Inlet; 29°04′44″N 80°55′42″W	Volusia	Completed in 1887, it is the tallest lighthouse in Florida (at 175 feet (53 m) in height)
38	Marjorie Kinnan Rawlings House and Farm Yard	Marjorie Kinnan Rawlings House and Farm Yard	September 20, 2006 (#70000176)	Cross Creek; 29°28′49″N 82°09′42″W	Alachua	A home of author Marjorie Kinnan Rawlings
39^{†}	The Research Studio (Maitland Art Center)	The Research Studio (Maitland Art Center)	August 25, 2014 (#82001036)	Maitland; 28°37′32″N 81°22′03″W	Orange	Artist J. Andre Smith founded the Center as an artist colony in 1937. With over 200 carvings and reliefs, it is an important example of Art Deco fantasy and Mayan Revival architecture in the United States.
40	Safety Harbor Site	Safety Harbor Site	July 19, 1964 (#66000270)	Safety Harbor; 28°00′32″N 82°40′39″W	Pinellas	The largest remaining mound in the Tampa Bay area, and believed to have been the location of the "capital city" of the Tocobaga
41	San Luis De Talimali (formerly San Luis de Apalache)	San Luis De Talimali (formerly San Luis de Apalache)	October 15, 1966 (#66000266)	Tallahassee; 30°26′57″N 84°19′12″W	Leon	A Spanish Franciscan mission was built here in 1633 in the descendent settlement of Anhaica, capital of Apalachee Province. It was abandoned and destroyed in 1704 to prevent use by the British.
42^{†}	St. Augustine Town Plan Historic District	St. Augustine Town Plan Historic District	April 15, 1970 (#70000847)	St.Augustine; 29°53′31″N 81°18′51″W	St. Johns	The district's boundaries are roughly those of the original town of St. Augustine, and covers the period of development from 1672 to 1935.
43	Tampa Bay Hotel	Tampa Bay Hotel	May 11, 1976 (#72000322)	Tampa; 27°56′44″N 82°27′50″W	Hillsborough	Built by railroad magnate Henry B. Plant in a Moorish Revival style, and considered his premier hotel, it covers 6 acres (24,000 m^{2}) and is .25 miles (0.40 km) long
44^{†}	Vizcaya	Vizcaya	April 19, 1994 (#70000181)	Miami; 25°44′37″N 80°12′37″W	Miami-Dade	Winter residence of industrialist James Deering
45	Whitehall (Henry M. Flagler House)	Whitehall (Henry M. Flagler House)	February 16, 2000 (#72000345)	Palm Beach; 26°42′52″N 80°02′30″W	Palm Beach	A home of industrialist Henry Morrison Flagler
46	Windover Archeological Site	Windover Archeological Site	May 28, 1987 (#87000810)	Titusville; 28°32′19″N 80°50′36″W	Brevard	A peat deposit preserving artifacts and human burials dating to the Early Archaic period. One of the largest collections of human skeletal material of its time, and of fiber arts from any New World archeological site.
47^{†}	Ybor City Historic District	Ybor City Historic District	December 14, 1990 (#74000641)	Tampa; 27°57′54″N 82°26′06″W	Hillsborough	Has the largest collection of buildings related to the U.S. cigar industry; was a rare multi-ethnic & multi-racial industrial community of the Deep South in the late 19th and early 20th centuries.

== Eligible National Historic Landmark ==
The following property was determined eligible for National Historic Landmark status, but did not become one. It is listed on the National Register of Historic Places.

	Landmark name	Image	Date declared	Location	County	Description
1	Hialeah Park Race Track		January 11, 1988	Hialeah; 25°50′46″N 80°16′37″W	Miami-Dade	Built in 1921, the greyhound track is one of the oldest existing recreational facilities in southern Florida, and contributed to South Florida's popularity as a winter resort for the rich and famous. It became so well known for its flamingo flocks that it was officially designated a sanctuary for them by the Audubon Society.

== Historic areas of the NPS in Florida ==
National Historic Sites, National Historical Parks, some National Monuments, and certain other areas listed in the National Park system are historic landmarks of national importance that are highly protected already, often before the inauguration of the NHL program in 1960, and are then often not also named NHLs per se. There are six of these in Florida. The National Park Service lists these six together with the NHLs in the state.

	Landmark name	Image	Date established	Location	County	Description
1	Castillo de San Marcos National Monument		October 15, 1924	St.Augustine	St. Johns	This fort was built in 1672-95 to protect early Spanish settlers.
2	De Soto National Memorial		March 11, 1948	west of Bradenton	Manatee	Commemorates the landing of Spanish explorer, Hernando de Soto in 1539. De Soto's expedition was the first extensive exploration by Europeans of what is now the southern United States.
3	Dry Tortugas National Park		January 4, 1935	west of Key West in the Gulf of Mexico	Monroe	Protects several islands, associated coral reefs and marine life, and Fort Jefferson, a huge pre-Civil War masonry fort. The name "Tortugas" was given to these islands by Ponce de Leon in 1513, for the large numbers of sea turtles ("tortugas") found in the area.
4	Fort Caroline National Memorial		January 16, 1953	Jacksonville	Duval	Commemorates the first French attempt to establish a settlement in the present United States. The fort model overlooks the original site of the French Juguenot colony of 1564-65. The French and Spanish began two centuries of colonial rivalry in North America here.
5	Fort Matanzas National Monument		October 15, 1924	south of St.Augustine	St. Johns	Built to protect Spanish settlers. Two hundred and forty-five Frenchmen who challenged Spanish dominion were killed by Spaniards here in 1565. The name Matanzas means "slaughters."
6	Timucuan Ecological and Historic Preserve		February 16, 1988	Jacksonville	Duval	A partnership between the National Park Service and local government agencies to protect the wetlands, river systems, and historic sites within Duval County near Jacksonville, Florida. Kingsley Plantation, the oldest remaining plantation in Florida, is part of the preserve.

== See also ==
- History of Florida
- List of U.S. National Historic Landmarks by state
- National Register of Historic Places listings in Florida
- List of National Natural Landmarks in Florida
