= Shark River Slough Archeological District =

Historic district in Florida, United States

- U.S. National Register of Historic Places
- U.S. Historic district
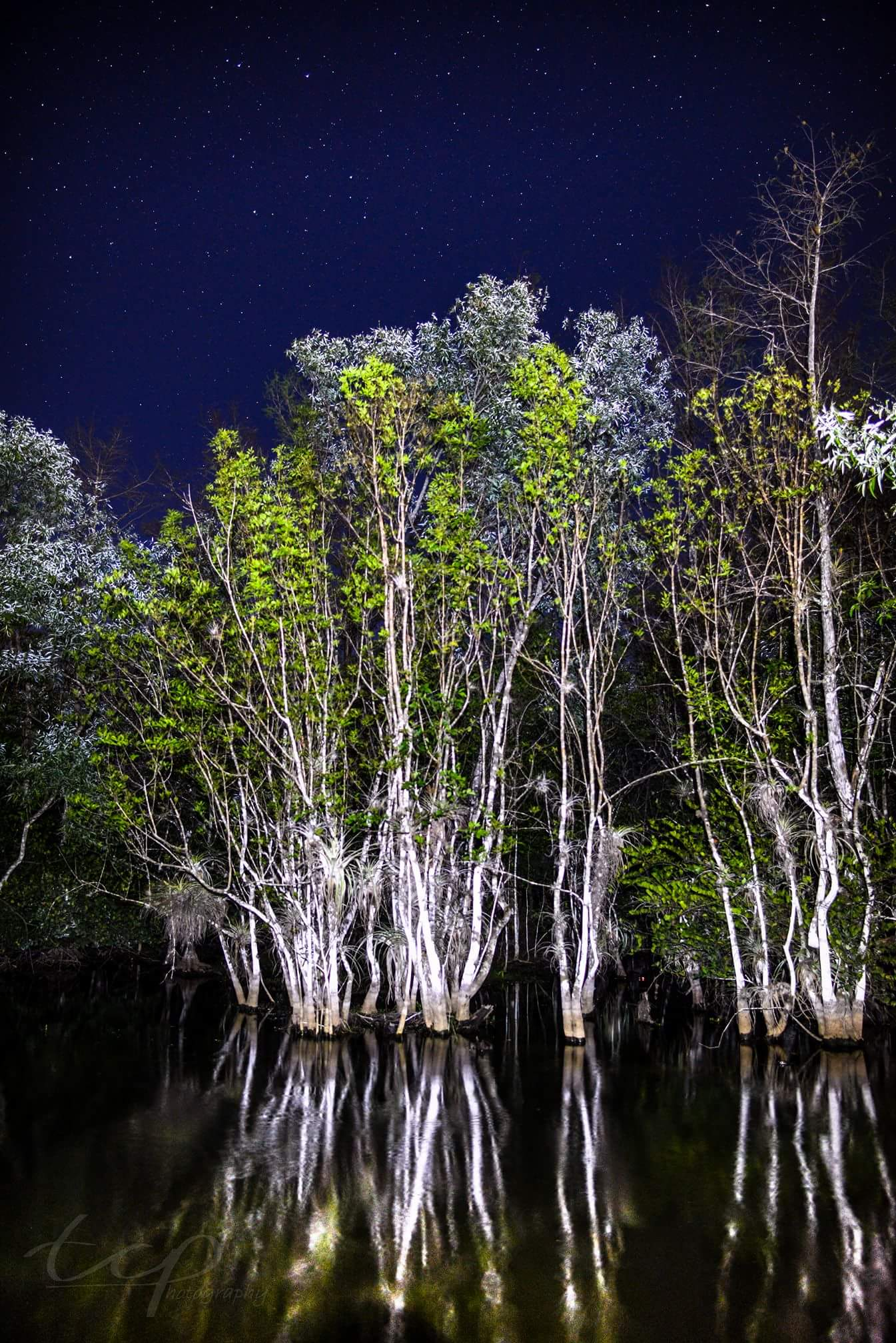
- Shark River Slough at night, January 2018

- Location within Florida Location within the United States
- Location: Miami-Dade County, Florida; United States
- Nearest city: Homestead
- Coordinates: 25°39′22″N 80°41′34″W
- Area: 1,068,707 acres (4,324.90 km^{2})
- MPS: Archeological Resources of Everglades National Park MPS
- NRHP reference No.: 96001181
- Added to NRHP: November 5, 1996

The Shark River Slough Archeological District is a historic district within the Everglades National Park in Miami-Dade County, Florida, United States, west of Homestead, that is listed on the National Register of Historic Places.

== Description ==
In order to protect the archeological sites, the actual location (address) of the district is restricted.

The district was added to the National Register of Historic Places November 5, 1996.

== See also ==
- National Register of Historic Places listings in Miami-Dade County, Florida
- Archeological Resources of Everglades National Park MPS
