= Florida State Road 9336 =

State highway in Miami-Dade County, Florida, United States

State Road 9336
- SR 9336 highlighted in red

Route information
- Maintained by FDOT
- Length: 8.745 mi (14.074 km)
- Existed: ca. 1990–present

Major junctions
- West end: Everglades National Park
- East end: US 1 in Florida City

Location
- Country: United States
- State: Florida
- Counties: Miami-Dade

Highway system
- Florida State Highway System; Interstate; US; State; Former; Pre‑1945; Toll; Scenic
| ← SR 5054 | → US 1 |

State Road 9336 (SR 9336), also known in parts as the Ingraham Highway, Tower Road and West Palm Drive, is an 8.75-mile-long (14.08 km) two- to four-lane road in Miami-Dade County, in the U.S. state of Florida. The route is the only signed four-digit state road in Florida. The route connects US 1, and the Homestead Extension of Florida's Turnpike by proxy, in Florida City with the Everglades National Park, acting as the park's primary mode of entry. The road continues on from its western terminus at the national park's entrance as Main Park Road for another 39.3 miles (63.2 km), providing access to many of the park's facilities and the ghost town of Flamingo, in Monroe County, at its western end.

== Route description ==
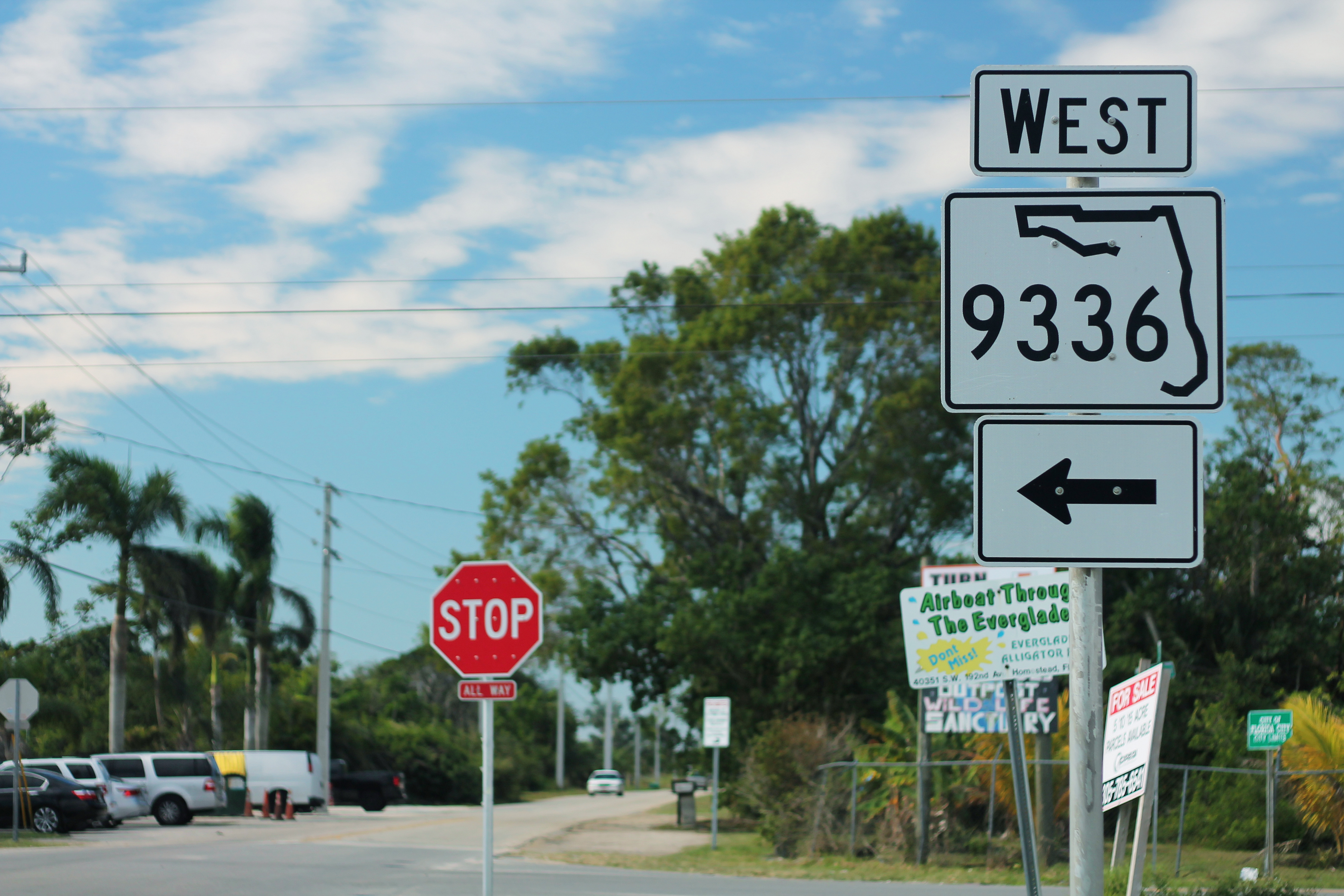
A sign for Florida State Road 9336, located in Florida City, Florida. It is the highest-numbered state road in Florida.

The Florida Department of Transportation states that SR 9336 begins at the entrance to the Everglades National Park. Heading northeast from there, SR 9336 is known as the Ingraham Highway as it travels through rural south-western Miami-Dade County as a two-laned road. Just before crossing the Aerojet canal, SR 9336 turns east and continues through farmland, turning again to the northeast after approximately 1.7 miles (2.7 km). After crossing another canal, the Ingraham Highway turns east once more and becomes more urban, passing by a housing estate. At its eastern end, outside the Dade Correctional Institution and just over five miles (8.0 km) from its western terminus, SR 9336 reaches a four-way stop intersection and continues north out of it along Tower Road. Although SR 9336 travels through farmland for the next two miles (3.2 km), the surroundings become more urbanised as it approaches West Palm Drive where, at another four-way stop intersection, SR 9336 travels east along that road. Here, SR 9336 enters Florida City, and enters suburbia after one block east along West Palm Drive, continuing eastwards past shops, churches and schools. Through Florida City, it acts as the city's grid plan's latitudinal baseline. At 6th Avenue, West Palm Drive becomes a divided four-laned road, and remains as such for the rest of its journey; one-half mile (800 m) later, after passing the Florida City City Hall, the southern terminus of the South Miami-Dade Busway and more shops, SR 9336 intersects with Krome Avenue (former SR 997). One block further east, and now designated as East Palm Drive, SR 9336 terminates at US 1.

West of SR 9336's western terminus, Main Park Road extends for another 39.3 miles (63.2 km) to Flamingo, through various ecosystem areas of the Everglades National Park. East of SR 9336's terminus, East Palm Drive (also known as Southwest 344th Street) extends along the former SR 906 towards the Homestead-Miami Speedway, Biscayne National Park and the Turkey Point Nuclear Generating Station.

== History ==
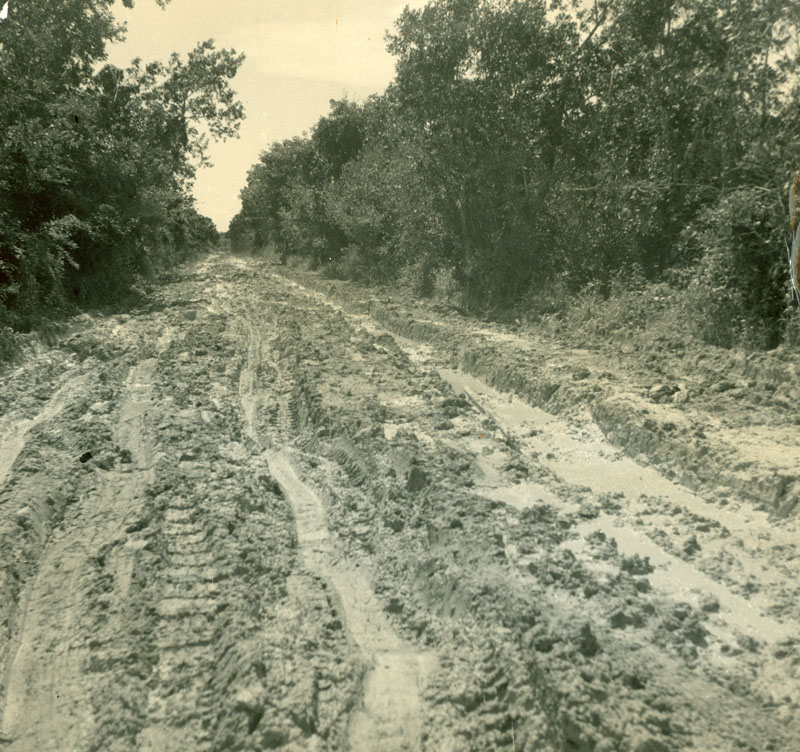
The Old Ingraham Highway was little more than a flood-ridden boggy trail through the Everglades.

Excluding the easternmost two blocks, SR 9336 was (with SR 997) part of the former SR 27, which connected Flamingo in the Everglades to US 27. The easternmost two blocks consisted of the former SR 906, which continued to Biscayne National Park. The designation was changed in the early 1980s because of confusion between the state road and the U.S. Highway.

Main Park Road, formerly the Ingraham Highway in its entirety, began construction in 1915 to connect Florida City to Flamingo, then a town on the shores of Florida Bay, primarily by using the spoil from dredging the Homestead Canal beside the road. The road had reached as far as Paradise Key, now the Royal Palm area of the Everglades National Park, when it was dedicated with the Royal Palm State Park on November 23, 1916, as the Ingraham Highway, and named for James E. Ingraham, the president of the Model Land Company and vice-president of the associated Florida East Coast Railway. Construction of the road continued west of Paradise Key, and was hampered by difficulties such as subaqueous caverns and the onset of the First World War, with only about five miles (8.0 km) built by December, 1917. After the designation of the Everglades National Park in 1947, the SR 27 designation was removed and a detour was created north onto higher ground, as the road was prone to flooding during periods of high water, with portions of the old road re-purposed as park trails or removed. The creation (and refilling) of the canal, as well as digging and blocking culverts under the road have affected flows of fresh and salt water within this part of the Everglades National Park.

== Major intersections ==
The entire route is in Miami-Dade County.

| Location | mi | km | Destinations | Notes |
|---|---|---|---|---|
| | 0.000 | 0.000 | Everglades National Park | Road continues west to Flamingo in Monroe County |
| Florida City | 8.598 | 13.837 | Krome Avenue (CR 997) | former SR 997 |
| Florida City | 8.745 | 14.074 | US 1 (Dixie Highway) to Florida's Turnpike Extension north | |
1.000 mi = 1.609 km; 1.000 km = 0.621 mi
