= Freedman-Raulerson House =

Historic house in Florida, United States

- U.S. National Register of Historic Places
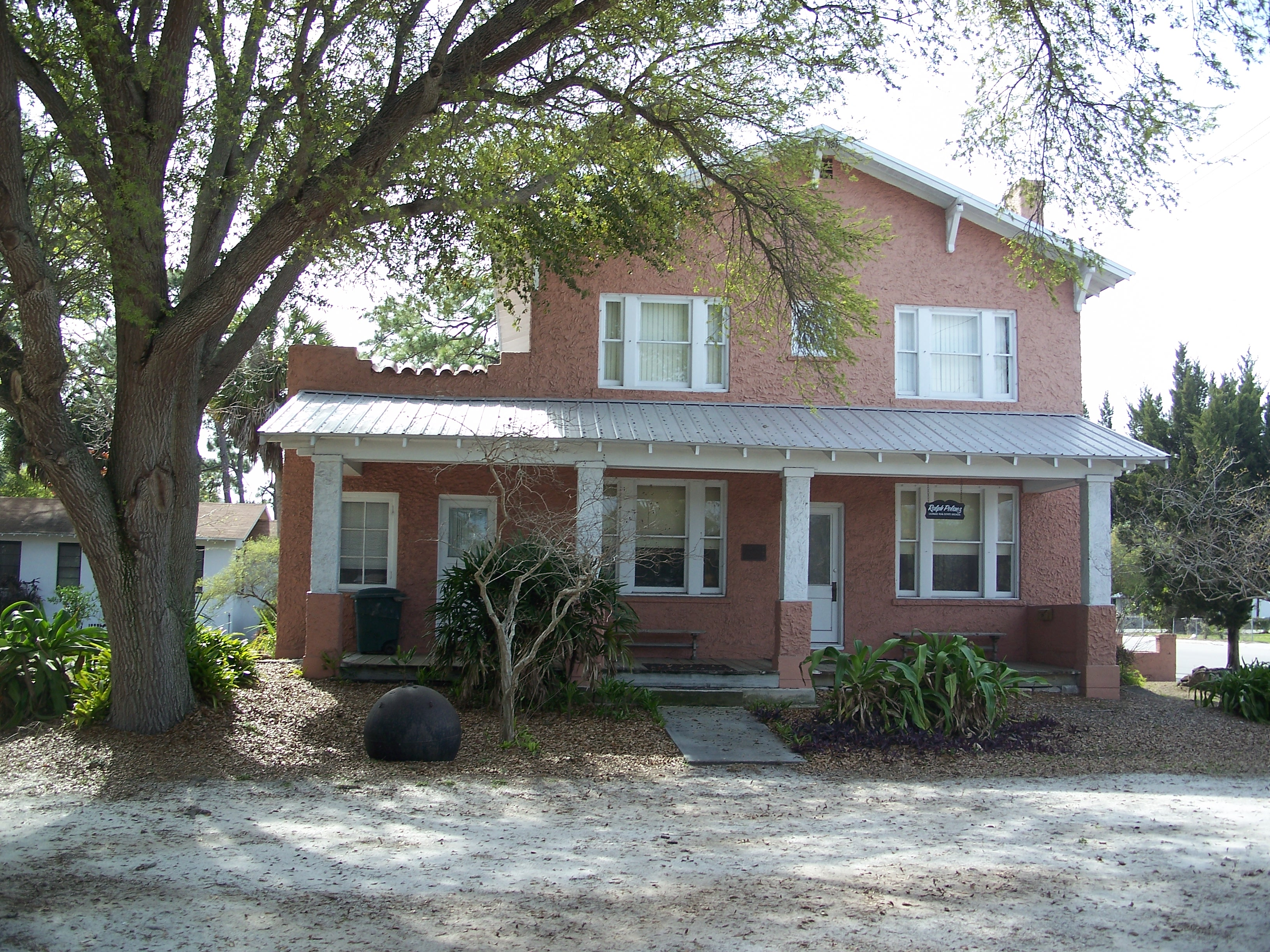

- Location within Florida Location within the United States
- Location: Okeechobee, Florida
- Coordinates: 27°14′15″N 80°49′50″W
- NRHP reference No.: 85000764
- Added to NRHP: April 11, 1985

The Freedman-Raulerson House (also known as the Old Raulerson House or Shadow Lawn) is a historic house located at 600 South Parrott Avenue in Okeechobee, Florida.

== Description and history ==
The two-story, eight-room house was built in 1923 as a family home by Abraham and Maud Freedman.

On April 11, 1985, it was added to the U.S. National Register of Historic Places.
