= Cane Patch =

- U.S. National Register of Historic Places
- Location within Florida
- Location: Monroe County, Florida, USA
- Nearest city: Everglades City, Florida
- Coordinates: 25°25′19″N 80°56′38″W
- MPS: Archeological Resources of Everglades National Park
- NRHP reference No.: 96001179
- Added to NRHP: 5 November 1996

The Cane Patch is a historic site near Everglades City, Florida, United States. On November 5, 1996, it was added to the U.S. National Register of Historic Places.
