= Bear Lake Mounds Archeological District =

Historic district in Florida, United States

- U.S. National Register of Historic Places
- U.S. Historic district
- Location within Florida Location within the United States
- Location: Monroe County, Florida
- Nearest city: Flamingo
- Coordinates: 25°10′29″N 80°56′13″W
- Area: 3,986 acres (16.13 km^{2})
- MPS: Archeological Resources of Everglades National Park MPS
- NRHP reference No.: 96001182
- Added to NRHP: November 5, 1996

The Bear Lake Mounds Archeological District is a U.S. historic district (designated as such on November 5, 1996) located north of Flamingo, Florida, east of Bear Lake.

It suffered extensive damaged from Hurricane Wilma on October 24, 2005, and it, as well as the trail and surrounding boardwalk has been closed to the public since then.

The trail to Bear Lake was reopened in March 2008 to foot and bicycle traffic.
