= Monroe Lake Archeological District =

Historic district in Florida, United States

- U.S. National Register of Historic Places
- U.S. Historic district
- Location within Florida Location within the United States
- Location: Miami-Dade County, Florida
- Nearest city: Homestead
- Coordinates: 25°10′31″N 80°44′39″W
- Area: 765 acres (3.10 km^{2})
- MPS: Archeological Resources of Everglades National Park MPS
- NRHP reference No.: 96001184
- Added to NRHP: November 5, 1996

The Monroe Lake Archeological District is a U.S. historic district (designated as such on November 5, 1996) located southwest of Homestead, Florida, in the vicinity of Monroe Lake.
