= Rookery Mound =

- U.S. National Register of Historic Places
- Location within Florida Location within the United States
- Location: Monroe County, Florida
- Nearest city: Everglades City
- Coordinates: 25°27′46″N 80°52′36″W
- MPS: Archeological Resources of Everglades National Park MPS
- NRHP reference No.: 96001183
- Added to NRHP: November 5, 1996

The Rookery Mound is an archaeological site near Everglades City, Florida. On November 5, 1996, it was added to the U.S. National Register of Historic Places.
