= Flamingo, Florida =

Settlement in the United States

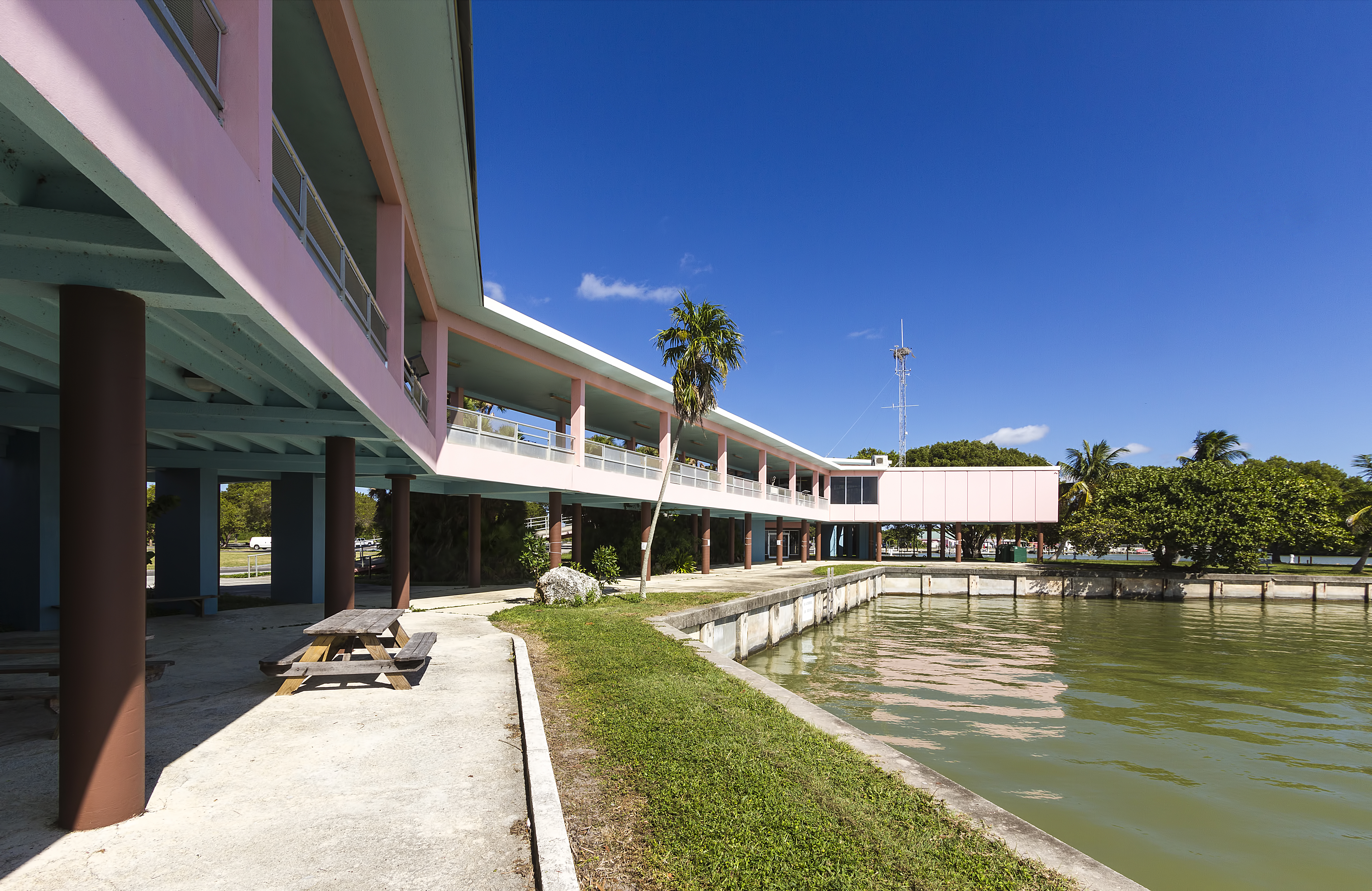
- Flamingo Visitor Center

- Location within the state of Florida Flamingo (the United States)
- Coordinates: 25°8′27″N 80°55′27″W
- Country: United States
- State: Florida
- County: Monroe
- Time zone: UTC-5 (Eastern (EST))
  - Summer (DST): UTC-4 (EDT)

Flamingo is the southernmost headquarters of Everglades National Park, in Monroe County, Florida, United States. Flamingo is one of the two end points of the 99-mile (159-km) Wilderness Waterway (with another end point at Gulf Coast Visitor Center in Everglades City), and the southern end of the only road (running 39.3 miles (63.2 km)) through the park from Florida City. It began as a small coastal settlement on the eastern end of Cape Sable on the southern tip of the Florida peninsula, facing Florida Bay. The actual town of Flamingo was located approximately 4 1/2 miles west of the current Flamingo campground area. All that remains of the former town are a few remnants of building foundations, and it is considered a ghost town.

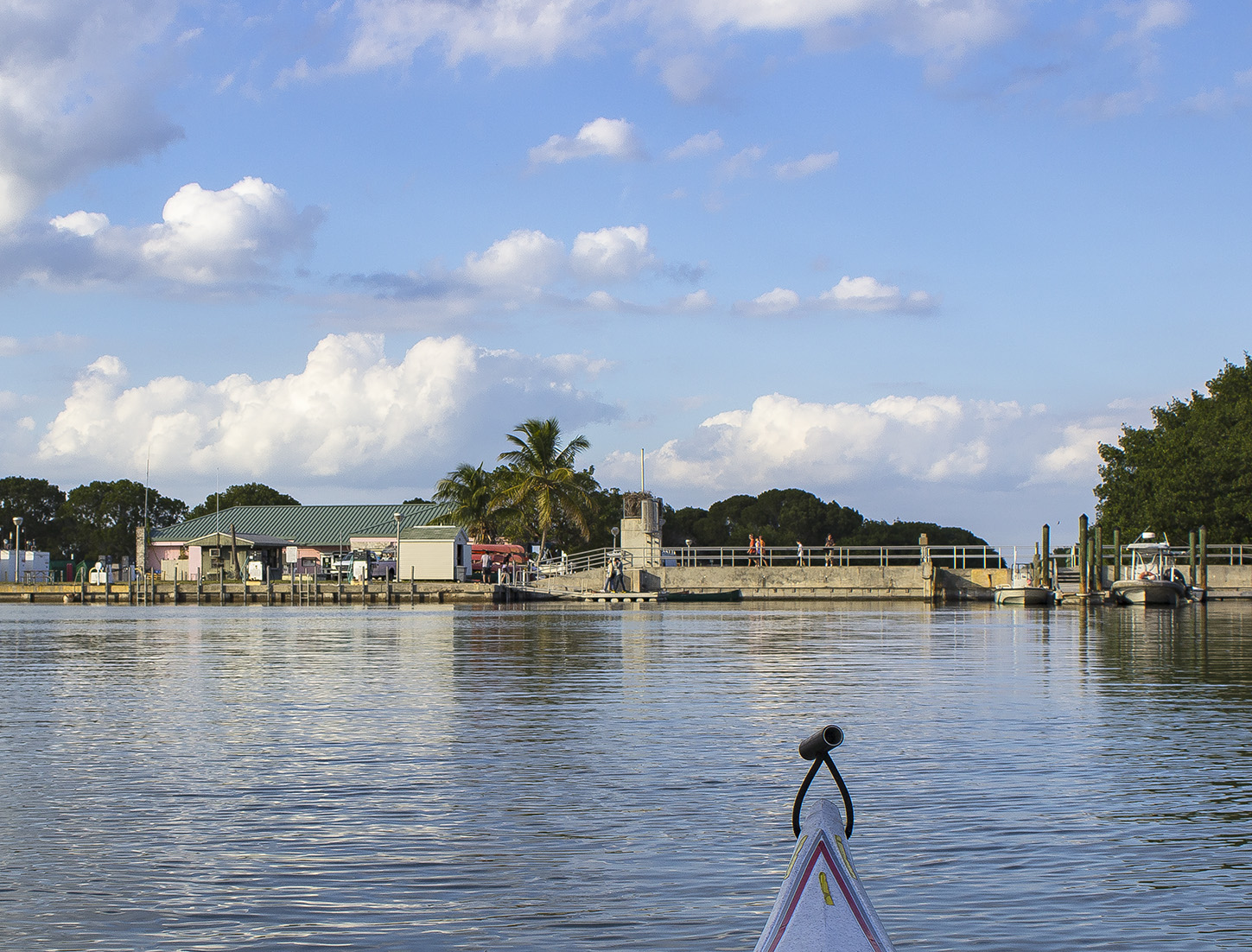
Flamingo Marina from the Florida Bay entrance. Salt/fresh water dam, kayak launch pad, slips, and ranger boats are visible.

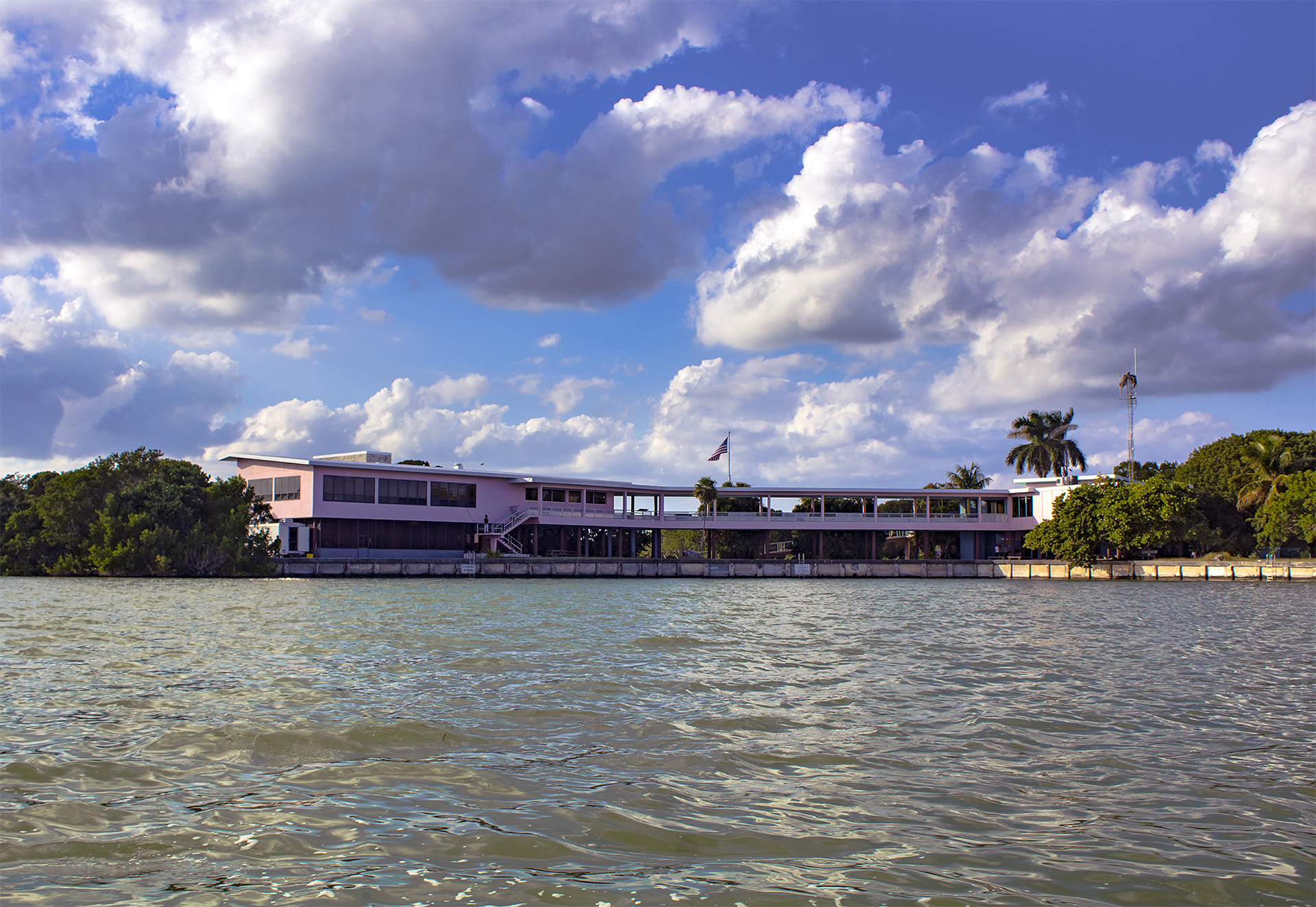
Flamingo Visitor Center Main Building

== Early years ==
Flamingo was first settled circa 1892, although Tequesta Indians had lived in the area prior to that. The settlers made a living by providing fish, fresh vegetables and charcoal to Key West.

The settlement received its name in 1893 when the settlers had to choose a name for their new post office. They chose the flamingo as it was the most distinctive bird seen in the area. While the flamingo did not breed in Florida, birds from Cuba and the Bahamas once traveled in large numbers to the area. Flamingos were last seen in large numbers in the area in 1902. The post office closed in 1909.

Leverett White Brownell, a naturalist, visited Flamingo in 1893. He described the village of 38 "shacks" on stilts as infested with fleas and mosquitoes. He claimed to have seen an oil lamp extinguished by a cloud of mosquitoes. He also stated that flea powder was the "staff of life" and that the cabins were thickly sooted from the use of smudge pots. He added that tomatoes, asparagus and eggplant were the principal crops.

Flamingo had a small boom in the early 20th century when speculators thought that Henry Flagler would choose a route for his Florida East Coast Railway across Florida Bay to Key West. By 1900, about 50 families lived in Flamingo, and it had a Monroe County school. Nearby rookeries, such as the famed Cuthbert Rookery, became popular with poachers who sought to kill the nesting birds for their plumage, which was used for fashionable women's hats. Resident and early game warden Guy Bradley was shot and killed in Flamingo after confronting plume hunters. Public outrage over the murder directly led to federal legislation outlawing the practice.

A fish house was built in Flamingo in 1908 and fishing became the primary occupation of the town, but by 1910, only three homes remained occupied in Flamingo. The Ingraham Highway from Homestead reached Flamingo in 1922 but was poorly maintained and virtually impassable in wet weather until the National Park Service gave it a gravel top in the late 1940s. During Prohibition, moonshining became a major occupation in Flamingo but was eventually suppressed by government agents.

The Snake Bight Trail provides an alternate pedestrian access to the sea to the east of Flamingo but its two-mile length is notorious for the number and ferocity of the mosquitoes. The Christian Point Trail is less daunting and leads through open saltwater marl prairie to Christian Point. The area reportedly got its name when the Labor Day Hurricane of 1935 washed numerous dead bodies from the Keys ashore.

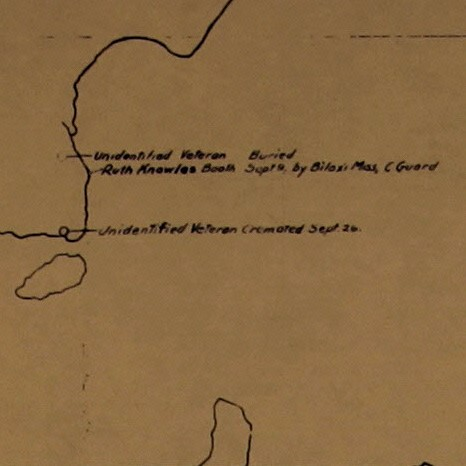
Map of hurricane victims buried or cremated on Christian Point, 1935

== Geography ==
=== Climate ===
Flamingo experiences a tropical savanna climate (Köppen climate classification Aw) in which all twelve months have mean temperatures of at least 18 °C (64 °F). Summers are hot and humid and high temperatures average between 89° and 91 °F (31° to 33 °C). Winters are warm and dry.

Climate data for Flamingo, Florida, 1991–2020 normals, extremes 1951–2021
Month	Jan	Feb	Mar	Apr	May	Jun	Jul	Aug	Sep	Oct	Nov	Dec	Year
Record high °F (°C)	95 (35)	94 (34)	89 (32)	95 (35)	96 (36)	98 (37)	100 (38)	101 (38)	101 (38)	99 (37)	95 (35)	92 (33)	101 (38)
Mean maximum °F (°C)	83.2 (28.4)	85.4 (29.7)	86.1 (30.1)	89.1 (31.7)	91.0 (32.8)	93.3 (34.1)	93.9 (34.4)	94.4 (34.7)	93.3 (34.1)	90.6 (32.6)	87.5 (30.8)	84.6 (29.2)	95.5 (35.3)
Mean daily maximum °F (°C)	76.3 (24.6)	78.4 (25.8)	80.6 (27.0)	83.7 (28.7)	86.7 (30.4)	89.1 (31.7)	90.2 (32.3)	90.5 (32.5)	89.3 (31.8)	86.7 (30.4)	82.0 (27.8)	78.3 (25.7)	84.3 (29.1)
Daily mean °F (°C)	66.9 (19.4)	69.3 (20.7)	71.2 (21.8)	74.9 (23.8)	78.5 (25.8)	81.9 (27.7)	83.0 (28.3)	83.0 (28.3)	82.2 (27.9)	79.0 (26.1)	73.5 (23.1)	69.7 (20.9)	76.1 (24.5)
Mean daily minimum °F (°C)	57.6 (14.2)	60.2 (15.7)	61.8 (16.6)	66.1 (18.9)	70.4 (21.3)	74.8 (23.8)	75.7 (24.3)	75.6 (24.2)	75.1 (23.9)	71.2 (21.8)	65.1 (18.4)	61.1 (16.2)	67.9 (19.9)
Mean minimum °F (°C)	40.3 (4.6)	43.8 (6.6)	48.3 (9.1)	53.9 (12.2)	60.9 (16.1)	68.9 (20.5)	71.1 (21.7)	70.6 (21.4)	70.6 (21.4)	62.1 (16.7)	53.8 (12.1)	46.3 (7.9)	38.0 (3.3)
Record low °F (°C)	27 (−3)	28 (−2)	33 (1)	43 (6)	48 (9)	56 (13)	62 (17)	63 (17)	60 (16)	41 (5)	36 (2)	25 (−4)	25 (−4)
Average precipitation inches (mm)	1.73 (44)	1.61 (41)	1.56 (40)	2.49 (63)	3.62 (92)	7.05 (179)	6.32 (161)	6.80 (173)	7.18 (182)	4.41 (112)	2.36 (60)	1.66 (42)	46.79 (1,188)
Average precipitation days (≥ 0.01 in)	6.9	5.5	4.8	4.9	7.5	13.1	14.5	14.7	15.3	10.9	6.2	7.0	111.3
Source: NOAA

== Flamingo today ==
The residents of Flamingo were relocated shortly after the creation of Everglades National Park. Through the second half of the 20th century Flamingo consisted of a restaurant and cafe, a gas station, a marina, a store, a gift shop, a campground, and a few houses for park rangers. In 1959, the two-story Flamingo lodge opened, with 103 rooms. There were 24 cabins built as well.

Most of these facilities, however, were severely damaged or destroyed in 2005 by storm surges up to 9 feet (2.7 m) during Hurricane Wilma. The marina and store have reopened. As of 2009 the lodge and cabins had been razed. The gas station remains closed to this day.

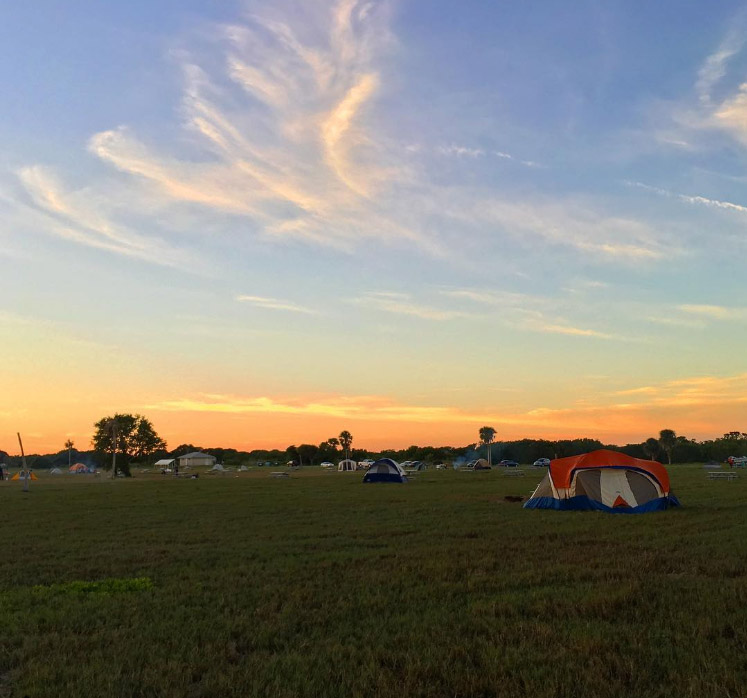
Flamingo Amphitheater camping popular during the Christmas-New Year Holidays.

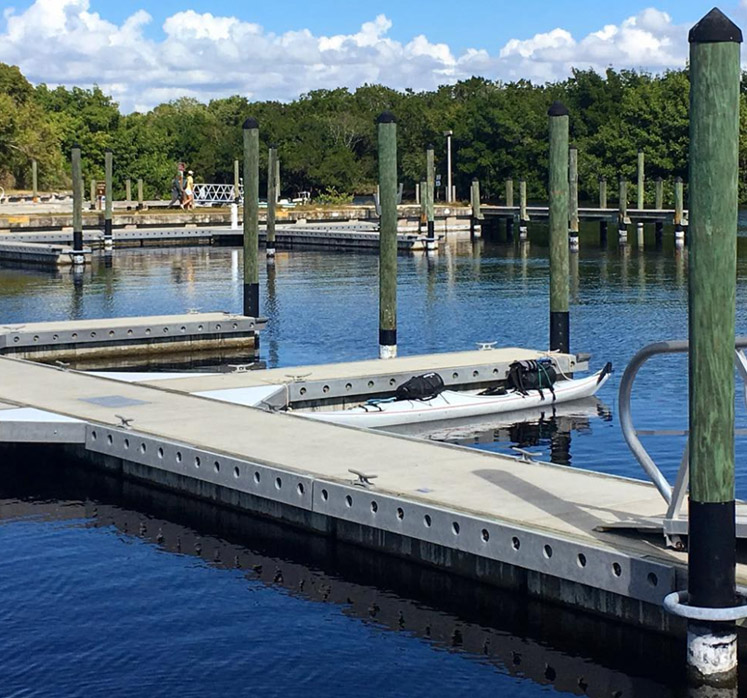
Docks on the freshwater side of the marina at the end point of the Wilderness Waterway.

There are three new plans to increase ecotourism with improvements to Flamingo, two of which include rebuilding the destroyed facilities. All plans include keeping the historic gas station and Mission 66 visitor center facility. Handicap access will also be added and employee housing and backwater chickees will be replaced in all three plans. Unlike the previous cabins which had been built on the ground, there is a plan for 24 elevated cabins. They would have earth-friendly technology, such as solar hot water and water-harvesting systems.

During the winter of 2013–14, Everglades National Park tested a new structure that is a cross between a tent and a cabin. Called an eco-tent, it is a prototype for a new type of lodging. The tent structure is elevated, so one does not have to sleep on the ground. The tent sits on a 14-foot square wooden platform, and is designed to take advantage of the breezes coming off of Florida Bay and efficiently move warm air out of the tent. It is currently furnished with bed frames, a table, and chairs. The eco-tent was first used in December 2013 and was available until April 2014. Newly designed eco-tents and platform walkways were built as of 2019.

The Flamingo Lodge & Restaurant opened in October 2023.

== Guy Bradley Visitor Center ==
The Guy Bradley Visitor Center is a pink building located at the end of Florida State Road 9336 overlooking Florida Bay. The visitor center offers many services, which includes backcountry camping permits, trip planning for Wilderness Waterway as well as trail maps, educational displays and informational brochures.

There was a restaurant & bar located inside the visitor center building, named Buttonwood Café. It was the only place to eat inside the Everglades National Park, which offered dining services only during the winter season. The facility was severely damaged by Hurricane Wilma in 2005 and by Hurricane Irma in 2017, after which it was closed for reconstruction. It reopened, newly renamed to the Guy Bradley Visitor Center, in 2023.

== Attractions and activities ==
Flamingo is one of the interpretive centers of the Everglades National Park. The hiking trails such as the Snake Bight Trail, Christian Point Trail, Rowdy Bend Trail and Coastal Prairie Trail allow visitors to experience the buttonwood, mangrove and coastal prairie ecosystems. The Coastal Prairie trail leads to the former town of Flamingo.

In addition to hiking, the national park offers many paddling opportunities to travelers to explore the wilderness through the mangrove mazes, sawgrass prairies and open waters of Florida Bay. A guided boat tour, narrated by the boat captains, is also available at the Flamingo. Canoe and kayak rentals are available near the marina store. Flamingo's Canoe trails range from half mile short distance to 99 mile long Wilderness Waterway trail and most of them can be accessed from launch areas in Flamingo. Boats, tours and house boat rentals are available from the marina.

=== Dark skies location ===
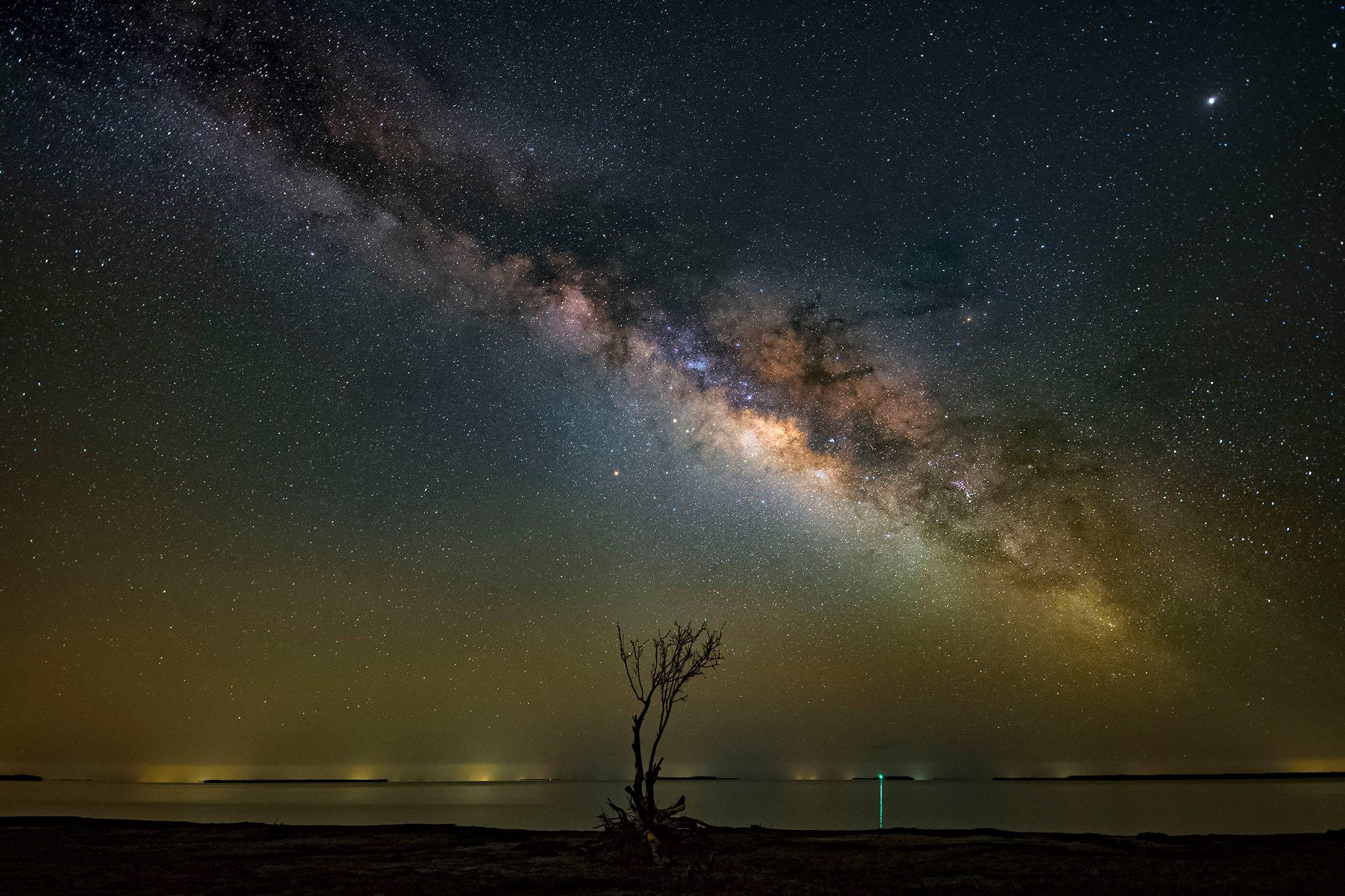
Flamingo Amphitheater Milky Way in April 2018, (Nikon d850 + Sigma 14mm)

The Flamingo area of the Everglades National Park is a quality dark skies site suitable for stargazing, astro-photography and Milky Way photography. Though more light-polluted than Big Cypress National Preserve nearby due to its close proximity to Miami, Upper Florida Keys, Homestead and Florida City, Flamingo offers very detailed views of the Milky Way structure during both the winter and summer seasons. It is one of a few remaining dark skies sites in South Florida.

== Sources ==
- Everglades National Park
- Tebeau, Charlton W. (1968). Man in the Everglades. Coral Gables, Fla.: University of Miami Press. ISBN 9780870240737. LCCN 68017768.
- Bullen, Adelaide K. (1965). "Florida Indians of Past and Present". In Carson, Ruby Leach; Tebeau, Charlton (eds.). Florida from Indian Trail to Space Age: A History. Vol. I. Delray Beach, Fla.: Southern Publishing Co. pp. 317–350. LCCN 67004792.
- "Marjory Stoneman Douglas, 'Mother of the Everglades'". Oh, Ranger!. American Park Network. Archived from the original on September 27, 2007.
- Farrell, Kelly (January 18, 2008). "Everglades National Park Planning Upgrades to Flamingo". Naples Daily News.
- Historic American Buildings Survey (HABS) No. FL-522-A, "Everglades National Park, Flamingo Campground, Camp Tender's House, Flamingo, Monroe County, FL", 1 color transparency, 1 photo caption page
- HABS No. FL-522-B, "Everglades National Park, Flamingo Campground, Restroom Building", 1 color transparency, 1 photo caption page
- HABS No. FL-522-C, "Everglades National Park, Flamingo Housing No. 416", 1 color transparency, 1 photo caption page
- HABS No. FL-522-D, "Everglades National Park, Flamingo Lodge", 1 color transparency, 1 photo caption page
- HABS No. FL-522-E, "Everglades National Park, Flamingo Concession Building and Visitor Center", 5 color transparencies, 1 photo caption page
