= Wells Moses Sawyer =

American painter

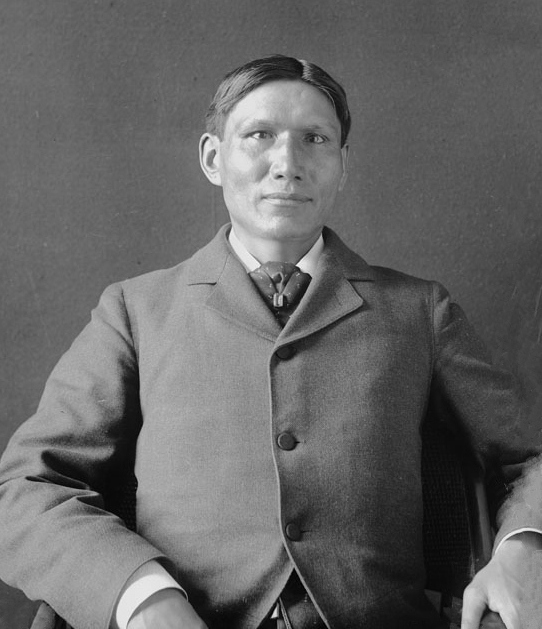
Photographic portrait of Charles Alex Eastman

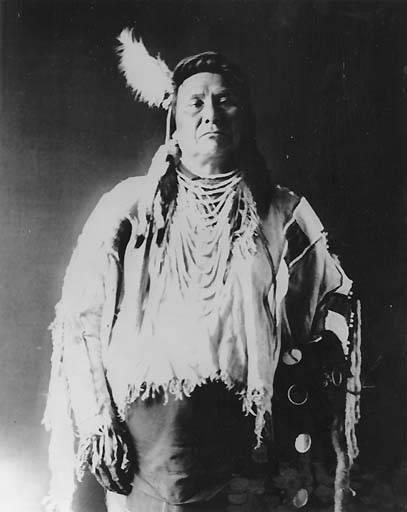
Photograph of Nez Perce leader Chief Joseph (1897)

Moses Wells Sawyer (January 31, 1863 – March 21, 1960) was an American painter, illustrator, and photographer. He took photographs and made paintings of discoveries from the Pepper-Hearst Expedition. The Florida Museum of Natural History has a few of his photographs. He also has works at the National Anthropological Archives, Smithsonian Institution and the University Museum at University of Pennsylvania. The Library of Florida History and Smithsonian have collections of his papers.

Sawyer was born in Keokuk, Iowa to Moses Calvin Sawyer and Helen Jane Cass Sawyer. He received a law degree in 1882, but pursued a career in art after studying with John Vanderpoel at the Art Institute of Chicago. He was an illustrator for the Chicago Daily News and the Chicago Tribune before becoming a draughtsman for the U.S. Geological Survey office in Washington D.C. for the division of illustration. Sawyer's photographs, sketches, and watercolors from Pepper's expedition are all that remain of many of the finds that deteriorated soon after discovery.

Sawyer married Kathleen Bailey after his return from the Florida expedition and they had two children, Helen and Bailey (Bill). Sawyer lived in New York until retiring to Spain in ill health and continuing to paint in Europe as well as Central and South America. He relocated again to Sarasota, Florida in 1944. His memberships included the Art Students League, Salmagundi Club, and American Watercolor Society.

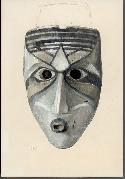
Watercolor of a mask from Key Marco

By 1931 he was painting landscapes and castles.

His daughter Helen Alton Sawyer and her husband Jerry Farnsworth were also artists.

The University of Florida library has several photos of him including one of him painting a landscape on Cape Cod, another outside with his wife Kathleen Alton Bailey Sawyer, and one among prominent friends.

In 2019 a historical society reenactor read his letter from aboard the Sea Breeze on the 1895-96 expedition. Florida Gulf Coast University offered a 2-hour seminar on Sawyer in fall 2019.
