= Don Drumm (sculptor) =

American sculptor (born 1935)

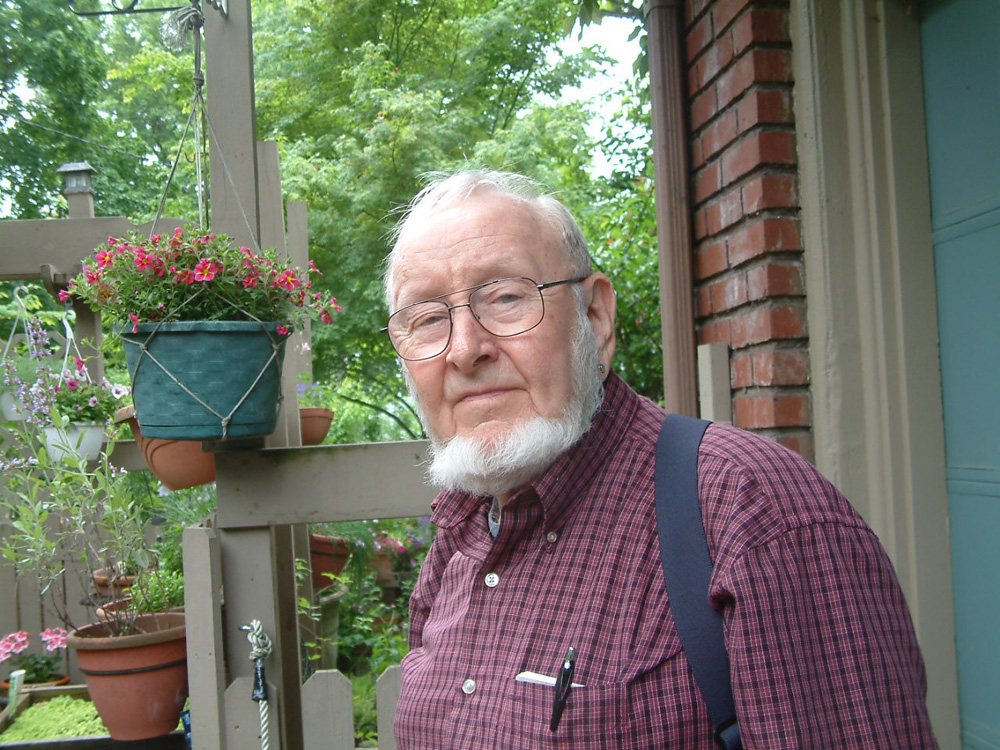
Don Drumm, May 2013

Don Drumm (born April 11, 1935) is an American sculptor, designer and master craftsman based in Akron, Ohio. He was born in Warren, Ohio, and received degrees in art from Kent State University. He specializes in metals, usually aluminum, steel and pewter.

Don Drumm has received numerous awards and honors, including Ohio Designer Crafts' "Lifetime Achievement Award" and "Outstanding Contributors of the Century" from the Akron Beacon Journal newspaper. He was the first recipient of both the Outstanding Visual Artist Award from the Akron Area Arts Alliance in 2000 and the American Institute of Architecture (AIA) "Artist and Craftsman Excellence" award.

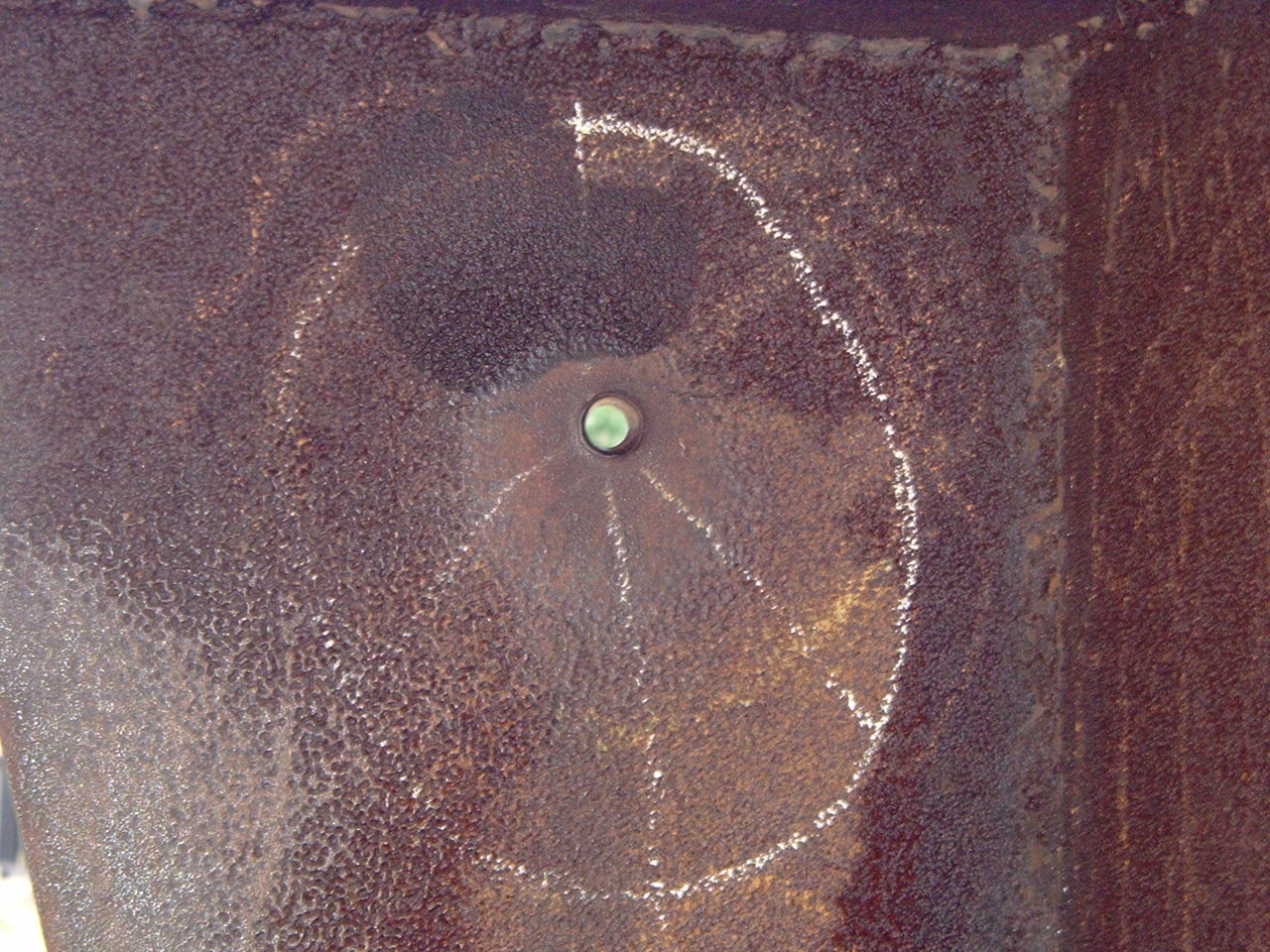
The bullet hole through Solar Totem #1

His work can be found throughout the world, including a cast aluminum eagle at the American Embassy in Honduras, a large laser-cut aluminum sculpture outdoors at the Sarasota Florida Visual Arts Center, a 10-story relief sculpture at the Bowling Green State University Jerome Library (where he was artist in residence in the 1960s), as well as many locations throughout the Akron area. One of his sculptures on the campus of Kent State, Solar Totem #1, has a bullet hole from the May 4, 1970, Kent State shootings.

Drumm and his wife Lisa have established the Don and Lisa Drumm Endowed Scholarship Fund for the School of Art at the University of Akron, to be awarded to students with artistic talent and financial need.
