= Key Marco Cat =

Figurine created by the Calusa people of pre-Columbian Florida

Key Marco cat
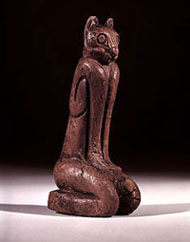
- Anthropomorphic feline statuette
- Material: Native Florida hardwood
- Size: 6 in (15 cm) tall x 2.75 in (7.0 cm) deep x 1.75 in (4.4 cm) wide
- Weight: 0.5 lb (230 g)
- Created: 500 – 1500 CE
- Discovered: March 5, 1896 in Marco Island by Frank Hamilton Cushing
- Present location: Smithsonian Institution National Museum of Natural History
- Identification: Catalogue No. A240915

The Key Marco cat is a pre-Columbian figurine usually attributed to the Calusa, an indigenous people of the Gulf coast of the modern-day state of Florida, United States. The anthropomorphic feline statuette was carved from native Florida hardwood using shark tooth tools sometime between 500 and 1,500 CE. Discovered on Marco Island in 1896, the cat is noted for its excellent preservation, and has been described as “one of the finest pieces of Pre-Columbian Native American art ever discovered in North America”. The Key Marco cat was on display at the Marco Island Historical Museum, on loan from the Smithsonian Institution Department of Anthropology, National Museum of Natural History, from November 2018 until April 2026.

== Overview ==
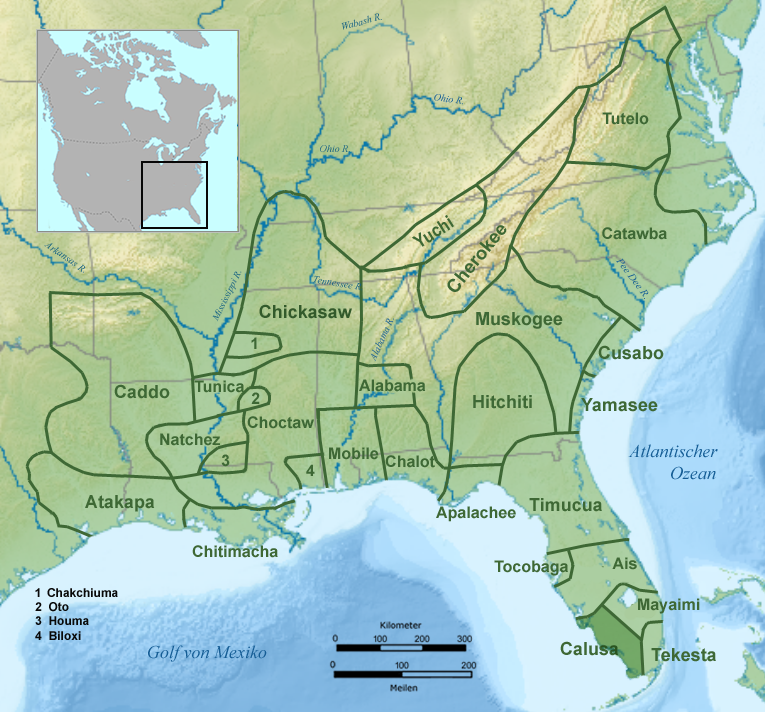
Location of Calusa territory in relation to other Indigenous peoples of the Americas in the 16th century

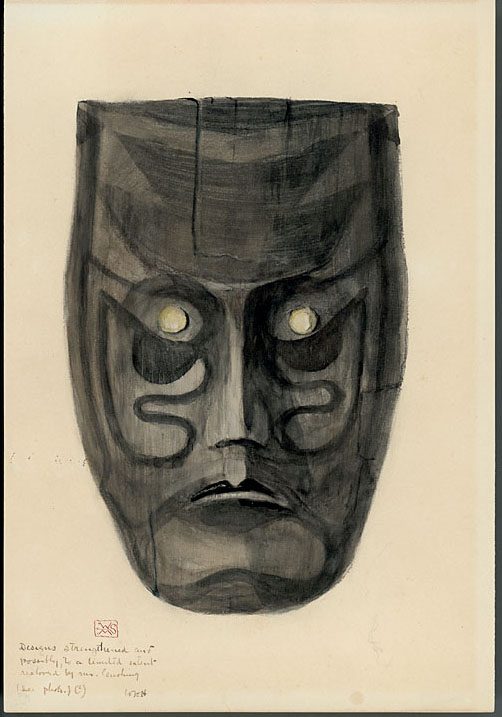
Watercolor of mask excavated at Key Marco, made by the Calusa or a closely related people

=== Description ===
They Key Marco cat is a small wooden figurine with both human and feline features. It measures 6 in (15 cm) tall by 2.75 in (7.0 cm) deep by 1.75 in (4.4 cm) wide, and weighs 0.5 lb (230 g). While the material is likely to be native Florida hardwood, the type of wood is unknown. The figure is resting on human-like knees, while its feline-like forelimbs and paws are resting on its lap, slightly medial to the upper thighs. The upper part of the forelimbs are abstract but symmetrical, depicted as spirals. The cat has a long tail rising up its back, and strongly feline facial features such as pointed ears, a muzzle, nose, and a catlike mouth whose curvature Bell describes as “almost mischievous”. Three lines around the eyes may represent stylized eyelashes. The cat has three toes on each paw, in comparison to a real panther’s five toes. The feet and paws were left unfinished; Bell speculates that the unfinished features indicate that the cat was meant to rest on a surface.

Austin Bell, the foremost expert on the cat, describes its appearance:

Of all the known pre-Columbian wooden figurines from South Florida, the Key Marco Cat is by far the most finely polished, at least in its current condition. The figure is almost entirely symmetrical across a central vertical plane from head to base, with only minor inconsistencies that might be partially attributive to degradation. For instance, its proper left ear is not as round and is less substantial than its proper right ear.

Marion Spjut Gilliland remarked that the overall appearance of the cat “resembles more closely ancient Egyptian or Babylonian art than any other specimen so far found in America.”

=== Discovery and preservation ===
The Key Marco Cat was discovered by Frank Hamilton Cushing during an excavation of the Key Marco site in 1896. Prior to 1300 CE, this site was occupied by the Muspa, and later by the Calusa. Bell notes that the artifact could be either Muspa or Calusa in origin. The cat was discovered alongside other wooden artifacts such as painted masks and carved animal figureheads. The cat is noted for its exceptional preservation due to its oxygen-free environment. The Marco Island Historical Museum built a $1 million home for the cat, where it was on loan from the Smithsonian Institution until 2026.

== Significance ==
The Key Marco cat is popular in part due to its mysterious nature. While the object is commonly regarded as an anthropomorphic figurine, Bell notes that “it might also or instead be zoomorphized, meaning it was made to “conceive of or symbolize or represent (a deity or supernatural being) as an animal” in “stylized” form.” Cushing believed that the feet and paws were intentionally unfinished, which may have served a spiritual purpose. Bell comments that the “seated posture evokes patience and reverence.”
