= Marco Island, Florida =

- City
- City of Marco Island
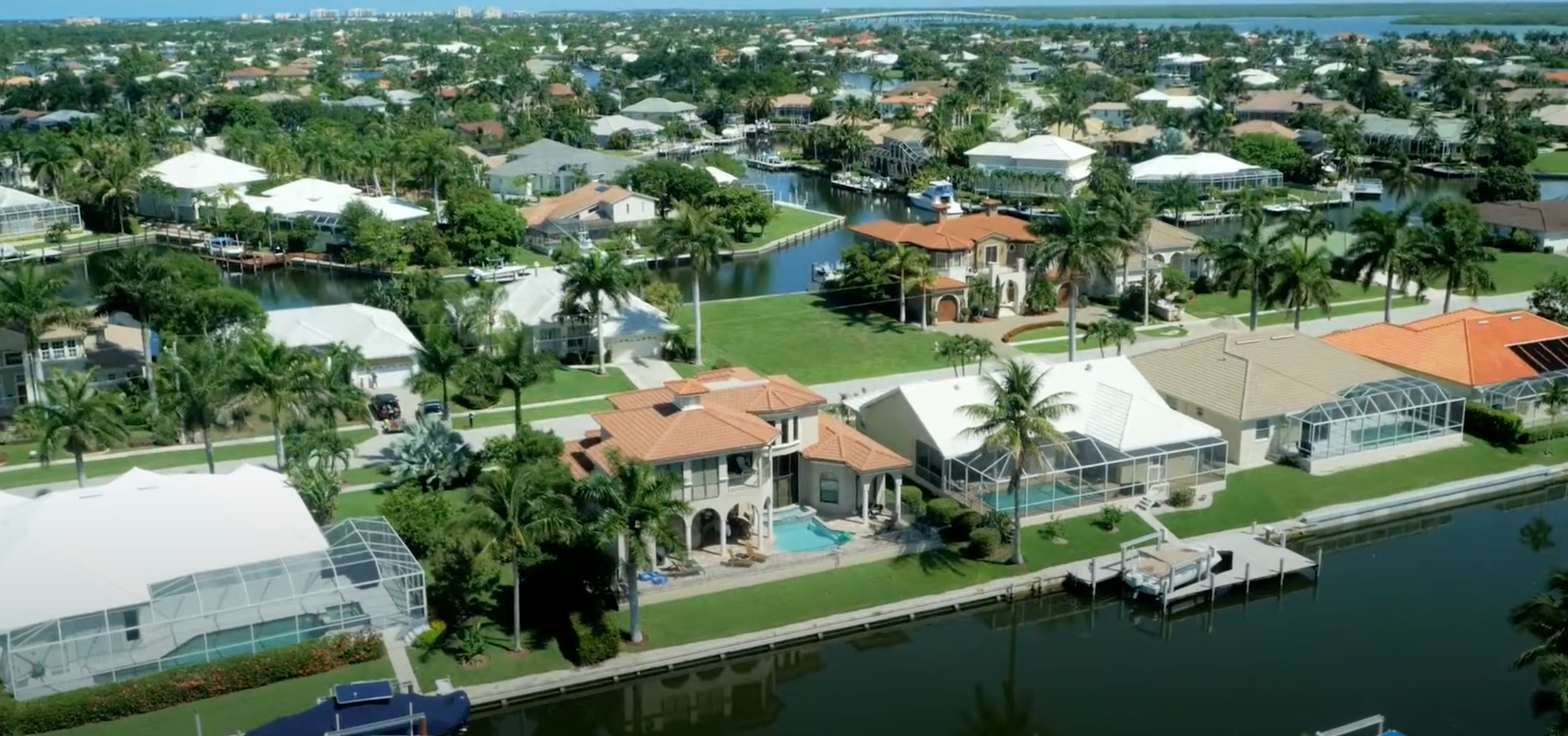
- Skyline of Marco Island

- Seal
- Nickname: La Isla de San Marco
- Location in Collier County and the state of Florida
- Coordinates: 25°56′31″N 81°43′44″W
- Country: United States
- State: Florida
- County: Collier

Government
  - Type: City Council
  - Council Chairman: Darrin Palumbo
  - City Manager: Michael McNees (Assumed office July 1, 2019)

Area
  - Total: 24.66 sq mi (63.88 km^{2})
  - Land: 12.16 sq mi (31.49 km^{2})
  - Water: 12.51 sq mi (32.39 km^{2})
- Elevation: 0 ft (0 m)

Population (2020)
  - Total: 15,760
  - Density: 1,296.3/sq mi (500.52/km^{2})
- Time zone: UTC-5 (Eastern (EST))
  - Summer (DST): UTC-4 (EDT)
- ZIP Codes: 34145–34146
- Area code: 239
- FIPS code: 12-43083
- GNIS feature ID: 2405015
- Website: Official website

Marco Island is a city and barrier island in Collier County, Florida, 20 miles (32 km) south of Naples on the Gulf Coast of the United States. It is the largest barrier island in Southwest Florida's Ten Thousand Islands area, which extends southerly to Cape Sable. Marco Island is home to an affluent beach community with resort amenities.

Marco Island is a principal city of the Naples–Marco Island Metropolitan Statistical Area. The population was 15,760 at the 2020 census, down from 16,413 at the 2010 census. The population more than doubles during the winter.

Parts of the island have scenic, high elevations relative to the generally flat south Florida landscape. The island has a tropical climate; specifically, a tropical wet and dry or savanna type (Aw under the Köppen system). It is known for its distinct wet and dry seasons, with most of the rainfall between June and October.

== History ==
Marco Island in the 1960s

Marco Island's history can be traced to 500 CE, when the Calusa people inhabited the island as well as the rest of southwest Florida. A number of Calusa artifacts were discovered on Key Marco (an island then adjacent, and since attached, to Marco Island) in 1896 by anthropologist Frank Hamilton Cushing as part of the Pepper-Hearst Expedition. The most notable artifact discovered was the carved wooden "Key Marco Cat", now on display at the Marco Island Historical Museum under a loan from the Smithsonian Institution. The artifact is featured on a 1989 postage stamp.

When Spanish explorers came to the island in the mid-1500s, they gave the island the name La Isla de San Marcos after St. Mark, traditionally considered the author of the Gospel of Mark. Early development of the island began in the late 1800s after the arrival of William Thomas Collier and his family. Collier founded the village of Marco on the island in 1870, and in 1896 his son, William D. "Capt. Bill" Collier, opened a hotel on the island, known today as the Olde Marco Inn. Clam digging became a major industry on Marco Island and throughout the Ten Thousand Islands in the early 1900s. The Burnham Clam Cannery began operation near Caxambas Pass in 1903 and operated until 1929. The Doxsee Clam Cannery also operated from 1911 to 1947. In 1912, ferry service began between Marco Island and the Isles of Capri. A road on the mainland linked the ferry landing with East Naples (just west of State Road 951). A small piece of this road remains and is known as Barefoot Williams Road.

Barron G. Collier (whom Collier County is named after, and no relation to William T. Collier) purchased a large amount of land on Marco Island in 1922, and in 1927 the island incorporated as Collier City. Collier City was abolished in 1957. James Harvey Doxsee Sr. served as Collier City's only mayor. Also in 1927, the Atlantic Coast Line Railroad began service to the island after extending its route from Fort Myers and Naples. The railroad ran to the island along the present route of State Road 951. Rail service was discontinued in 1944. The first vehicle bridge to the island was a small wooden swing bridge built in 1938 near Goodland on the island's east side. Remnants of this bridge can be seen next to the current bridge at the site, the Stan Gober Memorial Bridge (built in 1975). The island's ferry service was discontinued after the original Goodland Bridge opened.

Significant development of Marco Island took place in the 1960s that made it into the retirement and tourist destination it is today. The Mackle brothers of the Deltona Corporation led development of the island after purchasing large amounts of land there for $7 million. As a result of development, the S.S. Jolley Bridge opened for traffic in 1969. Marco Island reincorporated as a city on August 28, 1997. As in many coastal communities, residents battle short-term rentals and traffic congestion. On September 28, 2022, Hurricane Ian devastated the island with an 8' storm surge.

== Geography ==
Marco Island is in southwestern Collier County, along the Gulf of Mexico. According to the United States Census Bureau, the city has an area of 22.8 square miles (59.0 km^{2}), of which 12.1 square miles (31.4 km^{2}) is land and 10.7 square miles (27.6 km^{2}) (46.73%) is water.

=== Climate ===
Marco Island has a tropical climate that borders on a humid subtropical climate since the mean temperature in the coldest month, January, is 64.4 °F (18.0 °C) which is barely over the 64 °F (18 °C) threshold for a tropical climate.

Climate data for Marco Island, Florida, 1991–2020 normals, extremes 2002–present
Month	Jan	Feb	Mar	Apr	May	Jun	Jul	Aug	Sep	Oct	Nov	Dec	Year
Record high °F (°C)	86 (30)	87 (31)	88 (31)	93 (34)	95 (35)	97 (36)	98 (37)	97 (36)	96 (36)	94 (34)	92 (33)	87 (31)	98 (37)
Mean maximum °F (°C)	81.7 (27.6)	82.1 (27.8)	84.0 (28.9)	88.3 (31.3)	91.5 (33.1)	94.1 (34.5)	94.1 (34.5)	94.3 (34.6)	93.3 (34.1)	90.9 (32.7)	86.8 (30.4)	83.5 (28.6)	95.1 (35.1)
Mean daily maximum °F (°C)	73.9 (23.3)	76.2 (24.6)	78.9 (26.1)	83.2 (28.4)	87.5 (30.8)	90.1 (32.3)	91.1 (32.8)	91.5 (33.1)	90.0 (32.2)	86.9 (30.5)	80.5 (26.9)	76.8 (24.9)	83.9 (28.8)
Daily mean °F (°C)	64.4 (18.0)	66.7 (19.3)	69.4 (20.8)	74.1 (23.4)	78.6 (25.9)	82.2 (27.9)	83.5 (28.6)	83.8 (28.8)	82.6 (28.1)	78.8 (26.0)	72.0 (22.2)	67.7 (19.8)	75.3 (24.1)
Mean daily minimum °F (°C)	54.9 (12.7)	57.1 (13.9)	59.9 (15.5)	64.9 (18.3)	69.7 (20.9)	74.2 (23.4)	75.8 (24.3)	76.2 (24.6)	75.2 (24.0)	70.7 (21.5)	63.4 (17.4)	58.6 (14.8)	66.7 (19.3)
Mean minimum °F (°C)	39.0 (3.9)	42.5 (5.8)	46.7 (8.2)	55.3 (12.9)	62.5 (16.9)	70.0 (21.1)	72.3 (22.4)	72.0 (22.2)	71.5 (21.9)	59.5 (15.3)	49.9 (9.9)	45.9 (7.7)	36.9 (2.7)
Record low °F (°C)	28 (−2)	31 (−1)	39 (4)	47 (8)	58 (14)	66 (19)	69 (21)	67 (19)	65 (18)	45 (7)	42 (6)	32 (0)	28 (−2)
Average precipitation inches (mm)	2.50 (64)	1.91 (49)	2.05 (52)	2.48 (63)	3.38 (86)	8.36 (212)	6.60 (168)	9.16 (233)	9.92 (252)	3.21 (82)	2.02 (51)	1.71 (43)	53.30 (1,354)
Average precipitation days (≥ 0.01 in)	5.3	4.7	4.3	5.0	8.7	15.9	15.8	18.8	17.5	8.6	5.4	5.1	115.1
Source: NOAA (mean maxima/minima 2006–2020)

== Demographics ==
Historical population
Census	Pop.	Note	%±
1980	4,694		—
1990	9,493		102.2%
2000	14,879		56.7%
2010	16,413		10.3%
2020	15,760		−4.0%
U.S. Decennial Census

=== Racial and ethnic composition ===
Marco Island racial composition (Hispanics excluded from racial categories) (NH = Non-Hispanic)
Race	Pop 2010	Pop 2020	% 2010	% 2020
White (NH)	14,866	13,999	90.57%	88.83%
Black or African American (NH)	83	53	0.51%	0.34%
Native American or Alaska Native (NH)	13	19	0.08%	0.12%
Asian (NH)	178	175	1.08%	1.11%
Pacific Islander or Native Hawaiian (NH)	5	1	0.03%	0.01%
Some other race (NH)	22	32	0.13%	0.20%
Two or more races/Multiracial (NH)	84	324	0.51%	2.06%
Hispanic or Latino (any race)	1,162	1,157	7.08%	7.34%
Total	16,413	15,760		

=== 2020 census ===
As of the 2020 census, Marco Island had a population of 15,760. The median age was 66.5 years. 7.5% of residents were under the age of 18, and 53.4% were 65 years of age or older. For every 100 females there were 92.5 males, and for every 100 females age 18 and over there were 92.1 males age 18 and over.

99.1% of residents lived in urban areas, while 0.9% lived in rural areas.

There were 7,957 households, of which 8.8% had children under the age of 18 living in them. Of all households, 62.3% were married-couple households, 13.2% were households with a male householder and no spouse or partner present, and 20.1% were households with a female householder and no spouse or partner present. About 26.9% of all households were made up of individuals, and 19.5% had someone living alone who was 65 years of age or older.

There were 18,006 housing units, of which 55.8% were vacant. The homeowner vacancy rate was 1.5%, and the rental vacancy rate was 34.9%.

=== 2020 ACS 5-year estimate ===
A 2020 ACS 5-year profile reported 6,109 families residing in the city.

=== 2010 census ===
As of the 2010 United States census, there were 16,413 people, 7,517 households, and 5,393 families residing in the city. Of all households, 9.4% had children under the age of 18 living with them, and 46.7% were 65 years of age or older. The average household size was 2.21. The median income for a household in the city was $73,373, and the per capita income was $52,089. 2.1% of the population were below the poverty level.

== Government ==
=== Political affiliation ===
Marco Island generally supports the Republican Party, as the city is represented in the House by Republican Byron Donalds and voted in favor of Republican incumbent Donald Trump during the 2020 election at margins varying from 62% to 73% over Democratic nominee Joe Biden. The region, however, voted more Democratic than it did during the 2016 election.

== Education ==
The District School Board of Collier County operates the following schools serving Marco Island:

- Lely High School
- Marco Island Academy High School
- Marco Island Charter Middle School
- Tommie Barfield Elementary School

Private schools:

- Island Montessori Academy
- Marketplace Mission Learning Center

== Transportation ==
Two bridges provide road access to the island via Collier Boulevard and San Marco Road (CR 92). There are two public access locations with parking and amenities (Tigertail and South Beach), a private beach complex for residents (Residents' Beach), a private parking area for residents (Sarazen Park at South Beach), and two other public access points (with no amenities). Offshore island beaches, such as Keewaydin, are accessible by boat or tour.

Marco Island Executive Airport (MKY) provides general aviation service to the area. It is 4 miles (6.4 km) northeast of the island's central business district. The closest regularly scheduled commercial flights to the area arrive at Southwest Florida International Airport.

Marco Island is served by Collier Area Transit's Route #21 and Route #121 (Express: Immokalee to Marco Island).

== Notable people ==
- John Boehner, former Speaker of the United States House of Representatives
- Michael Collins, astronaut
- William J. Cullerton, World War II flying ace
- Leighton Meester, actress
