= Elden Rowland =

American painter

Elden Heart Rowland
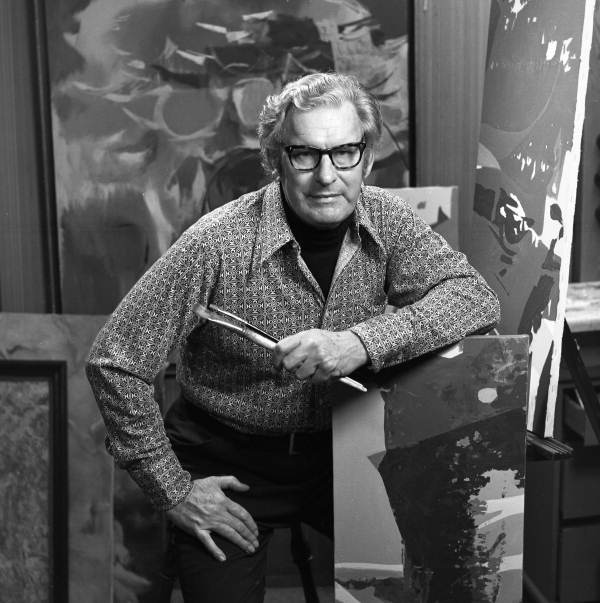
- Portrait of painter Elden Rowland at his studio in Sarasota, Florida.
- Born: May 31, 1915; Cincinnati, Ohio
- Died: February 22, 1982 (aged 66); Sarasota, Florida
- Occupation: Painter
- Spouse: Katherine Rowland

Elden Heart Rowland (May 31, 1915 – February 22, 1982) was an artist in Sarasota, Florida. In 2006 his wife, Katherine Rowland, wrote an account of their life in the arts in Sarasota, Cape Cod and Montana entitled A Painter and His Wife: A Memoir: Elden Rowland, Painter, Katherine Rowland, Wife. It is illustrated with 50 pictures.

Rowland was born May 31, 1915, in Cincinnati, Ohio. He was educated at the Art Academy of Cincinnati and privately with Jerry Farnsworth and Robert Brackman. He married Katherine Lucile Lollar in Lebanon, Ohio, on May 13, 1939, and they moved to Sarasota, Florida in 1947 to pursue his career as an artist. Rowland was instrumental in promoting the local arts scene including Art Center Sarasota (then the Sarasota Arts Center). In 1948 they made their home in Siesta Key, Florida. Rowland taught and painted. He is best known for his abstract expressionist work from the 1960s. He died on February 22, 1982, in Sarasota.
