= Art Center Sarasota =

Community art center in Florida, US

Coordinates: 27.34247°N 82.54753°W

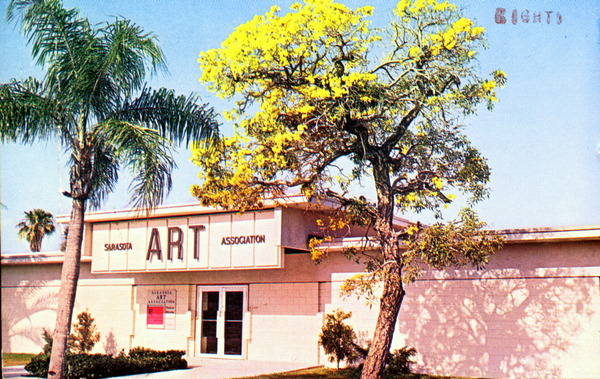
Postcard showing Sarasota Art Association building in the 1940s

Art Center Sarasota is the community art center in Sarasota, Florida. The Center includes four rotating exhibition galleries and a sculpture garden. It is member-funded and offers adult and youth classes, workshops, and programs.

The center was established in 1926 as the Sarasota Art Association.

== History ==
The Sarasota Art Association (SAA) was established in 1926 as the first arts organization in Sarasota. Founder Marcia Rader, Art Supervisor of the Sarasota School System, was the driving force behind the initial meetings of local art supporters who formed the association. The first official meeting of the SAA took place on a Friday evening in February 1932.

Also in 1932, the Sarasota Art Association along with the Daytona Beach Art league, became a member of the Florida Federation of Art, a state-wide arts organization that promoted the arts across Florida, through the fellowship of independent artists, museums, and other cultural institutions.

In 1941, the Association incorporated as a not-for-profit organization. At that time, the stated mission was “to promote the educational and cultural advantages of Sarasota in the field of contemporary art." Many renowned local artists like Jerry Farnsworth, Elden Rowland, Syd Solomon and Hilton Leech were instrumental in establishing the center as the focal point for Sarasota's visual arts.

The City of Sarasota provided the Art Association with a lease of land near the downtown area, and in 1948 the association broke ground for its present building which was designed by T.R. Martin and his son Frank Martin in the then-popular style of the Sarasota School of Architecture. The building opened in 1949 with only one gallery which is now known as Gallery 3.

In 1955 and 1956, George David Yater of the Cape Cod School of Art worked as the executive director of the Sarasota Art Association.

The association's philosophy during the 1960s, stated that “while the gallery is important to display the works of local artists, one-man shows and traveling exhibitions, there is a social aspect of the association that bears heavy fruit. It is a meeting place for all who are interested in the many phases of art; it is a place to make friends and see what is going on in Sarasota…” This philosophy is still the inherent mission of Art Center Sarasota today.

In 2000 the Sarasota Art Association merged with artist and instructor Hilton Leech's “Friends of the Arts and Sciences” and became Art Center Sarasota. An art education program was put into place along with exhibitions.
