= University Libraries at Bowling Green State University =

Coordinates: 41°22′35″N 83°38′06″W

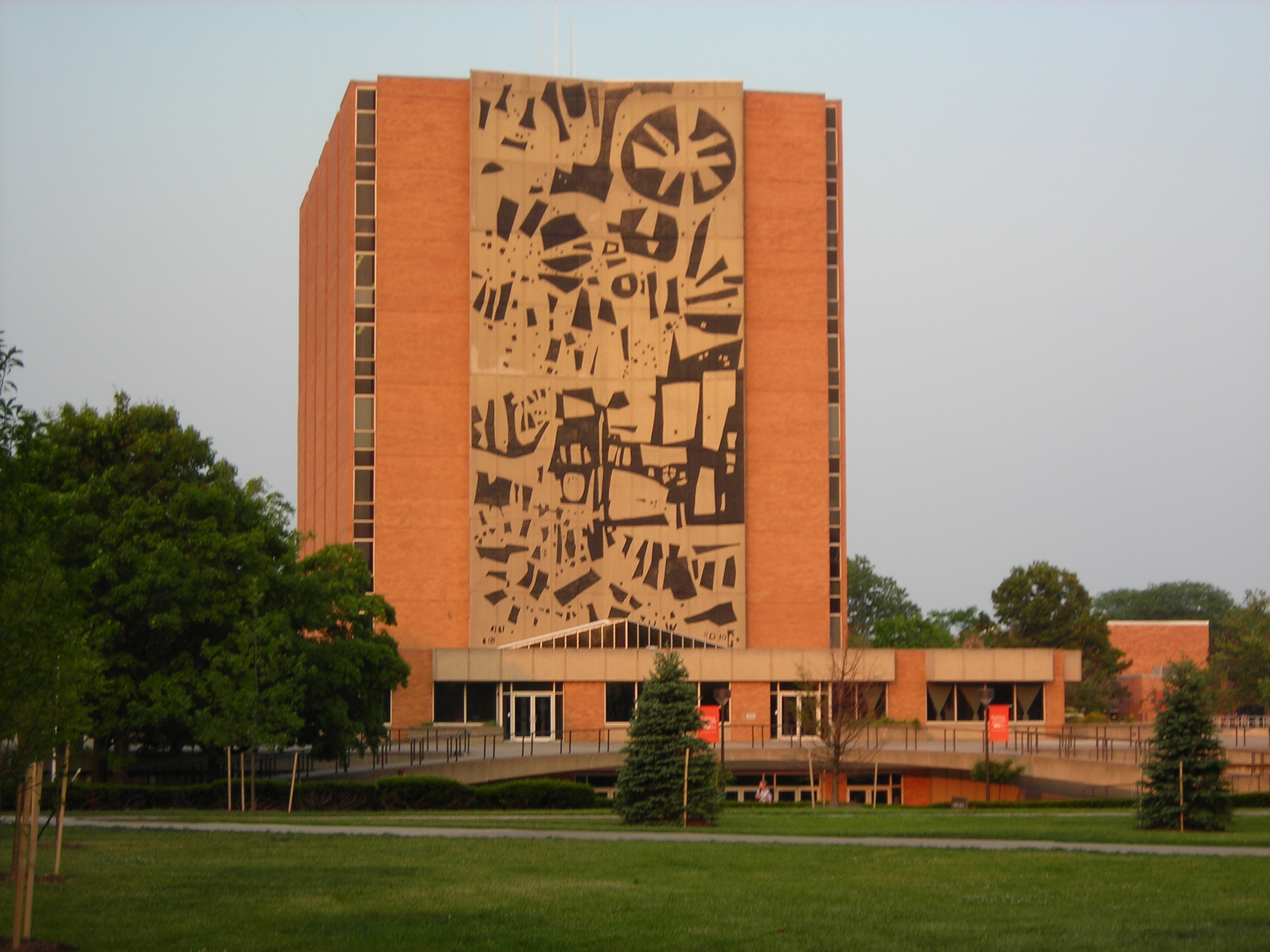
- Jerome Library on BGSU's Main Campus
- Location: Bowling Green, Ohio, United States
- Type: Academic Library System
- Established: 1914; 112 years ago
- Service area: Bowling Green State University

Collection
- Size: 2 million

Other information
- Website: www.bgsu.edu/library.html

The University Libraries are the academic library system for Bowling Green State University and its regional campuses.

== History ==
=== Establishment ===
The first library of the Bowling Green Normal College was established in 1914 in the basement of a nearby Methodist Church, with its first professional librarian hired in 1915. Also in 1915, the library was moved from its temporary location off campus to the third floor of University Hall.

=== McFall Center ===
In 1927 the library moved into its first dedicated building, The McFall Center. In the 1950s, the old library was expanded; by 1961, it contained 330,000 items.

=== Jerome Library ===
Construction of a new library began in 1965. In 1982, the completed building was named in honor of William Travers Jerome III, the sixth president of Bowling Green State University. As of 2017, Jerome Library served about 450,000 people annually and held over two million items.

== Jerome Library ==
The building was designed by state architect Carl E. Bentz. It features unique non-objective murals on its east and west facades, created by Don Drumm, an artist in residence during the 1960s.

Drumm first outlined his contemporary designs on the concrete; construction crews then sandblasted the designs into the surface. Drumm added shadow pins to the west facade which cast light in a way that completed the mural. The nine-level, 156,895 square foot mural sits between Memorial and East Halls.

The William T. Jerome Library is open to the community. It is also a member of OhioLINK, a statewide library and information system that enables BGSU students, faculty, and staff to borrow books from other Ohio libraries and access many online research databases.

=== Learning Commons ===
The Learning Commons opened in the fall of 2011, consolidating the Study Skills Center, Writing Center, and Mathematics and Statistics Tutoring Center. It offers 13,565 square feet of study space, computers, and a tutorial center.

== Specialized collections and branches ==
=== Government Documents (1st floor) ===
Bowling Green State University, which serves Ohio's 5th Congressional district, became a federal depository in 1933. Librarians select 57% of the offered items, receiving approximately 400 documents monthly. This collection of 700,000 publications is rich in historical and current material, including the following materials:

- Census of Population reports from 1790 to present
- Foreign Relations of the United States
- U.S. Treaties and International Agreements
- U.S. Congressional Serial Set

The collection emphasizes materials in business, civil rights, economics, education, environment, foreign relations, health, housing, justice, labor, presidential materials, small business, and social welfare. Librarians also select congressional materials, including hearings, reports, documents, floor debates, bills and public laws, and studies.

The department became an Ohio depository in 1953 and received all agency publications from the state depository program. As a result, the collection includes agency publications such as reports, directories, pamphlets, leaflets, posters, newsletters, and journals; Judicial Branch materials including administrative opinions and the Supreme Court of Ohio opinions and decisions; and Ohio General Assembly materials, including the Laws of Ohio and the House and Senate Journals.

In the early 1980s, selected material from the city of Bowling Green was added to the collection, including City Council Minutes, Mayor's Reports, the Bowling Green City Code of Ordinances, and the Annual Report of the Bowling Green Police Division.

BGSU became a Canadian Government Documents Depository in October 1999. This collection focuses on business, environment, Great Lakes, Native Peoples, and social issues. It includes journals, reports, and cd-roms. The library also collects some of the essential statistical reports produced by Statistics Canada.

=== Curriculum Resource Center ===
The Curriculum Resource Center (CRC) supports the undergraduate and graduate teaching programs in the College of Education and Human Development and other BGSU education-related areas by maintaining a collection of high-quality preschool through grade twelve materials reflecting innovation in teaching practices and standards-based instruction. Materials held by the CRC comprise the Frances F. Povsic Collection, so named on March 30, 2001, in honor of Professor Povsic's significant, enduring, and distinctive contributions to the CRC, the University Libraries, and BGSU. The CRC is also home to the Children's Book Center

=== Music Library and Bill Schurk Sound Archives ===
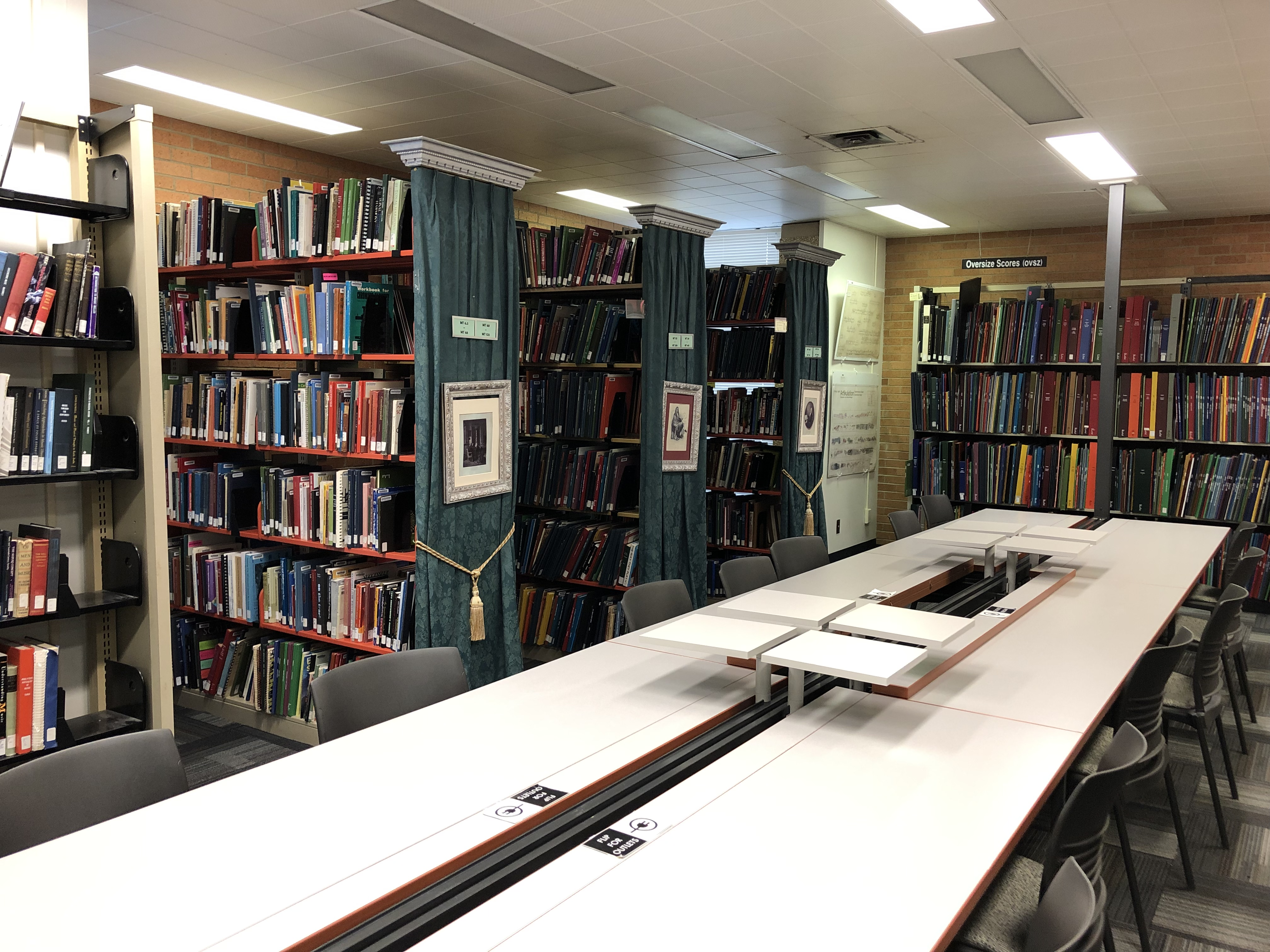
Music library interior.

The Music Library and Bill Schurk Sound Archives, located on the third floor of Jerome Library, contains materials related to the study of music. Although the collection primarily supports the undergraduate and graduate programs in the College of Musical Arts, the Department of Popular Culture, and the Center for American Culture Studies, the resources of the library are available to all interested users.

The Music Library contains more than 60,000 books and scores related to all aspects of the study of music. Studies ranging from biography to general histories of music, from theoretical treatises to studies of such diverse elements as country music, opera, and band music are included in the collection. The score collection includes solos, orchestral studies, exercise books, and chamber music for ensembles from two to ten parts. The recordings collection, which circulates on a limited basis, contains more than 16,000 recordings of music from all periods of music history as well as ethnic music, musical theatre, and jazz. In addition, the Music Library maintains recital tapes from the College of Musical Arts dating from 1966. All masters' theses In addition, all documents written by graduate students in the College of Musical Arts are housed in the collection.

The Music Library houses two special collections: The Bill Schurk Sound Archives and the Archives of the MidAmerican Center for Contemporary Music. The Bill Schurk Sound Archives considered the nation's premier collection of popular music sound recordings, contains more than 700,000 recordings representing all styles of popular music and all recorded formats. Established in 1967 for the scholarly study of popular music, the Bill Schurk Sound Archives serves campus patrons and researchers from around the world. Discographies, books, and periodicals related to popular music and the recording industry are also included in this collection. Established in 1987, the Archives of the MidAmerican Center for Contemporary Music contains music submitted to and performed at the College of Musical Arts' New Music and Art Festival. The collection currently contains more than 3800 contemporary music scores, many in manuscript.

=== Browne Popular Culture Library ===
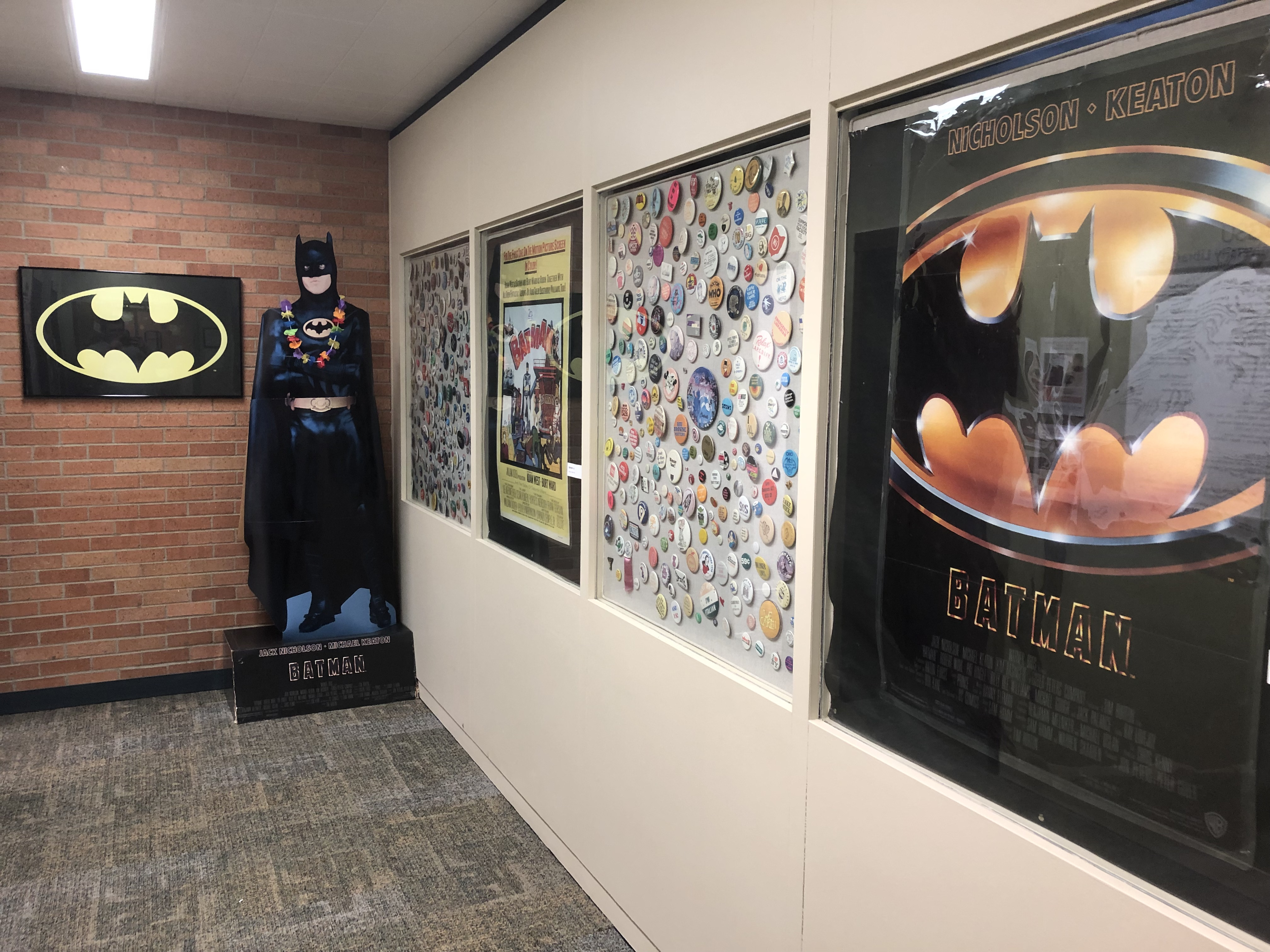
The Pop Culture Library entrance.

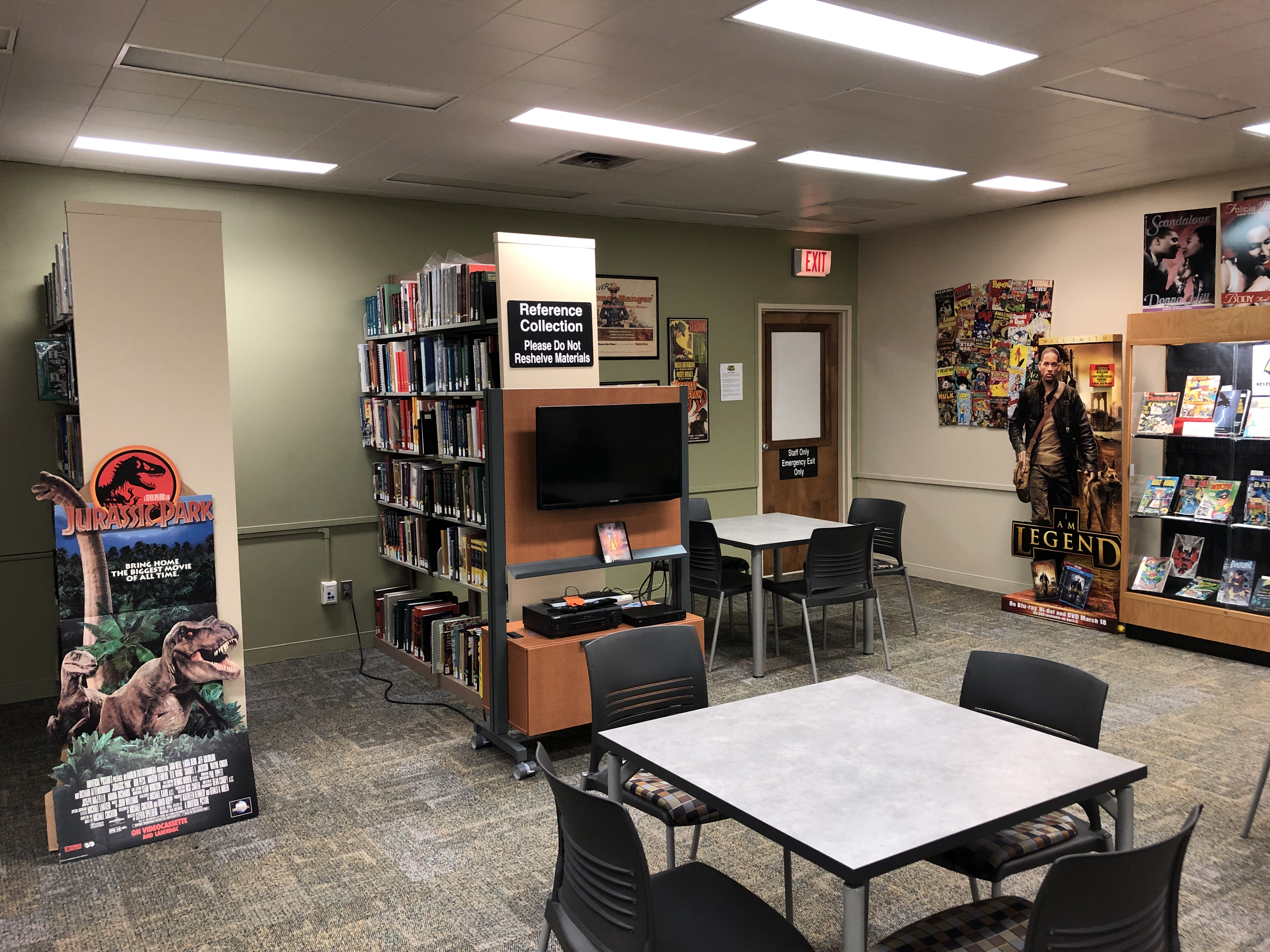
The Pop Culture Library interior.

The Browne Popular Culture Library (BPCL), founded in 1969 and dedicated to the acquisition and preservation of research materials on American popular culture (post-1876), is the most comprehensive repository of its kind in the United States.

The Browne Popular Culture Library holds more than 190,000 cataloged books. Popular fiction predominates, particularly novels in the romance, mystery-detective, science fiction-fantasy, and western genres. This Library also contains extensive collections of late 19th- and 20th-century juvenile/young adult series fiction.

Other major strengths of the Browne Popular Culture Library include materials documenting popular entertainment and the entertainment industry (e.g., television, film, radio, and the mass communications industry), graphic arts, recreation and leisure, and popular religion. Non-fiction holdings also include books on the occult and supernatural, parapsychology, manner and customs, etiquette and advice, arts and crafts, hobbies, games and amusements, sports, foodways and cookery, domestic arts, costume and dress, and humor. Users can also find popular reference and informational materials (self-help and how-to books, for example) in the library's collections.

In addition to many rare hardcover and paperback books and magazines, the Browne Popular Culture Library houses archival and special collections, including literary manuscripts and movie and television scripts. Non-traditional library resources such as dime novels, story papers and nickel weeklies, pulp magazines, fanzines and other amateur publications, comic books and graphic novels, and posters, postcards, greeting cards, mail-order catalogs, and travel brochures, comprise some of the library's most unusual collections. There are approximately 85,000 comic books in the collection. The Browne Popular Culture Library also collects manuscripts to support and complement existing print collections.

BPCL includes the Marie Wakefield Star Trek Collection. The Star Trek Collection includes Star Trek memorabilia given to the Popular Culture Library principally by Marie Wakefield but also contains items received from Sandra Springer and other miscellaneous sources. The collection consists of a wide range of materials including, but not limited to, books, journals, clothing items, models, posters, games, puzzles, greeting cards, playing and trading cards, and calendars.

=== Center for Archival Collections ===
The Center for Archival Collections is an archives and manuscripts repository within the University Libraries at Bowling Green State University. The primary mission of the CAC is to actively acquire, preserve, and make accessible to researchers historical materials in Northwest Ohio. In addition, it houses the BGSU University Archives, the Historical Collections of the Great Lakes, a rare books collection, special collections, and the National Student Affairs Archives.

The collection emphasizes local history, Great Lakes maritime history, women's history, the Civil War, education, and all aspects of northwest Ohio's social, cultural, economic, and industrial history.

==== Historical Collections of the Great Lakes ====
The Historical Collections of the Great Lakes (HCGL) is part of the Center for Archival Collections at Bowling Green State University. Its purpose is to collect, preserve, and make historical materials documenting the Great Lakes region and connecting waterways available to scholars, students, and the public. The HCGL's collections include materials related to the commercial shipping, shipbuilding, navigation, maritime law, commercial fishing, shipwrecks, yachting, labor history, popular literature, freshwater ecology, maritime culture, and the history of Great Lakes ports. The types of materials include manuscripts, newspaper clippings, photographs, maps, vessel data sheets, maritime architectural drawings, and published materials. In 2017 this collection received a large donation of materials from the National Museum of the Great Lakes.

=== Northwest Ohio Regional Book Depository ===
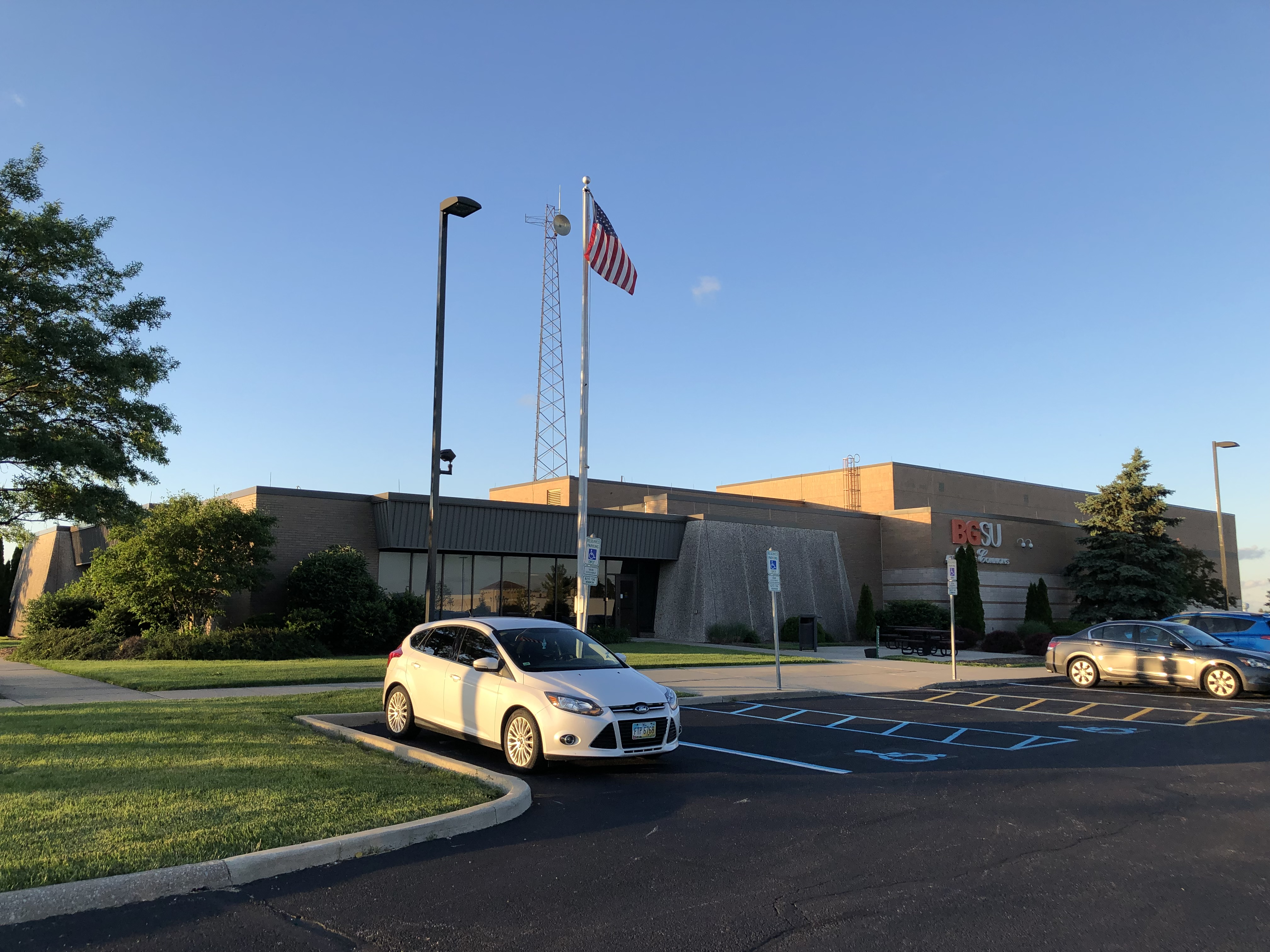
BGSU at Levis Commons hosts the Northwest Regional Book Depository

The Northwest Ohio Regional Book Depository is a storage facility in Perrysburg, Ohio containing BGSU and University of Toledo library materials. The building can hold up to 1.8 million items.
