= Tommie Barfield =

American educator

Tommie (Tommy) Camilla Stephens Barfield (1888–1949) was instrumental in the education system of Collier County, Florida, as its first School Superintendent. Tommie Barfield Elementary School, at which her Great Floridian plaque is located, was named for her. Tommie moved to Marco Island in 1901 with her family and married James Madison Barfield in 1906. In 1910, she turned her home into a hotel and began to make and sell jellies and candies to her guests.

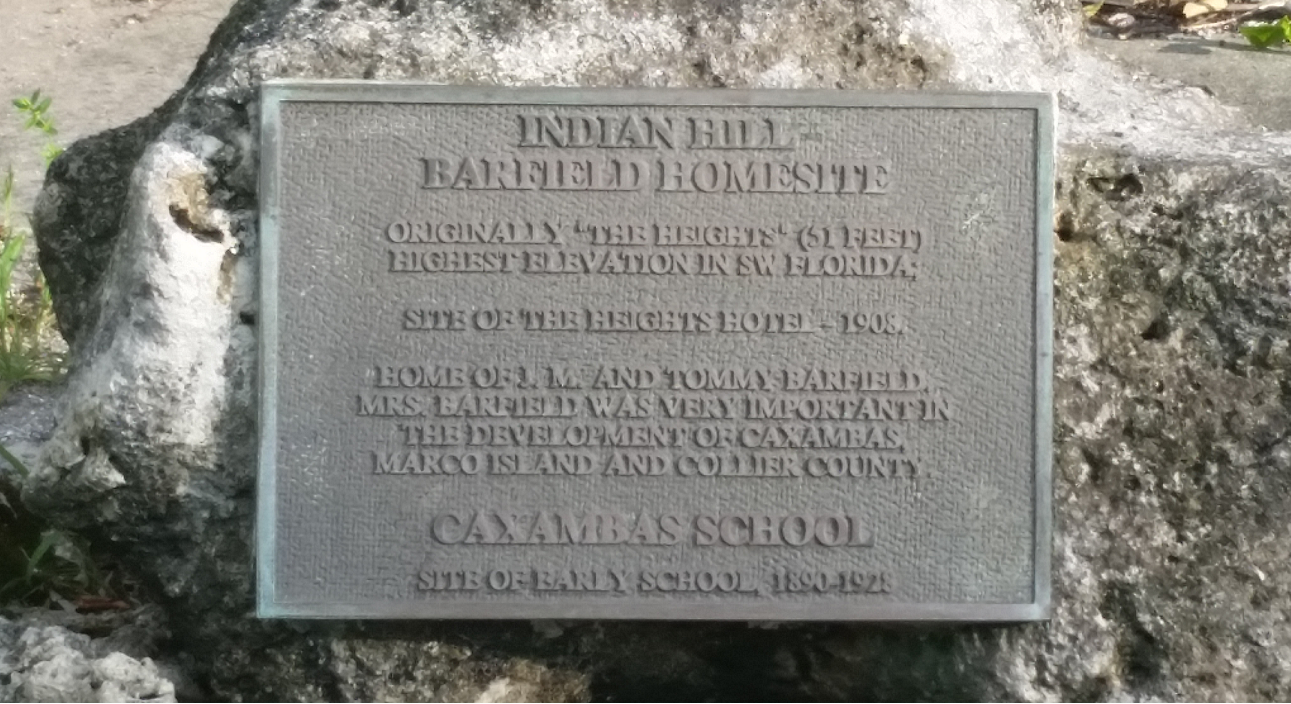
Indian Hill Street Plaque
