= Helen Alton Sawyer =

American painter

Helen Alton Sawyer (1900–1999) was an American painter.

Born in Washington, D.C., Sawyer was the daughter of painter Wells Moses Sawyer who was one of her teachers. As a child she spent much time in Spain. She received instruction at the National Academy of Design and the Art Students League of New York, and on Cape Cod took lessons with Charles Hawthorne, another of whose students, Jerry Farnsworth, she was to later marry, although she retained her maiden name for her career. The couple remained on Cape Cod, founding an art school in 1933 and living near North Truro. In 1943 they founded another school, in Sarasota, Florida. Sawyer would go on to spend more than fifty years living and working in Sarasota, becoming a noted member of the local artistic community.

Sawyer was elected an associate of the National Academy of Design in 1937, becoming an Academician in 1950. Organizations to which she belonged include the National Association of Women Artists, the National Arts Club, Washington Society of Artists, the Hudson Valley Art Association, Washington Art Club; Yonkers Art Association, New York; and Provincetown Art Association. A still-life by Sawyer is owned by the High Museum of Art.
