= Marco Island Historical Museum =

Coordinates: 25.9332°N 81.7159°W

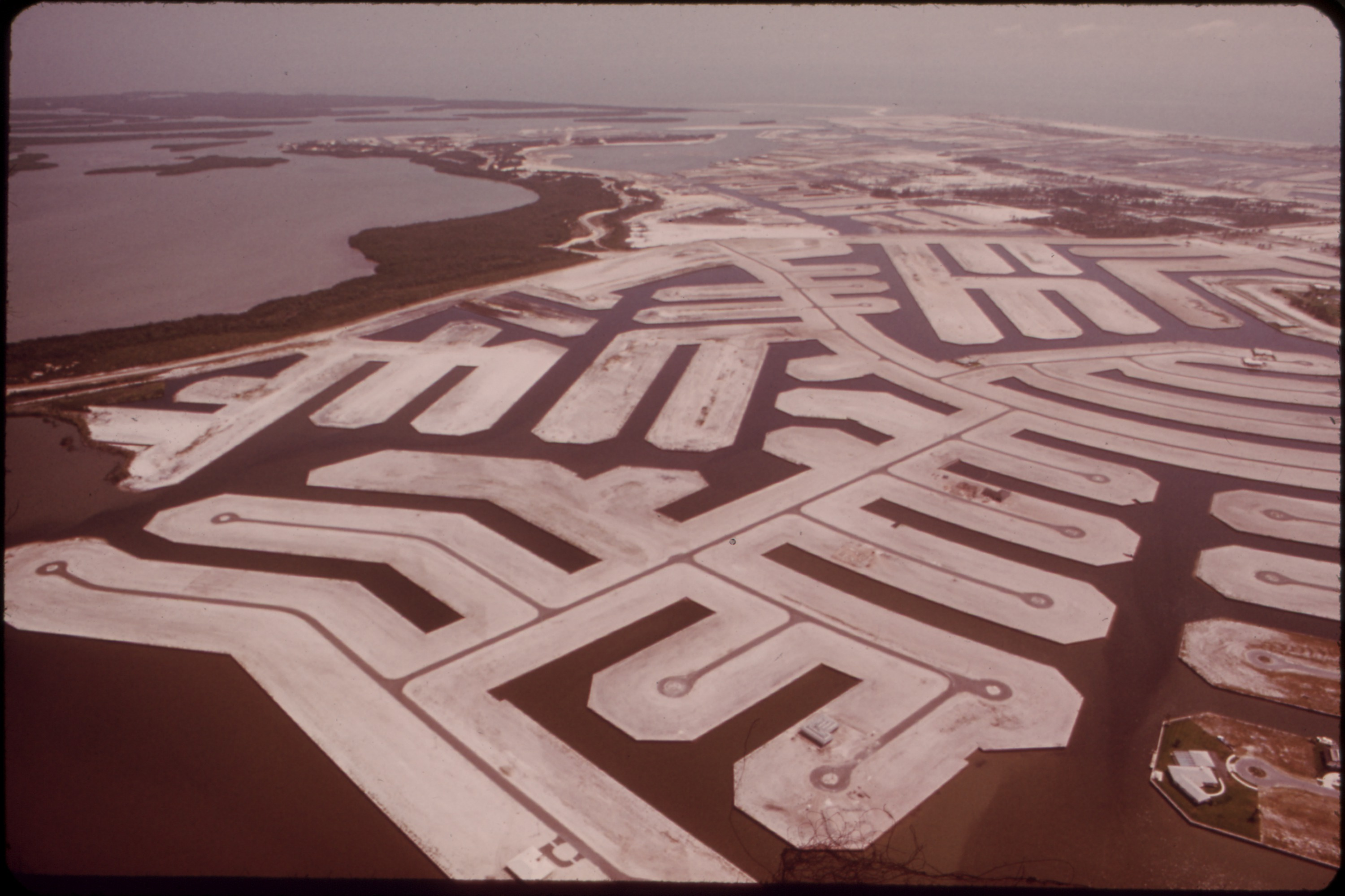
Aerial photo of Marco Island development 1970

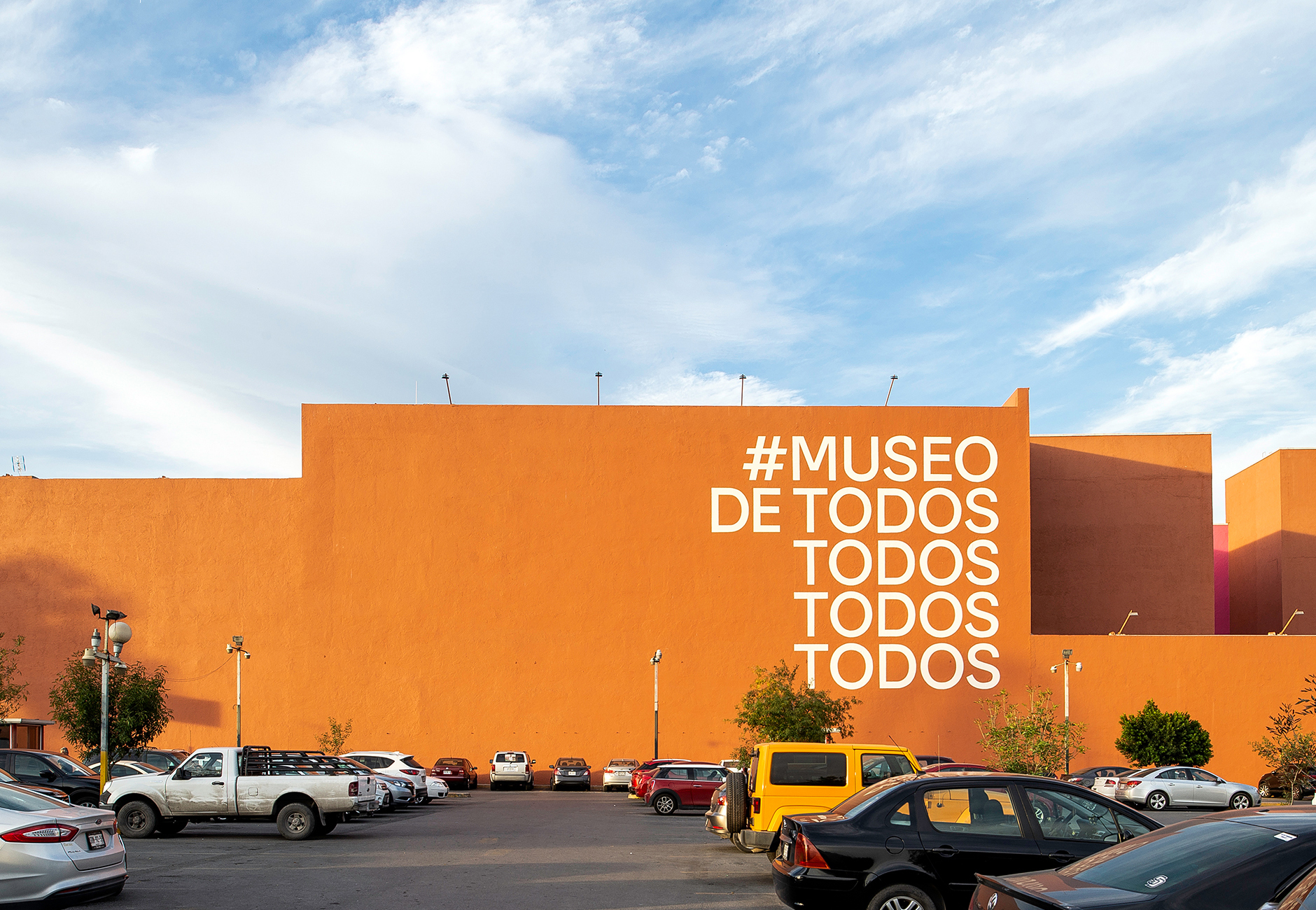
Marco Island Historical Museum

Marco Island Historical Museum is a history museum on Marco Island, Florida, Collier County, Florida. It is operated by the Marco Island Historical Society and is part of the Collier County Museum System. Its exhibitions include information on the Calusa Indians and the history of development on Marco Island.
