= Tichkematse =

Tichkematse, also called "Squint Eyes" or Quchkeimus (Cheyenne: Tótšėške'ematsénéhe; c. 1857–1932) was a Cheyenne artist and collector who worked for the Smithsonian Institution in Washington, D.C., between 1879 and 1881.

He is known for his ledger art, begun in the period from 1875 to 1878 while he was held as a prisoner of war at Fort Marion in Florida. He continued to make ledger art after his release. His work is part of the Smithsonian Institution collection and it published a book of his drawings.

He also was known for his expertise as a collector of bird and mammal specimens, and Cheyenne crafts. During this period, he also worked with anthropologist Frank Hamilton Cushing in documenting Plains Indian Sign Language. He is also remembered as a Native American artist who painted many murals of Indian life. Leaving hints of Indian records of hunting, military feats, and day-to-day life. After returning to his tribe and leaving the Smithsonian, he continued as a taxidermist by sending many biological specimens to the Smithsonian.

== Early life and education ==
Tichkemtase was born in about 1857 in the Southern Tsitsistas/Suhtai (Cheyenne community), the location would later be present-day Oklahoma. Not much of his early life is known before his capture by the US army aged 18. In 1875, Tickmatase alongside 71 other native men and women was accused of committing "crimes against the US". All of them were imprisoned without trial and forcefully transported to a US army prison named Fort Marion or Castillo de San Marcos in St. Augustine, Florida, in May 1875.

The goal of the fort was to assimilate the native prisoners to give up their Indian ways so they can adapt to American customs and society. The commander of the fort and the leader of the program, Richard Henry Pratt, forced the members of the prison to undertake many classes in English language, arts, and trades. After 3 years of assimilation at Fort Marion, Tichkemtase joined the Hampton Institute in Virginia. Within the institute, Tichkemtase was trained in English vocational skills and trades while learning other Euro-American cultures and religions. It is within this school where Tichkemtase proved himself to be a talented student and impressed his instructors enough to recommend him to a position to learn taxidermy of animal specimens at the Smithsonian Institution.

== Life as Smithsonian employee ==
From 1879 until 1881, Tichkemtase worked as a Smithsonian visitor guide. His ability to demonstrate and explain the functions of Indian exhibits and artifacts brought him much attention for his knowledge of Indian life. Working at the museum also introduced Tichkemtase to fellow Native Indian George Tsaroff. George Tsoarff is a Unangan man from Alaska's Aleutian Islands[4] and another early Indigenous Smithsonian employee. Together with Tsoarff, he and Tichkemtase guided visitors through the museum together. As a member of the Smithsonian, they cleaned up many misconceptions regarding American Indian culture and explained the functions of myriad Indian artifacts that are elusive to people outside of the communities.

Frank Hamilton, another anthropologist at the Smithsonian, invited Tichkemtase on an anthropological collection work. Together with other members of the Smithsonian, they journey through the Grand Canon Region of the United States and collected artifacts from the Zuni, Hopi, and Coconino Native communities.

While working at the Smithsonian, Tichkemtase highlighted one aspect of Indian culture that was not well known at the time: Indian art. As an Indian artist, Tichkemtase created many murals of Indian life depicting Indians in hunting, militaristic endeavors, and day-to-day life.

== Return to tribe ==
In 1881, Tichkemtase returned to his Cheyenne community. Nonetheless, Tichkemtase did not halt his work for the Smithsonian. He continued to send biological specimens of birds and more art pieces depicting Indian dance, buffalo hunts, and battles between Indian groups.

Later, he worked as an Indian scout for the US army and married another Cheyenne woman in 1890. He died in November 1932 at 76 years old.

== Works ==
- Tichkematse (1887). Tichkematse Book of Drawings, 1887 April.

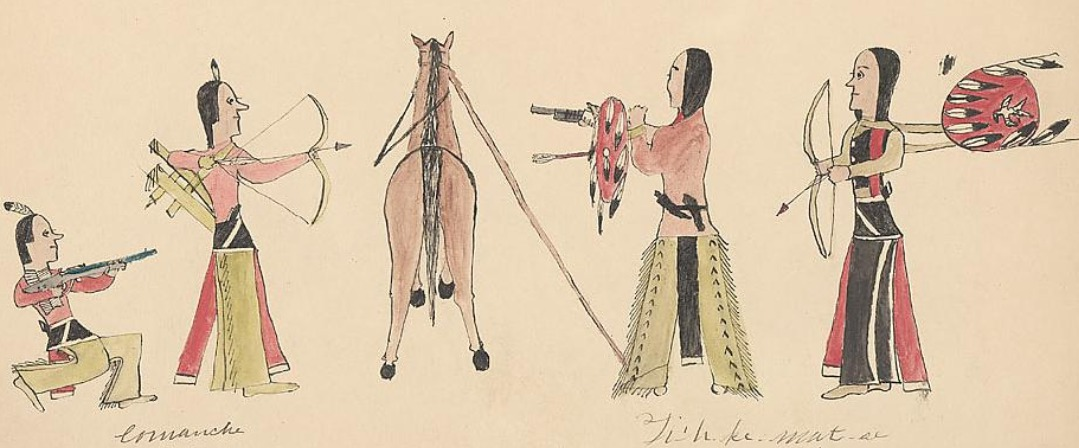
"Meeting between Comanche and Cheyenne Warriors." Drawing by Tichkematse (1879).
