= Pepper–Hearst expedition =

Expedition of 1895-1897 on the west coast of Florida

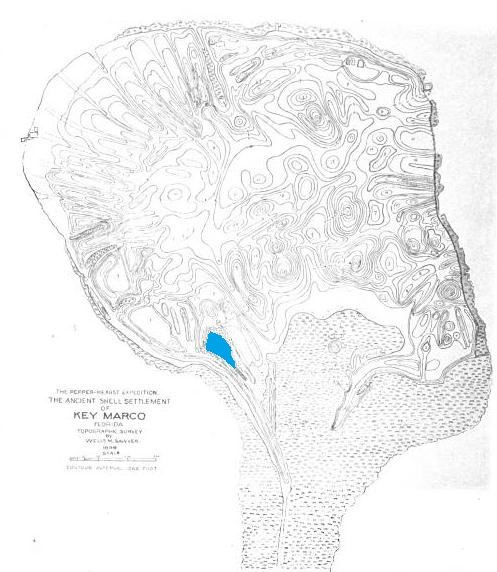
Map of Key Marco, showing the pond known as the "Court of the Pile Dwellers" in blue. The pond's name refers to Cushing's proposal that the people of Key Marco had lived on pile dwellings over the water, based on his finds of toppled pilings.

The Pepper–Hearst expedition of 1895–1897 on the west coast of Florida was sponsored by Dr. William Pepper and philanthropist Phoebe Hearst, and led by the anthropologist Frank Hamilton Cushing. The pre–Columbian finds demonstrate a Shell Age phase of human development and culture.

== Background ==
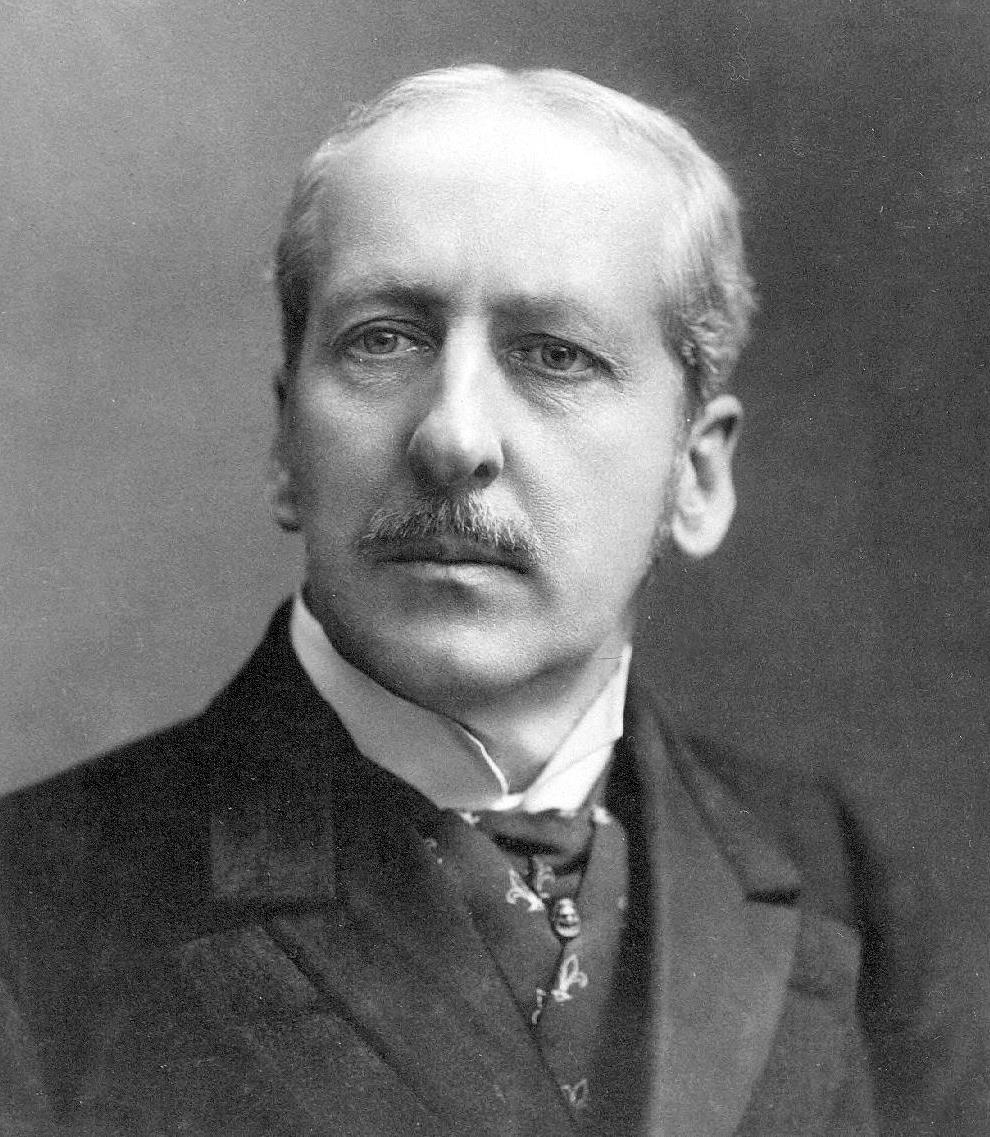
William Pepper

Phoebe Hearst

In 1895, Pepper took steps to investigate the existence of interesting remains near Tarpon Springs, Florida after Lt. Col. Charles Day Durnford reported on them. An expedition was organized, the expense of which was defrayed jointly by Pepper and Hearst. By special agreement with the Bureau of American Ethnology, the expedition was placed under the direction of Cushing, a patient of Pepper's, with the understanding that the Smithsonian Institution should receive duplicates when such were found, and should publish the scientific results of the expedition, to be known as the "Pepper–Hearst Expedition."

== First reconnaissance ==
In May 1895, with two men and a little fishing sloop, Cushing began exploration of the islands and capes of Charlotte Harbor, Pine Island Sound, Caloosa Bay, and the lower more open coast as far as Key Marco, approximately 90 miles (140 km) away to the southward. At Key Marco, Cushing discovered a small, triangular, pond which he named, "Court of the Pile Dwellers". It lay close alongside the sea-wall at the southwestern edge of the key and just below a succession of shell benches, themselves formerly abandoned and filled-up courts of a similar character. The side opposite the seawall, on the east, was formed by an extended ridge – scarcely less high than the sea-wall itself, and likewise composed of well-compacted shells. Around the upper end, and down the outer side of this ridge, led an inlet canal, bordered by similar ridges beyond, and joined by an outlet canal at the lower end – that continued through various low-banked enclosures in the mangrove swamps toward the south, down to the terminus of the seawall itself.

== Organization ==
Upon Cushing's return from the First Reconnaissance, Pepper, with the aid of several of friends and associates, made plans to fit out Cushing, during the following winter, an expedition for the more complete exploration of the region. Jacob Disston volunteered his schooner, the Silver Spray, belonging to a fleet of sponging vessels at Tarpon Springs. Major John Wesley Powell, Director of the Bureau of American Ethnology, provisionally granted leave to Cushing, and promised official recognition and assistance in the conduct of the proposed expedition in the joint interest of the Bureau itself, and of the Department of Archaeology of the University of Pennsylvania. Funds were placed at Cushing's disposal by Pepper in November 1896. Wells M. Sawyer volunteered to be the expedition's artist and photographer while Irving Sayford agreed to be its Field Secretary. Carl F. W. Bergmann, Preparator of Collections in the United States National Museum, also agreed to join the expedition. The Clyde Line Steamship Company furnished passes for the expeditionary members from New York City to Jacksonville; they left Washington on December 4, 1896. Cushing and his wife left overland, and joined the group at Jacksonville from where they proceeded via Sanford, to Tarpon Springs.

== Operations at Key Marco ==
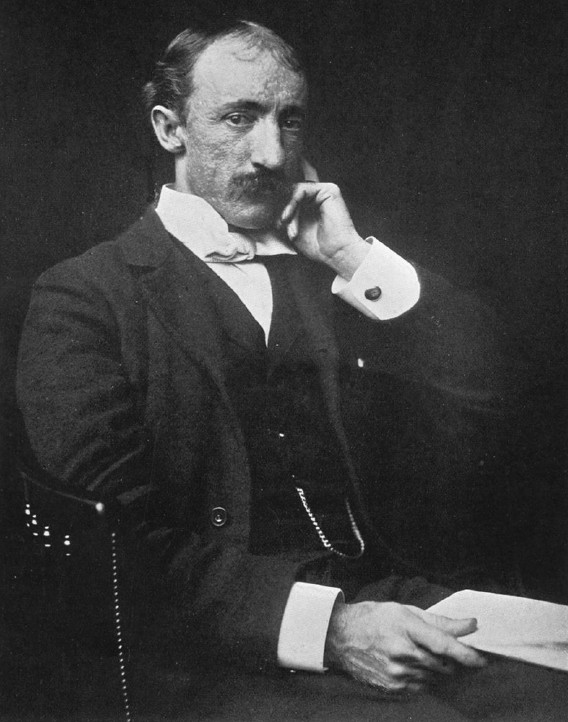
Frank Hamilton Cushing

The Silver Spray set sail in February 1897. In addition to Sawyer, Sayford and Bergmann, Cushing's crew consisted of Antonio Gomez, Sailing Master; Thomas Brady, Mate; Alfred Hudson, Robert Clark and Frank Barnes, Sailors and Excavators; George Gause, Chief Excavator; George Hudson, Cook; and George Dorsett, Steward. Cushing later employed John Calhoun continuously, and other workmen, from time to time, to assist in the excavations. Immediately on arriving at Key Marco, Cushing made arrangements to be permitted to retain all objects discovered, and if desirable, to exploit the little triangular "Court of the Pile Dwellers" from border to border. Three or four of the team worked side by side in each section, digging inch by inch, and foot by foot, horizontally through the muck and rich lower strata, standing or crouching in puddles of mud and water. After the first day's work, Cushing had no doubt as to the unique outcome of the excavations, or as to the desirability of searching through the entire contents of the court. Relics not only of the kind previously discovered, but of new and even more interesting varieties began at once to be found, and continued to be found day after day, throughout the entire five weeks of work in the one locale. Cushing stated, "that never in all my life, despite the sufferings this labor involved, was I so fascinated with or interested in anything so much, as in the finds thus daily revealed".

The objects found in these deposits were in various conditions of preservation, from those which looked fresh and almost new, to those which could be hardly distinguished from the briny peat mire where they were embedded. They consisted of wood, cordage and like perishable materials associated with implements and ornaments of more enduring substances, such as shell, bone and horn. Only a few shaped of stone were encountered during the entire search. Articles of wood far outnumbered all others. Many of these had been painted with black, white, gray-blue, and brownish-red pigments. Unique to archaeology as these things were, Cushing was distressed to feel that even by merely exposing and inspecting them, the expedition was dooming so many of them to destruction, rather than preserving them as permanent examples of primitive art. There were a few groups of utensils, like mortar cups and pestles, and sets of tools; and there were also some bundles or packs of ceremonial objects.

== Archaeological finds ==
The pre–Columbian finds represent collections of a Shell Age phase of human development and culture.

=== Buildings ===
Larger timbers, like the comparatively gigantic sill, which lay along the edge of the northern bench, were absolutely intact. They were excellent examples of primitive joinery. Some of the broad, notched staves—which Cushing judged had been used as symbolic ancestral tablets, probably attached to the gables of houses, or set up in altars—lay on their edges. Flat boards sometimes stood on end, and other long, slender articles, stood slantingly upward, the lowermost ends or edges firmly stuck in the clay-marl of the bottom.

=== Objects ===
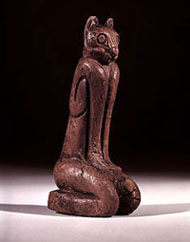
Key Marco Cat, excavated at Key Marco in 1896, on display at the Smithsonian Institution

There were seats made from flat slabs of wood from 1–2 feet (0.30–0.61 m) in length, slightly hollowed on top from end to end as well as from side to side, with rounded bottoms and substantial, prong-like pairs of feet near either end, from 2–3 inches (51–76 mm) long. Some of these stools had the feet level while others were spread and beveled so that they would fit in the hollow bottoms of canoes. Portions of mats, some thick, as though for use as rugs, others enveloping various objects, and others still of shredded bark in strips so thin and flat and closely platted that they might well have served as sails, were frequently discovered, yet none of them could be preserved. It was obvious, however, that the peoples who had inhabited the court understood well, not only platting, but weaving and basketry-making too.

A few examples of pottery were discovered, showing evidence of having been used as cooking bowls or pots. Associated with them were household utensils— spoons made from bivalves, ladles made from the greater halves of hollowed-out well-grown conch shells; and cups, bowls, trays and mortars of wood. Trays were comparatively shallow, oval in outline and varying in length; the ends were narrowed and truncated to form handles, the upper faces of which were usually decorated with neatly cut-in disc-like or semilunar figures or depressions. Atlatls and arrows were found, but no bows. There were a considerable variety of war clubs, as well as dirks made from the foreleg bones of deer. Personal ornaments and paraphernalia, miscellaneous ceremonial appliances, sacred and symbolical objects, carvings and paintings, as well as masks and figureheads were also described among the expedition's finds.

== Aftermath ==
The results,—the discovery, at Key Marco and Demorey Key, of ancient Floridan pile dwellings and of a highly specialized civilization,— created a sensation among Americanists. The original series was arranged and exhibited at the University of Pennsylvania Museum of Archaeology and Anthropology while a duplicate but representative series of the pre–Columbian artifacts 2343 displayed at the National Museum at Washington. Cushing's death occurred before the publication of the memoir.

== Bibliography ==
- Cushing, F. H. (1896). Preliminary Report on the Exploration of Ancient Key-dweller Remains on the Gulf Coast of Florida (Public domain ed.). MacCalla.
- Thorpe, F. N. (1904). William Pepper, M. D., LL. D. (1843–1898): provost of the University of Pennsylvania. J.B. Lippincott company. p. 447.
- Widmer, R. J. (2000). Introduction. Exploration of Ancient Key-dweller Remains on the Gulf Coast of Florida. By Cushing, F. H. University Press of Florida. ISBN 9780813017914.
