= George David Yater =

American painter (1910–1993)

- Born: November 30, 1910; Madison, Indiana, US
- Died: April 15, 1993 (aged 82); Truro, Massachusetts, US
- Known for: Painting

George David Yater (November 30, 1910 – April 15, 1993) was an American painter associated with the Cape Cod School of Art, and most well known for his watercolors.

== Family life ==
Yater was born on November 30, 1910, in Madison, Indiana, to James and Flora May Yater (née Price). One of four children, his father was an electrician. He married Shirley Pell in 1939. The couple had one son, David Pell Yater, born 1942, and one daughter, Marjorie Ellen Yater, born 1948. He is buried, alongside his wife, in the Snow Cemetery, in Truro, Massachusetts.

== Art career ==
Yater graduated in 1928 from Madison High School, in Madison, Indiana, and received a scholarship to attend the John Herron Art School in Indianapolis, Indiana. He remained there four years and studied with William Forsythe. At the John Herron Art School, Yater receive a $150 scholarship for winter studies in 1930. From 1931 through 1934, Yater studied each summer at the Cape School of Art with Henry Hensche, receiving full tuition scholarships for each of the four summer terms. From 1934 to 1939, Yater continued painting in Provincetown at the Euler Studios, supporting himself with odd jobs. His first one-man show of watercolors came at the Babcock Galleries, in New York City, in 1936. He exhibited 20 paintings but sold none at this show. In 1938, he was employed by the WPA, receiving from the federal program $17.40 for 12 hours of painter per week. He had his second one-man show at Babcock Galleries in 1938.

From 1947 until 1961, Yater served as Director of the Provincetown Art Association.

Between 1952 and 1960, Yater illustrated numerous articles for the Ford Times Magazine.

In 1955 and 1956, Yater was the executive director of the Sarasota Art Association, now called the Art Center Sarasota.

In 1970 and 1971, Yater was the Director of the Middletown Fine Arts Center in Middletown, Ohio.

In 1972 and 1973, Yater was an instructor and advisor at Castle Hill, Truro Center for the Arts in Truro, Massachusetts.

Yater is listed in Who Was Who in Art, Who's Who in Massachusetts, Who's Who in New England and Archives of American Art, Smithsonian Institution.

== Exhibitions ==
- 1930—Indiana Artist Annual, John Herron Art Museum and Indianapolis Art Museum, Indianapolis.
- 1931—Hoosier Salon, Chicago. $100 prize for best pastel, for a work title "Portrait".
- 1931—Indiana Artist Annual, John Herron Art Museum and Indianapolis Art Museum, Indianapolis.
- 1932—Pennsylvania Academy of Fine Arts, Philadelphia.
- 1932—Hoosier Salon, Chicago. Exhibited "Class Study, Provincetown".
- 1932—Indiana Artist Annual, John Herron Art Museum and Indianapolis Art Museum, Indianapolis.
- 1934—Indiana Artist Annual, John Herron Art Museum and Indianapolis Art Museum, Indianapolis.
- 1934—Pennsylvania Academy of Fine Arts, Philadelphia.
- 1935—Indiana Artist Annual, John Herron Art Museum and Indianapolis Art Museum, Indianapolis.
- 1936—Indiana Artist Annual, John Herron Art Museum and Indianapolis Art Museum, Indianapolis.
- 1937—American Water Color Society.
- 1937—Pennsylvania Academy of Fine Arts, Philadelphia.
- 1937—Indiana Artist Annual, John Herron Art Museum and Indianapolis Art Museum, Indianapolis.
- 1938—American Water Color Society.
- 1938—Indiana Artist Annual, John Herron Art Museum and Indianapolis Art Museum, Indianapolis.
- 1939—New York World's Fair.
- 1939—Pennsylvania Academy of Fine Arts, Philadelphia.
- 1939—Indiana Artist Annual, John Herron Art Museum and Indianapolis Art Museum, Indianapolis.
- 1940—Hoosier Salon, Chicago.
- 1940—Indiana Artist Annual, John Herron Art Museum and Indianapolis Art Museum, Indianapolis.
- 1941—Hoosier Salon, Chicago and Indianapolis.
- 1941—Indiana Artist Annual, John Herron Art Museum and Indianapolis Art Museum, Indianapolis.
- 1943—Lyme Art Association, Old Lyme, Connecticut.
- 1943—Pennsylvania Academy of Fine Arts, Philadelphia.
- 1944—Lyme Art Association, Old Lyme, Connecticut.
- 1944—Pennsylvania Academy of Fine Arts, Philadelphia.
- 1945—American Water Color Society.
- 1945—Pennsylvania Academy of Fine Arts, Philadelphia.
- 1945—Indiana Artist Annual, John Herron Art Museum and Indianapolis Art Museum, Indianapolis.
- 1945—Lyme Art Association, Old Lyme, Connecticut.
- 1946—Hoosier Salon, Chicago.
- 1946—Indiana Artist Annual, John Herron Art Museum and Indianapolis Art Museum, Indianapolis.
- 1947—Pennsylvania Academy of Fine Arts, Philadelphia.
- 1955—Sarasota Art Association, Sarasota, Florida.
- 1956—Sarasota Art Association, Sarasota, Florida.
- 1956—Hoosier Salon, Indianapolis, Indiana.
- 1972—Moire Gallery, Caldwell, New Jersey.
- 1973—Moire Gallery, Caldwell, New Jersey.
- 1974—Left Bank Gallery, Wellfleet, Massachusetts.
- 1982—Provincetown Art Association and Museum, Provincetown, Massachusetts.
- 1986—Cape Museum of Fine Arts, Dennis, Massachusetts.
- 1991—Provincetown Heritage Museum, Provincetown, Massachusetts.
