= Frank Hamilton Cushing =

American anthropologist and ethnologist

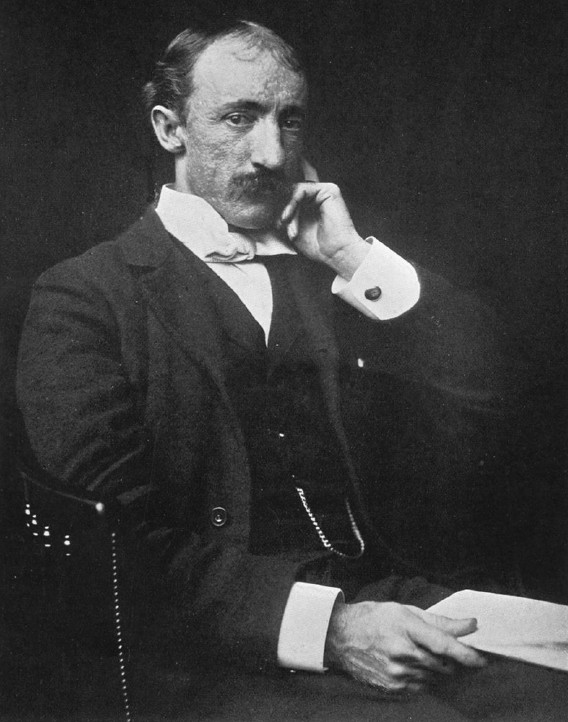
Frank Hamilton Cushing

Frank Hamilton Cushing (July 22, 1857 in North East Township, Erie County, Pennsylvania – April 10, 1900 in Washington, D.C.) was an American anthropologist and ethnologist who made pioneering studies of the Zuni Indians of New Mexico by entering into their culture; his work helped establish participant observation as a common anthropological research strategy. In recent years, however, questions have emerged about Cushing's activities among the Zuni. Consequently, Frank Cushing's work provides an important case study for considering the ethics of both ethnographic research and the generation of museum collections.

== Early life ==
Cushing was born in the borough of North East, Pennsylvania. He later moved with his family to Western New York. As a boy he took an interest in the Native American artifacts in the surrounding countryside and taught himself how to knap flint (make arrowheads and such from flint). He published his first scientific paper when he was 17.

After a brief period at Cornell University, where he curated an exhibit of Indian artifacts, Cushing attracted notice from the director of the Smithsonian Institution. At 19 Cushing was appointed curator of the ethnological department of the National Museum in Washington, D.C. There he came to the attention of John Wesley Powell, of the Bureau of Ethnology.

== Work at Zuni ==
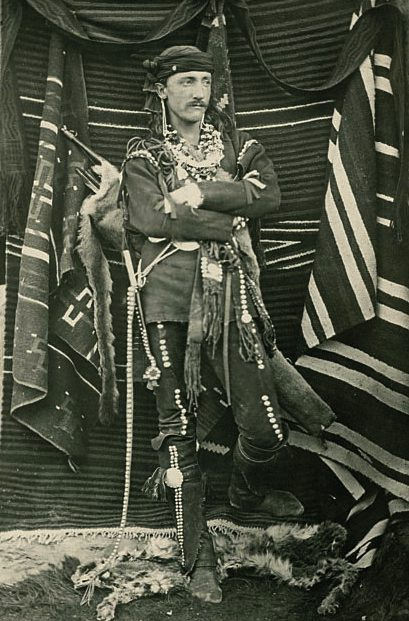
Cushing at Zuni, c. 1881-82., by John K. Hillers

Cushing was invited by Powell to join the James Stevenson anthropological expedition to New Mexico. The group traveled by rail to the end of the line at Las Vegas, New Mexico, then on to Zuni Pueblo. Fascinated by this culture, Cushing gained permission to stay at the pueblo. He "went native", living with the Zuni from 1879 to 1884, and becoming anthropology's first participant observer. This technique has often been attributed to Bronisław Malinowski, but he did not work with the Trobriand Islanders until more than 30 years following Cushing's lengthy stay at Zuni.

After some initial difficulties, Cushing was generally accepted by the community. He was adopted by the Governor of the Pueblo, Patrico Pino (Ba:lawahdiwa), he was given a Zuni name, "Tenatsali", meaning "medicine flower", and he was allowed to participate in Zuni activities. In 1881, Cushing was initiated into the warrior society, the Priesthood of the Bow. Yet, there were always factions who disliked and distrusted Cushing. At least once, members of the Zuni community considered killing him as they believed he was after their sacred secrets. Despite his later success and quasi-acceptance, the same charge frequently brought him close to local definitions of witchcraft, a serious violation of Zuni norms.

Cushing often recounted Zuni folk tales and legends. In 1882 he took his Zuni father, Pedro Pino (Lai-iu-ah-tsai-lu), and fellow Bow members on a tour to the Eastern United States to show them his culture. Their journey attracted considerable press attention, as there was great interest in American Indians of the West. Cushing considered the tour part of what he called "the reciprocal method." He introduced his anthropological subjects to his own culture, just as they had introduced him to theirs (Green 1990:166). He was a century ahead of other practitioners of this process, now called "reflexive anthropology".

During this tour, Cushing married Emily Tennison of Washington, D.C. His wife and her sister returned with him and his party to Zuni.

Cushing became embroiled in political intrigue after President Rutherford B. Hayes in 1877 signed a bill designating the boundaries of the new Zuni reservation. One 800-acre (3.2 km^{2}) section of Zuni territory, called the Nutria Valley, had been left out. Three land speculators, including Major W. F. Tucker, arrived in Zuni in late 1882 to claim the parcel for a cattle ranching operation. The angered Zuni appealed to Cushing for help, and he wrote letters to newspapers in Chicago and Boston in their defense. Major Tucker's father-in-law was US Senator John A. Logan from Illinois, who was influential in the Republican Party and would become a vice presidential candidate in 1884. Although the administration of President Chester A. Arthur redefined the Zuni boundaries in 1883 to correct the Nutria Valley omission, the damage to Cushing's position had been done.

Senator Logan resented his reputation being tarnished in the "land grab" imbroglio. As U.S. Senator, he threatened director John Wesley Powell of the Bureau of American Ethnology with funding cuts if Cushing's stay in Zuni was not terminated. Cushing was forced to return to Washington, ending his landmark efforts among the New Mexico natives.

Cushing returned to Zuni briefly in 1886 as leader of the Hemenway Southwestern Archaeological Expedition. He was forced from this position by personal and health problems. In 1889 he was succeeded as leader by ethnologist J. Walter Fewkes, who had little field experience.

== Professional Controversy ==
Among the forces driving the growth of the Smithsonian Institution at the end of the 19th century was John Wesley Powell's belief in the need to document Native American life and to collect Indian materials before the Westward expansion of the United States caused both to disappear. This conviction accounted for the urgency with which the Stevenson expedition, including the inexperienced Frank Cushing, was dispatched to Zuni pueblo in 1879. It is no coincidence that numerous Zuni artifacts, including many sacred objects (some considered living beings by the Zuni), began to be shipped to Washington the same year. By its heyday, the Zuni collection of the Smithsonian's Museum of Natural History included some 10,000 pieces, the earliest of which were acquired by the members of the Stevenson expedition. Many (if not most) of these artifacts were collected through less-than-honest means, sometimes including outright theft, and often against the express wishes of Zuni elders and traditionalists.

The Zuni tried Cushing, himself, for stealing sacred artifacts. While he managed to survive his trial, it is certain that Cushing, like other members of the Stevenson expedition and later anthropologists, removed sacred items from the Zuni pueblo. Some of these artifacts joined the Smithsonian collection; others found themselves further afield, in the collections of museums as far away as Germany and the UK.

== Later years ==
Because of Cushing's work at Zuni, in 1882 Powell assigned the anthropologist to an expedition to the Hopi village of Oraibi. His mission was to council with Oraibi's chiefs and get permission to trade goods for a collection of artifacts and crafts for the Smithsonian expedition. The Oraibi Governor approved the visit and trade, but the ultra-conservative Oraibi Traditionalists held special council and refused to trade. The expedition was forced to leave without trading.

Cushing worked with Tichkematse (Cheyenne), who worked at the Smithsonian, to document Plains Indian Sign Language.

Cushing led the Pepper-Hearst Expedition at Key Marco (1895–1897) and studied abandoned villages in the American West. He came into contact with Stewart Culin on the World's Columbian Exposition and began to work with him to write about the history of games and their role in culture.

Cushing was elected to the American Philosophical Society in 1896.

Cushing died suddenly. While on a research project in Maine, he choked on a fishbone. Subsequent hemorrhaging in his throat led to his death on April 10, 1900. He was only 42. Some Zuni have understood Cushing's unfortunate and untimely death as spiritual retribution for his handling of secret information and his pilfering of sacred objects.

== Significance of work ==
Cushing was an innovator in the development of the anthropological view that all peoples have a culture from which they draw. He was ahead of his time as the first participant observer who entered into and participated in another culture, rather than studying and commenting on it as an outside observer. At the same time, Cushing's work also presents a series of ethical dilemmas that must be considered in tracing anthropology's relationship to Indigenous people.

The noted artist Thomas Eakins painted him in Zuni costume. John K. Hillers took photographs at Zuni, some showing Cushing as a Bow Priest.

== Cushing's books on Zuni ==
- Jesse Green, Sharon Weiner Green and Frank Hamilton Cushing, Cushing at Zuni: The Correspondence and Journals of Frank Hamilton Cushing, 1879-1884, UNMPRESS University of New Mexico Press, 1990, hardcover ISBN 0-8263-1172-5
- Sylvester Baxter and Frank H. Cushing, My Adventurers in Zuni: Including Father of The Pueblos & An Aboriginal Pilgrimage, PMA Online Org Filter Press, LLC, 1999, paperback, 1999, 79 pages, ISBN 0-86541-045-3
- Frank H. Cushing, My Adventures in Zuni, Pamphlet, ISBN 1-121-39551-1
- Frank Hamilton Cushing and Barton Wright, The Mythic World of the Zuni, University of New Mexico Press, 1992, hardcover, ISBN 0-8263-1036-2
- Frank H. Cushing, Outlines of Zuni Creation Myths, AMS Press; Reprint edition (June 1, 1996), Hardcover, ISBN 0-404-11834-8
- Frank H. Cushing, Zuni Coyote Tales, University of Arizona Press, 1998, paperback, 104 pages, ISBN 0-8165-1892-0
- Frank Hamilton Cushing, Zuni Fetishes, pamphlet, ISBN 1-199-17971-X and ISBN 1-122-26704-5
- Frank H. Cushing, designed by K. C. DenDooven, photographed by Bruce Hucko, Annotations by Mark Bahti, Zuni Fetishes, KC Publications, 1999, paperback, 48 pages, ISBN 0-88714-144-7
- Frank Hamilton Cushing, Zuni Fetishes Facsimile, pamphlet, ISBN 1-125-28500-1
- Frank Hamilton Cushing, Zuni Folk Tales, hardcover, ISBN 1-125-91410-6
- Frank Hamilton Cushing, Zuni Folk Tales, University of Arizona Press, 1999, trade paperback, ISBN 0-8165-0986-7
- Frank H. Cushing, edited by Jesse Green, foreword by Fred Eggan, Introduction by Jesse Green, Zuni: Selected Writings of Frank Hamilton Cushing University of Nebraska Press, 1978, hardcover, 440 pages, ISBN 0-8032-2100-2; trade paperback, 1979, 449 pages, ISBN 0-8032-7007-0
- Frank Hamilton Cushing. Zuni Breadstuff (Indian Notes and Monographs V.8), AMS Press, 1975, 673 pages, ISBN 0-404-11835-6

== Other works by Cushing ==
- Preliminary Report on the Exploration of Ancient Key-dweller Remains on the Gulf Coast of Florida. MacCalla. 1896. Republished as Exploration of Ancient Key-Dweller Remains on the Gulf Coast of Florida, University Press of Florida, 2000, ISBN 9780813017914.
- The Florida Journals of Frank Hamilton Cushing, edited by Phyllis Kolianos and Brent Weisman. University of Florida Press, 2005, ISBN 9780813028040.
- The Lost Florida Manuscript of Frank Hamilton Cushing, edited by Phyllis Kolianos and Brent Weisman. University of Florida Press, 2005, ISBN 9780813028033.
