= Jerry Farnsworth =

American painter

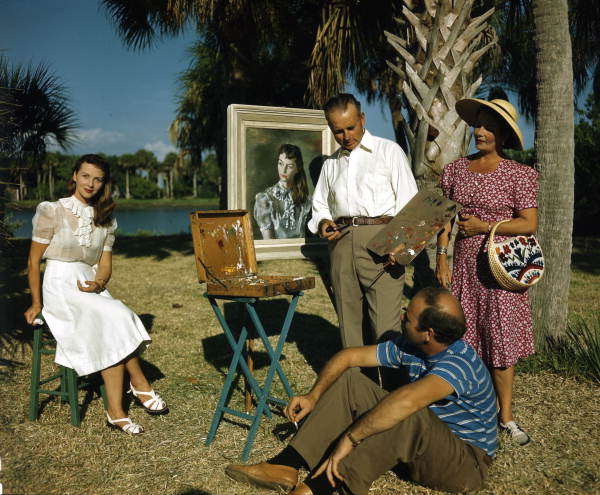
Photograph of Farnsworth painting a portrait of a woman in Sarasota, Florida, 1947

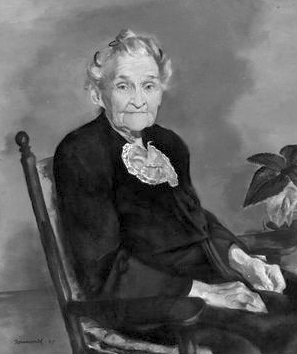
Painting of Martha Truman

Jerry Farnsworth (1895–1983) was an American artist. He was born in Dalton, Georgia and studied at the Corcoran School of Art under Charles W. Hawthorne. During 1942 and 1943 he was the Artist-in-Residence at the University of Illinois. Farnsworth also worked in a soda dispensing drug store, as a Fuller Brush Man, as a Western Union messenger boy, and in a cotton mill and steel mill.

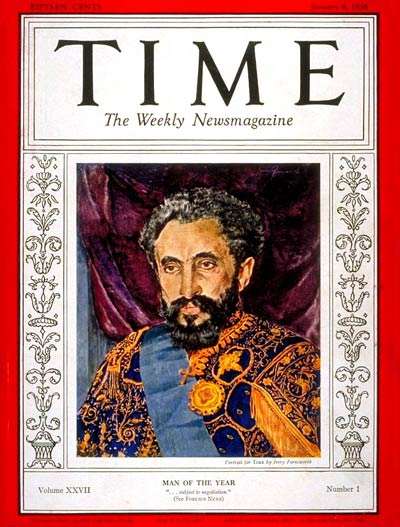
Farnsworth's 1936 Time magazine cover painting of Haile Selassie

Farnsworth's awards include six from the National Academy of Design (1941), one from the National Arts Club (1941), one from the Los Angeles County Museum of Art (1945) and one from Grand Central Galleries (1928). Farnsworth belonged to the National Arts Club, an Academician of the National Academy of Design, the Salmagundi Club, Washington Society of Art and the Provincetown Art Association. Painter Helen Alton Sawyer was his wife and they operated a summer art school in Truro, Massachusetts. They wintered in Sarasota, Florida.

His work was exhibited at the Pennsylvania Academy of Fine Arts, the Museum of Modern Art and the Whitney Museum of American Art.

He wrote Painting with Jerry Farnsworth, Learning to Paint in Oil and Portrait and Figure Painting. Some of his papers are collected at Syracuse University.

He married fellow artist Helen Alton Sawyer (1900-1999).
