= Indigenous people of the Everglades region =

Peoples of the Florida Everglades

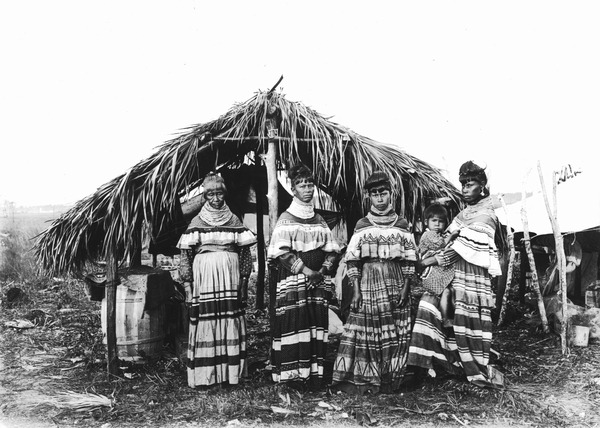
The Seminole family of Cypress Tiger in 1916

The Indigenous people of the Everglades region arrived in the Florida peninsula of what is now the United States approximately 15,000 years ago, probably following large game. These Paleo-Indians found an arid landscape that supported plants and animals adapted to prairie and xeric scrub conditions. Large animals became extinct in Florida around 11,000 years ago. Climate changes 6,500 years ago brought a wetter landscape across much of eastern North America. Approximately 5,000 years ago, the climate shifted again to cause the regular flooding from Lake Okeechobee that became the Everglades ecosystems. Paleo-Indians across the continent adapted to the new conditions and became more sedentary, with the timing of the transition varying by region. Archaeologists call these cultures Archaic peoples, with the archaeological culture of the eastern side of the peninsula dubbed the Orange period. Groups became more specialized for their local environments than their ancestors, and created many tools and mounds with the resources they had.

From the Archaic peoples of the peninsula, two major tribes emerged in the area: the Calusa and the Tequesta. The earliest written descriptions of these people come from Spanish explorers who sought to convert and conquer them. Although they lived in complex societies, few traces of their existence remain today. The Calusa were more powerful in number and political structure. Their territory was centered around modern-day Fort Myers, and extended as far north as Tampa, as far east as Lake Okeechobee, and as far south as the Keys. The Tequesta lived on the southeastern coast of the Florida peninsula around what is today Biscayne Bay and the Miami River. Both societies were well-adapted to live in the various ecosystems of the Everglades regions. They often traveled through the heart of the Everglades, though they rarely lived within it.

After more than 210 years of relations with the Spanish, both Indigenous societies lost cohesiveness. Official records indicate that survivors of war and disease were transported to Havana in the late 18th century. Isolated groups may have been assimilated into the Seminole, which formed in northern Florida when a band of Muscogee consolidated surviving members of precontact societies in Florida into their own to become a distinct tribe. Seminoles were forced into the Everglades by the U.S. military during the Seminole Wars from 1835 to 1842. The U.S. Army pursued the Seminoles into the region, which resulted in some of the first recorded explorations of much of the area. Seminoles continue to live in the Everglades region, and support themselves with casino gaming on six reservations located throughout the state.

== Earliest peoples ==
Cultural Periods in Precontact South Florida
Period	Dates
Paleo-Indian	10,000–7,000 BCE
Archaic: Early; Middle; Late	7,000–5,000 BCE; 5,000–3,000 BCE; 3,000–1,500 BCE
Transitional	1,500–500 BCE
Glades I	500 BCE–800 CE
Glades II	800–1200
Glades III	1200–1566
Historic	1566–1763

Humans first inhabited the peninsula of Florida approximately 15,000 years ago when it looked vastly different. The west coast extended about 100 miles (160 km) to the west of its current location. The landscape had large dunes and sweeping winds characteristic of an arid region, and pollen samples show foliage was limited to small stands of oak, and scrub bushes. As earth's glacial ice retreated, winds slowed and vegetation became more prevalent and varied. Archaeologists have found direct evidence that Paleoindians in Florida hunted mammoths, mastodons, Bison antiquus, and giant tortoises. The bones of other large and small animals, including ground sloths, tapirs, horses, camelids, deer, fish, turtles, shellfish, snakes, raccoons, opossums, and muskrats are associated with Paleoindian sites. Around 6,500 years ago, the climate of Florida began to change, and the land became much wetter. Paleo-Indians spent more time in camps and less time traveling in between sources of water.

The Paleo-Indians then slowly adapted and became the Archaic peoples of the Florida peninsula, most probably due to the extinction of big game. Archaic people were primarily hunter-gatherers who depended on smaller game and fish, and relied more than their predecessors on plants for food. They were able to adapt to the shifting climate and the resulting change of animal and plant populations. Florida experienced a prolonged drought at the onset of the Early Archaic era that lasted until the Middle Archaic period. Although the population decreased overall on the peninsula, the use of tools increased significantly during this time; artifacts have shown that these people used drills, knives, choppers, atlatls, and awls made from stone, antlers, and bone.

Southern Florida became very dry during the early Archaic, from 9000 to 7000 BCE. Known Paleo-Indian sites were abandoned During that time, and the population in the region was very sparse, if any. Starting in the Middle Archaic, around 6500 BCE, Florida became wetter, but southern Florida remained relatively dry. Lake Okeechobee had not formed, and with almost no surface runoff, there were no brackish estuaries along the coasts. During the Late Archaic period, the climate continued getting wetter, and by approximately 3000 BCE, the water table had risen. Pre-creamic archaeological sites from this period have been found near the coasts and in the Big Cypress Swamp, but there is no certain evidence of human presence in the Everglades proper, which was still developing and had not reached its pre-drainange (prior to 1905) extent.

== Pottery ==
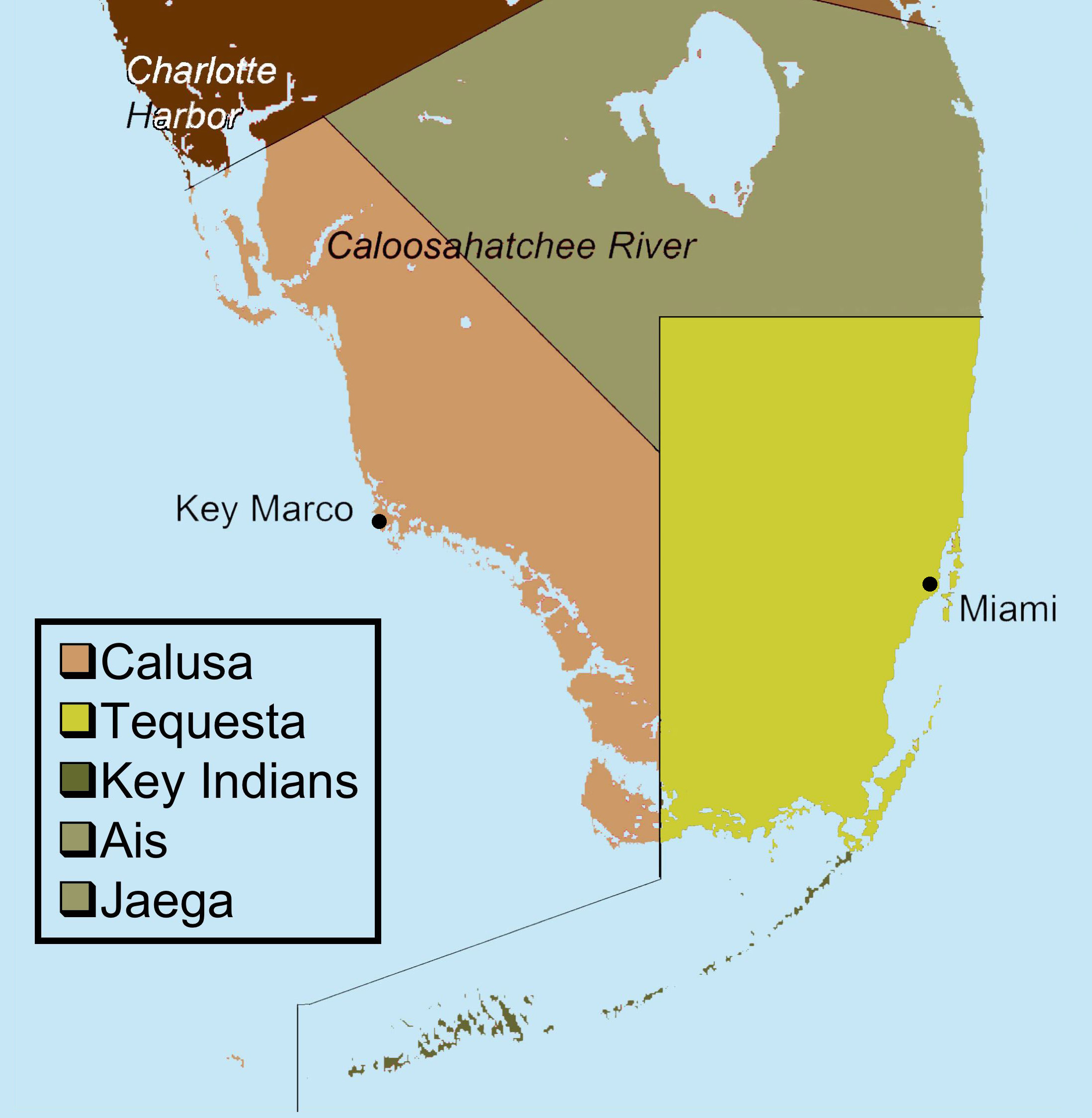
Archaeological subareas in and around the Everglades

Fiber-tempered pottery of the Orange series appeared in northern Florida around 2000 or 1500 BCE. Late Orange series pottery shifted to a semi-fiber-tempered type, in which both fiber and sand were used as temper. Semi-fiber-tempered pottery began appearing in southern Florida sites at the end of the late Archaic. As the Archaic ended coastal estuaries became increasingly productive, leading to a cultural adaptation that primarily harvested food sources from coastal waters, with hunting of land animals and gathering of wild plants secondary.

Pottery making in southern Florida had shifted to using sand as tempering at the end of the Archaic (between 1000 and 500 BCE in southern Florida). Based primarily on differences in pottery styles, archaeologists have defined three cultures for the post-Archaic period for the region; the Belle Glade (or Okeechobee) culture, the Caloosahatchee culture, and the Glades culture. The Caloosahatchee culture area, which was inhabited by the Calusa people at the time of European contact, is not part of the Everglades. The Belle Glade culture area surrounds Lake Okeechobee, and includes the northern part of the Everglades, as well as the lower Kissimmee River valley. The Mayaimi people lived in that region at the time of European contact. The remainder of southern Florida, including the middle and lower Everglades, the Big Cypress Swamp, the Atlantic coast of Florida from what is now Martin County south to and including the Florida Keys, the Ten Thousand Islands, and the Gulf of Mexico coast north to just south of Estero Bay, are in the Glades culture area.

The Glades culture is divided into three periods based on evidence found in middens. In 1947, archaeologist John Goggin described the three periods after examining shell mounds. He excavated one on Matecumbe Key, another at Gordon Pass near modern-day Naples, and a third south of Lake Okeechobee near modern-day Belle Glade. The Glades I culture, lasting from 500 BCE to 800 CE, was apparently focused around Gordon Pass and is considered the least sophisticated due to the lack of artifacts. What has been found—primarily pottery—is gritty and plain. With the advent of a well-established culture in 800 CE, the Glades II period is characterized by more ornate pottery, wide use of tools throughout the South Florida region, and the appearance of religious artifacts at burial sites. By 1200, the Glades III culture exhibited the height of their development. Pottery became ornate enough to be subdivided into types of decoration. More importantly, evidence of an expanding culture is revealed through the development of ceremonial ornaments made from shell, and the construction of large earthworks associated with burial rituals. From the Glades III culture developed two distinct tribes that lived in and near the Everglades: the Calusa and the Tequesta.

== Mounds ==
The cultures of southern Florida shared many features. One difference is in the construction and use of mounds. Many sites in the Belle Glade culture area, such as Fort Center, have elaborate earthworks consisting of mounds, ponds, borrow pits, ditches, canals, and embankments, often arranged in geometric shapes. Sites in the Caloosahatchee culture area include many structures, primarily of shell. Aside from large middens, constructed structures include platform mounds, causeways, and canals such as the Pine Island Canal. Many sites in the culture area, such as Mound Key and the Pineland site, developed into Shell works, elaborate constructions of shell consisting of some combination of mounds, borrow pits, canals, causeways, cisterns, crescents, sunken plazas, ponds, ramps, raised platforms, ridges, rings, walls, and "water courts".

Shell works, including large ones such as Dismal Key, Key Marco, and the Turner River Site, have been found in the Ten Thousand Island District of the Glades culture area, as well as many smaller, less elaborate Shell rings. On the other hand, Bob Carr has commented that "there are few constructed mounds in southern Florida". Constructed mounds in southeast Florida, the part of the Glades culture area along the Atlantic coast, were made of sand or limestone rock. Coastal transport of sand along the coast ends at Biscayne Bay, and there is little sand available south of the Miami River. Mounds between there and the Florida Keys were built with loose limestone rocks. A couple of possible circular ditches with a clear center, similar to ones at Fort Center and other Belle Glade sites, have been identified in Miami-Dade County.

== First contact ==
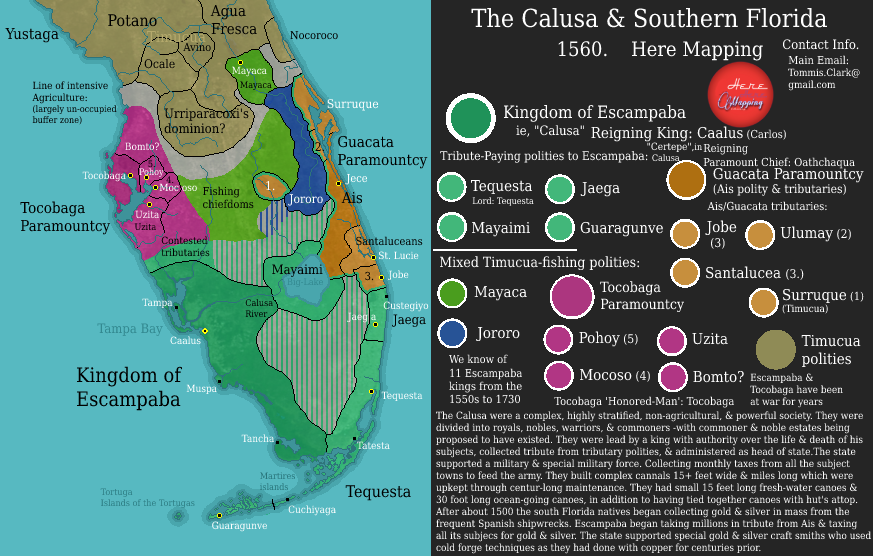
A colored map showing the polities in the lower half of the Florida peninsula in 1560

The first known Europeans to meet the indigenous peoples of southern Florida were Juan Ponce de León and his crew in 1513, when they reached Biscayne Bay and visited the site of the main Tequesta town at the mouth of the Miami River. The Tequesta people retreated from their town when the Spanish approached. Ponce de León's fleet then sailed along the Florida Keys and up to the southwest coast of Florida, anchoring somewhere in the Calusa domain in order to take on firewood and fresh water. Over a three week period there were skirmishes between the Spanish and the Calusa, with casualties on both sides. The Spanish captured captured several Calusa men and women. One Calusa man could speak some Spanish, indicating some kind of earlier contact.

== Calusa ==
What is known of the inhabitants of Florida after 1566 was recorded by European explorers and settlers. Juan Ponce de León is credited as the first European to have contact with Florida's Indigenous people in 1513. Ponce de León met with hostility from tribes that may have been the Ais and the Tequesta before rounding Cape Sable to meet the Calusa, the largest and most powerful tribe in South Florida. Ponce de León found at least one of the Calusa fluent in Spanish. The explorer assumed the Spanish-speaker was from Hispaniola, but anthropologists have suggested that communication and trade between Calusa and native people in Cuba and the Florida Keys was common, or that Ponce de León was not the first Spaniard to make contact with the native people of Florida. During his second visit to South Florida, Ponce de León was killed by the Calusa, and the tribe gained a reputation for violence, causing future explorers to avoid them. In the more than 200 years the Calusa had relations with the Spanish, they were able to resist their attempts to missionize them.

The Calusa were referred to as Carlos by the Spanish, which may have sounded like Calos, a variation of the Muskogean word kalo meaning "black" or "powerful". Much of what is known about the Calusa was provided by Hernando de Escalante Fontaneda. Fontaneda was a 13-year-old boy who was the only survivor of a shipwreck off the coast of Florida in 1545. For seventeen years he lived with the Calusa until explorer Pedro Menéndez de Avilés found him in 1566. Menéndez took Fontaneda to Spain where he wrote about his experiences. Menéndez approached the Calusa with the intention of establishing relations with them to ease the settlement of the future Spanish colony. The chief, or cacique, was named Carlos by the Spanish. Positions of importance in Calusa society were given the adopted names Carlos and Philip, transliterated from Spanish royal tradition. However, the cacique Carlos described by Fontaneda was the most powerful chief during Spanish colonization. Menéndez married his sister in order to facilitate relations between the Spanish and the Calusa. This arrangement was common in societies in South Florida people. Polygamy was a method of solving disputes or settling agreements between rival towns. Menéndez, however, was already married and expressed discomfort with the union. Unable to avoid the marriage, he took Carlos' sister to Havana where she was educated, and where one account reported that she died years later, the marriage never consummated.

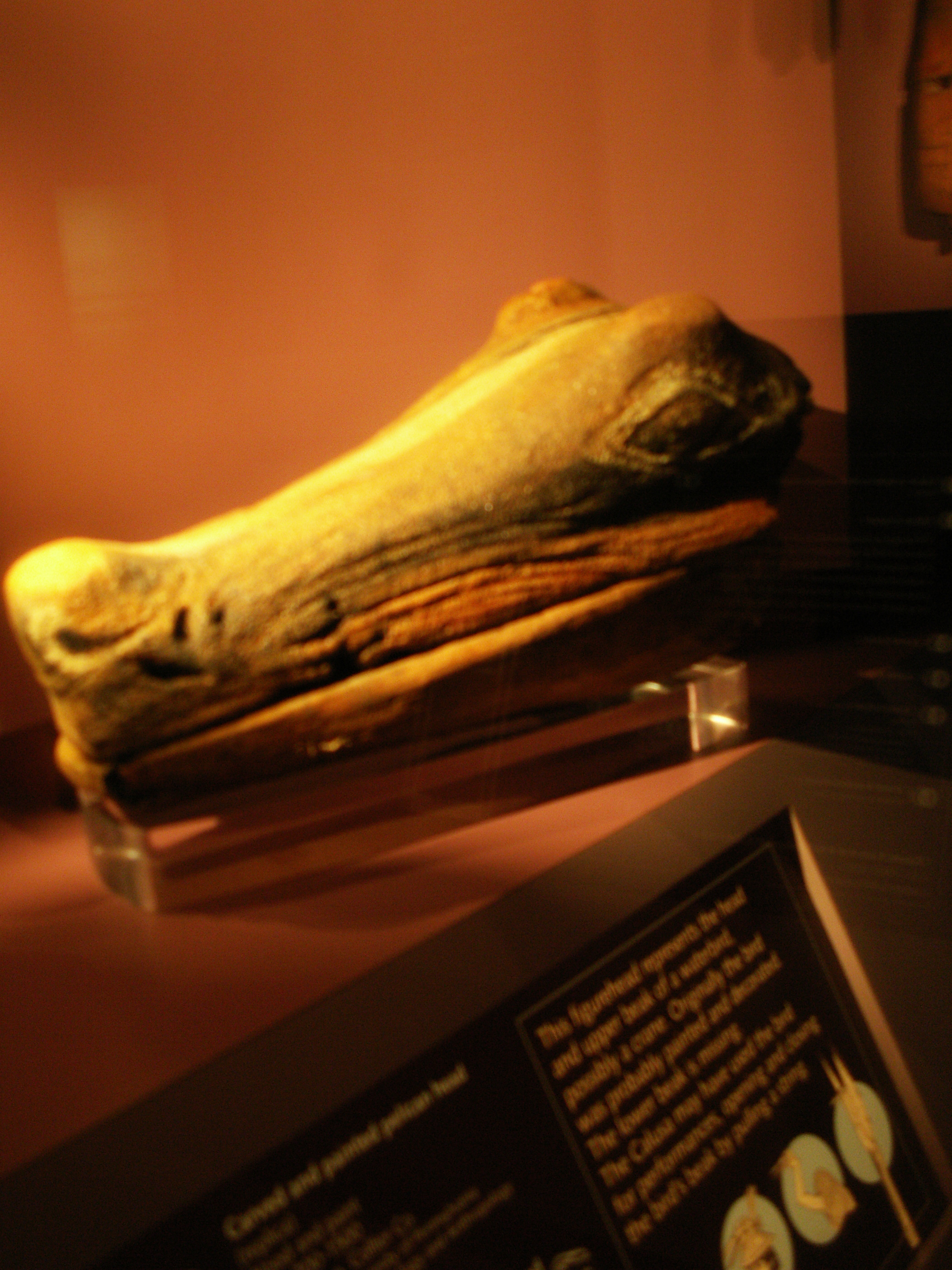
A Calusa wood carving of an alligator head excavated in Key Marco in 1895, on display at the Florida Museum of Natural History

Fontaneda explained in his 1571 memoir that Carlos controlled fifty villages located on Florida's west coast, around Lake Okeechobee (which they called Mayaimi) and on the Florida Keys (they called Martires). Smaller tribes of Ais and Jaega who lived to the east of Lake Okeechobee, paid regular tributes to Carlos. The Spanish suspected the Calusa of harvesting treasures from shipwrecks and distributing the gold and silver between the Ais and Jaega, with Carlos receiving the majority. The main village of the Calusa, and home of Carlos, bordered Estero Bay at present-day Mound Key where the Caloosahatchee River meets the Gulf of Mexico. Fontaneda described human sacrifice as a common practice: when the child of a cacique died, each resident gave up a child to be sacrificed, and when the cacique died, his servants were sacrificed to join him. Each year a Christian was required to be sacrificed to appease a Calusa idol. The building of shell mounds of varying sizes and shapes was also of spiritual significance to the Calusa. In 1895 Frank Hamilton Cushing excavated a massive shell mound on Key Marco that was composed of several constructed terraces hundreds of yards long. Cushing unearthed over a thousand Calusa artifacts. Among them he found tools made of bone and shell, pottery, human bones, masks, and animal carvings made of wood.

The Calusa, like their predecessors, were hunter-gatherers who existed on small game, fish, turtles, alligators, shellfish, and various plants. Finding little use for the soft limestone of the area, they made most of their tools from bone or teeth, although they also found sharpened reeds effective. Weapons consisted of bows and arrows, atlatls, and spears. Most villages were located at the mouths of rivers or on key islands. Canoes were used for transportation, as evidenced by shell mounds in and around the Everglades that border canoe trails. South Florida tribes often canoed through the Everglades, but rarely lived in them. Canoe trips to Cuba were also common.

Calusa villages often had more than 200 inhabitants, and their society was organized in a hierarchy. Apart from the cacique, other strata included priests and warriors. Family bonds promoted the hierarchy, and marriage between siblings was common among the elite. Fontaneda wrote, "These Indians have no gold, no silver, and less clothing. They go naked except for some breech cloths woven of palms, with which the men cover themselves; the women do the like with certain grass that grows on trees. This grass looks like wool, although it is different from it". Only one instance of structures was described: Carlos met Menéndez in a large house with windows and room for over a thousand people.

The Spanish found Carlos uncontrollable, as their priests and the Calusa fought almost constantly. Carlos was killed when a Spanish soldier shot him with a crossbow. Following the death of cacique Carlos, leadership of the society passed to two caciques who were captured and killed by the Spanish. Estimated numbers of Calusa at the beginning of the occupation of the Spanish ranged from 4,000 to 7,000. The society endured a decline of power and population after Carlos; by 1697 their number was estimated to be about 1,000. By the early 1700s, warfare, slaving raids, and epidemics reduced South Florida populations; survivors relocated to missions near Havana or merged with refugee groups. In the early 18th century, the Calusa came under attack from the Yamasee to the north; many asked to be removed to Cuba, where almost 200 died of illness. Some relocated to Florida, and remnants may have been eventually assimilated into the Seminole culture, which developed during the 18th century.

== Tequesta ==
Second in power and number to the Calusa in South Florida were the Tequesta (also called Tekesta, Tequeste, and Tegesta). They occupied the southeastern portion of the lower peninsula in modern-day Dade and Broward counties. They may have been controlled by the Calusa, but accounts state that they sometimes refused to comply with the Calusa caciques, which resulted in war. Like the Calusa, they rarely lived within the Everglades, but found the coastal prairies and pine rocklands to the east of the freshwater sloughs habitable. To the north, their territory was bordered by the Ais and Jaega. Like the Calusa, the Tequesta societies centered around the mouths of rivers. Their main village was probably on the Miami River or Little River. A large shell mound on the Little River marks where a village once stood. Though little remains of the Tequesta society, a site of archeological importance called the Miami Circle was discovered in 1998 in downtown Miami. It may be the remains of a Tequesta structure. Its significance has yet to be determined, though archeologists and anthropologists continue to study it.

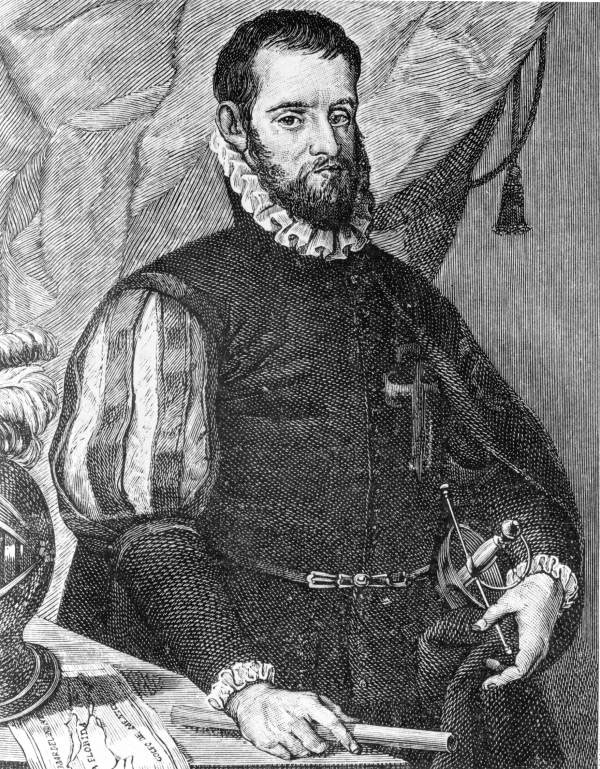
Pedro Menéndez de Avilés maintained a friendly relationship with the Tequesta.

The Spanish described the Tequesta as greatly feared by their sailors, who suspected the natives of torturing and killing survivors of shipwrecks. Spanish priests wrote that the Tequesta performed child sacrifices to mark the occasion of making peace with a tribe with whom they had been fighting. Like the Calusa, the Tequesta hunted small game, but depended more upon roots and less on shellfish in their diets. They did not practice cultivated agriculture. They were skilled canoeists and hunted in the open ocean what Fontaneda described as whales, but were probably manatees. They lassoed the manatees and drove a stake through their snouts.

The first contact with Spanish explorers occurred in 1513 when Juan Ponce de León stopped at a bay he called Chequescha, or Biscayne Bay. Finding the Tequesta unwelcoming, he left to make contact with the Calusa. Menéndez met the Tequesta in 1565 and maintained a friendly relationship with them, building some houses and setting up a mission. He also took the chief's nephew to Havana to be educated, and the chief's brother to Spain. After Menéndez visited, there are few records of the Tequesta: a reference to them in 1673, and further Spanish contact to convert them. The last reference to the Tequesta during their existence was written in 1743 by a Spanish priest named Father Alaña, who described their ongoing assault by another tribe. The survivors numbered only 30, and the Spanish transported them to Havana. In 1770 a British surveyor described multiple deserted villages in the region where the Tequesta had lived. Archeologist John Goggin suggested that by the time European Americans settled the area in 1820, any remaining Tequesta were assimilated into the Seminole people. Common descriptions of Native Americans in Florida by 1820 identified only the "Seminoles".

== Mayaimi ==
The Mayaimi people inhabited the Belle Glade culture area, the area surrounding Lake Mayaimi (now Lake Okeechobee), which included the northern part of the Everglades. Little is known of the Mayaimies. Hernando de Escalante Fontaneda, a Spaniard who lived as a captive with the native peoples of southern Florida for 17 years in the mid-16th century, identified Mayaimi as the first town on the lake of Mayaimi. Mayaimies were among 270 south Florida natives evacuated to Cuba in 1711. In 1743, 100 Mayamies, St. Lucie's, and Mayacas were reported to be living four days' journey north of the Miami River.

== Seminole and Miccosukee ==
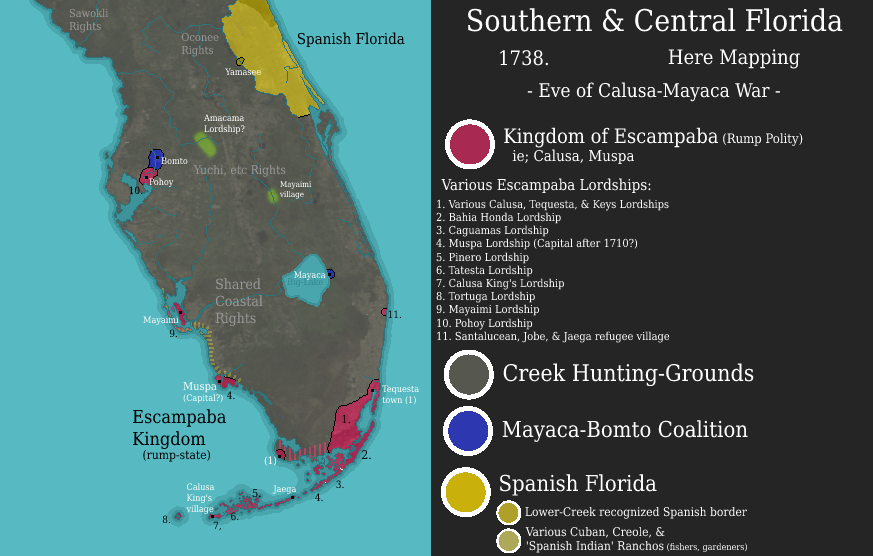
A colored map showing the polities in the lower half of the Florida peninsula in 1738

Following the demise of the Calusa and Tequesta, Native Americans in southern Florida were referred to as "Spanish Indians" in the 1740s, probably due to their friendlier relations with Spain. Between the Spanish defeat in the Seven Years' War in 1763 and the end of the American War of Independence in 1783, Great Britain ruled Florida. The term "Seminolie" was first used by a British Indian agent in a document dated 1771.

The beginnings of the tribe are vague, but records show that Muscogee invaded the Florida peninsula, conquering and assimilating what was left of precontact societies into the Creek Confederacy. The mixing of cultures is evident in the language influences present among the Seminoles: various Muskogean languages, notably Hitchiti, and Mvskoke, as well as Timucuan. In the early 19th century, a US Indian agent explained the Seminoles this way: "The word Seminole means runaway or broken off. Hence ... applicable to all the Indians in the Territory of Florida as all of them ran away ... from the Creek ... Nation".

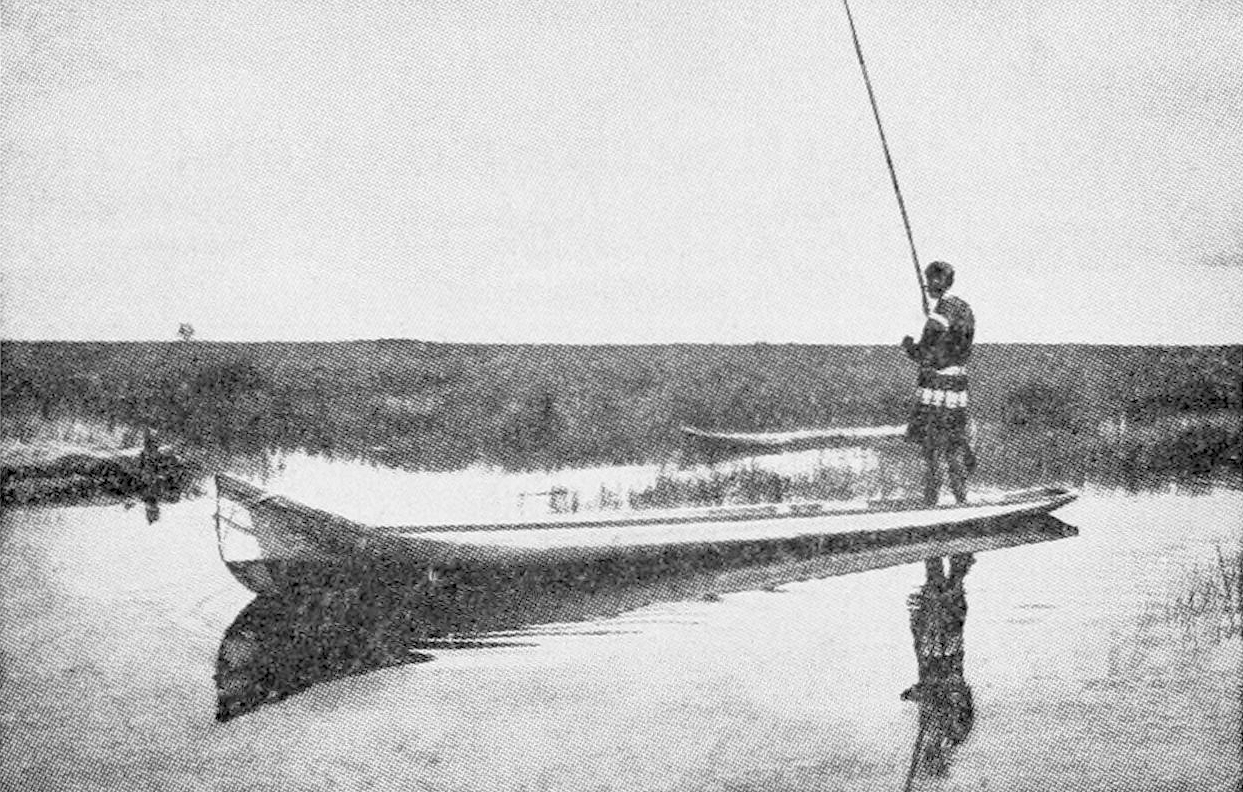
A Seminole man fishing in the Everglades, 1919

After the collapse of the Spanish mission system in northern Florida at the beginning of the 18th century, Yamassees and Muscogulges (speakers of Muscogean languages) raided far into the Florida peninsula, killing many of the Florida natives, and capturing others for sale as slaves. Continued raiding by Muscogulges pushed the last Calusas and other peoples into extreme southern Florida. The last 60 Calusas on Key West were evacuated to Cuba in 1760. Bernard Romans reported that the coast between Cape Sable and Cape Romano was the last refuge of the Calusa before they were driven off the continent by the Muscogulges, and that the last 80 families of Calusa left Florida for Havana in 1763, when Florida was ceded by Spain to Britain. Spanish Indians however, long considered to consist primarily of Calusas that had remained in Florida, are now regarded as being descended from Muscogean-speakers who had arrived in southern Florida early in the 18th century.

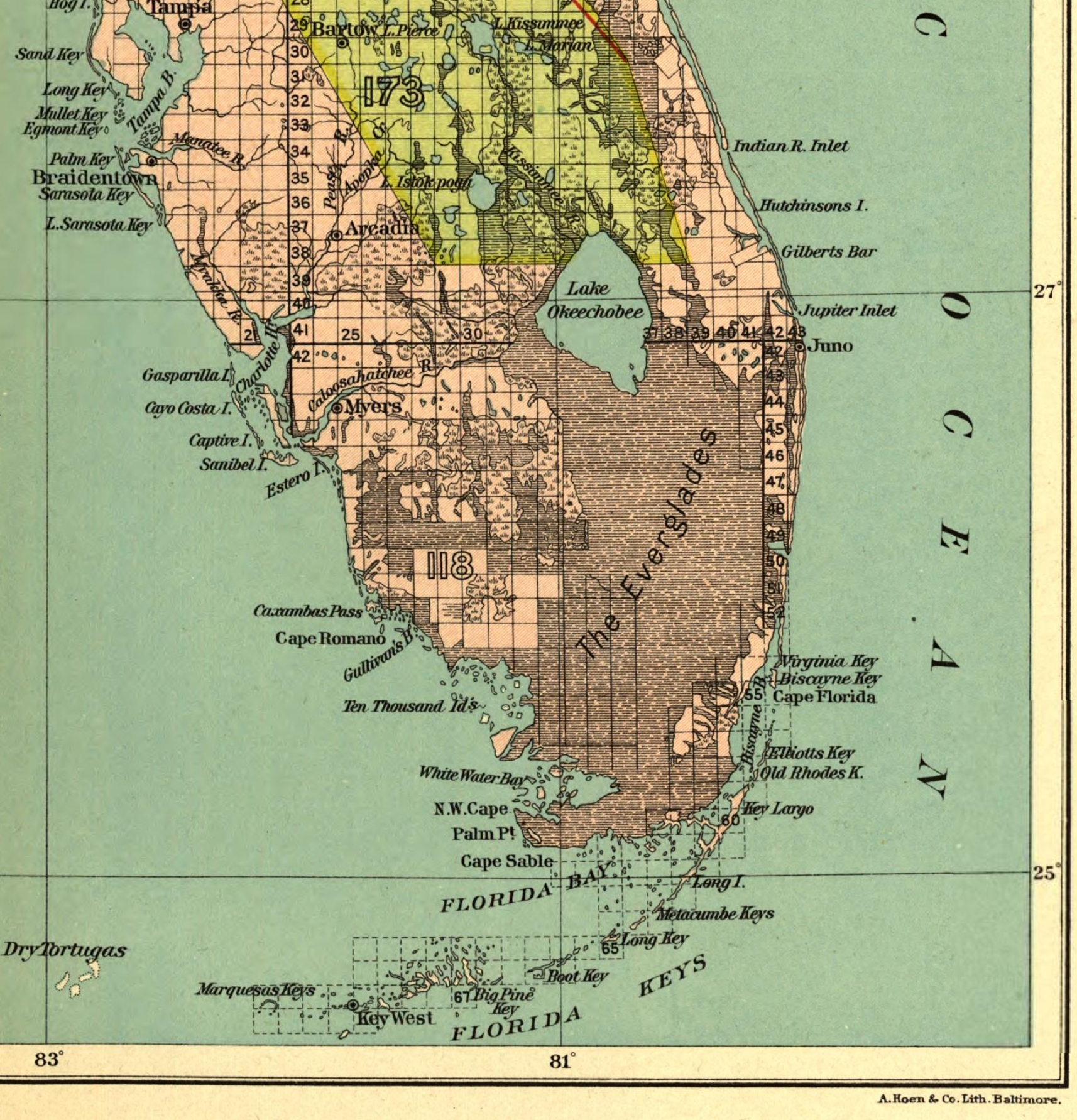
A Florida Indian Land Cessions map showing Cession 118 and Cession 173 (1832 Treaty with the Seminole). The Everglades' boundaries resisted early American settlement.

Muscogee, who were centered in modern-day Alabama and Georgia, were known to incorporate conquered tribes into their own. Some Africans escaping slavery from South Carolina and Georgia fled to Florida, lured by Spanish promises of freedom should they convert to Catholicism, and found their way into the tribe.

In 1817, Andrew Jackson invaded Florida to hasten its annexation to the United States in what became the First Seminole War. Seminoles originally settled in the northern portion of the territory, but the 1823 Treaty of Moultrie Creek (Cession 118) forced them to live on a 5-million-acre (20,000 km^{2}) reservation north of Lake Okeechobee. Cession 118 extended west of the Everglades. They soon ranged farther south, where they numbered approximately 300 in the Everglades region, including bands of Miccosukees—a similar tribe who spoke a different language—who lived in The Big Cypress. Unlike the Calusa and Tequesta, the Seminole depended more on agriculture and raised domesticated animals. They hunted for what they ate, and traded with European-American settlers. They lived in structures called chickees, open-sided palm-thatched huts, probably adapted from the Calusa.

The 1832 Treaty of Payne's Landing (Cession 173) took territory from the Seminole north of Lake Okeechobee. After Florida became a U.S. territory, conflicts between settlers and Seminoles increased, causing the Second Seminole War from 1835 to 1842, resulting in almost 4,000 Seminoles throughout Florida being displaced or killed. The Seminole Wars pushed the Indians farther south and directly into the Everglades. Those who did not flee into the Everglades were relocated to Oklahoma Indian Territory. The Third Seminole War occurred from 1855 to 1859. Over the course of the third conflict, 20 Seminoles were killed and 240 were removed. By 1913, Seminoles in the Everglades numbered no more than 325. They made their villages in hardwood hammocks, islands of hardwood trees that formed in rivers or pine rockland forests. Seminole diets consisted of hominy and coontie roots, fish, turtles, venison, and small game.

Villages were not large, due to the limited size of hammocks, which on average measured between one and 10 acres (40,000 m^{2}). In the center of the village was a cook-house, and the largest structure was reserved for eating. When the Seminoles lived in northern Florida, they wore hide and fur clothing similar to their Muscogee predecessors. The heat and humidity of the Everglades influenced their adapting a different style of dress. Seminoles replaced their heavier buckskins with clothing of unique calico patchwork designs made of lighter cotton, or silk for more formal occasions.

The Seminole Wars increased the U.S. military presence in the Everglades, which resulted in the exploration and mapping of many regions that had not previously been recorded. The military officers who had done the mapping and charting of the Everglades were approached by Thomas Buckingham Smith in 1848 to consult on the feasibility of draining the region for agricultural use.

=== Modern times ===
Between the end of the Third Seminole War and 1930, a few hundred Seminoles continued to live in relative isolation in the Everglades area. Flood control and drainage projects in the area beginning in the early 20th century opened up much land for development and significantly altered the natural environment, inundating some areas while leaving former swamps dry and arable. These projects, along with the completion of the Tamiami Trail which bisected the Everglades in 1930, simultaneously ended old ways of life and introduced new opportunities. A steady stream of white developers and tourists came to the area, and the native people began to work in local farms, ranches, and souvenir stands. They cleared land for the town of Everglades, and were "the best fire fighters [the National Park Service] could recruit" when Everglades National Park caught fire in times of drought.

As metropolitan areas in South Florida began to grow, the Miccosukee branch of the Seminoles became closely associated with the Everglades, simultaneously seeking privacy and serving as a tourist attraction, wrestling alligators, selling crafts, and giving eco-tours of their land. As of 2025, six Seminole and Miccosukee reservations throughout Florida feature casino gaming that supports the tribe.

== See also ==
- History of Florida
- Indigenous peoples of the Southeastern Woodlands

== Bibliography ==
- Carr, Robert S. (2012). Digging Miami. Gainesville, Florida: University Press of Florida. ISBN 978-0-8130-4206-0.
- Douglas, Marjory Stoneman (2002) [1947]. The Everglades: River of Grass. R. Bemis Publishing. ISBN 0-912451-44-0.
- Gannon, Michael, ed. (1996). The New History of Florida. University Press of Florida. ISBN 0-8130-1415-8.
- Griffin, John (2002). Archeology of the Everglades. University Press of Florida. ISBN 0-8130-2558-3.
- Hammond, E. A. (1972). "The Spanish Fisheries of Charlotte Harbor". Florida Historical Quarterly. 51 (4): 355–380.
- Hann, John, ed. (1991). Missions to the Calusa. University Press of Florida. ISBN 0-8130-1966-4.
- Hann, John H. (2003). Indians of Central and South Florida 1513-1763. Gainesville, Florida: University Press of Florida. ISBN 978-0-8130-2645-9.
- McCally, David (1999). The Everglades: An Environmental History. University Press of Florida. ISBN 0-8130-2302-5.
- Milanich, Jerald T. (1994). Archaeology of Precolumbian Florida. Gainesville, Florida: University Press of Florida. ISBN 9-780-8130-1273-5.
- Milanich, Jerald T. (1995). Florida Indians and the Invasion from Europe. University Press of Florida. ISBN 978-0-8130-1636-8.
- Milanich, Jerald T. (1998). Florida's Indians from Ancient Times to the Present. University Press of Florida. ISBN 978-0-8130-1599-6.
- Schwadron, Margo (2010). Landscapes of Maritime Complexity: Prehistoric Shell Works sites of the Ten Thousand Island, Florida (PDF) (PhD). University of Leicester. Archived from the original on November 1, 2018.
- Sturtevant, William C. (1953). "Chakaika and the "Spanish Indians"" (PDF). Tequesta. 13: 63–64. Archived from the original (PDF) on 2012-02-08 – via Digital Collections Florida International University.
- Tebeau, Charlton (1968). Man in the Everglades: 2000 Years of Human History in the Everglades National Park. University of Miami Press.
