= Pine Island Canal =

Pre-historic canal in Florida

Coordinates: 26.66120°N 82.14811°W

The Pine Island Canal (8LL34) (Note: Smithsonian trinomials are identifiers assigned to archaeological sites in the United States. The numeral "8" indicates that the site is in Florida, the "LL" that it is in Lee County, and the "34" that it was the 34th site registered in the county.) is a canal, now heavily damaged, which crosses Pine Island in Florida from the Pineland Site on the west side of the island to the Indian Field archaeological site on the east side, a distance of about 4 kilometres (2.5 mi). The canal was dug about 500 to 1,000 years ago, and is believed to have been used as a canoe route. Much of the canal has been damaged or destroyed by development since the late 19th century. A continuation of the Pine Island Canal (the now completely destroyed Cape Coral Canal) may have crossed Cape Coral and been part of a canoe route connecting the Pineland Site with Lake Okeechobee through the Ortona site near the head of the Caloosahatchee River.

== Prehistoric canals in the southeastern United States ==
The Pine Island Canal (and its apparent extension, the Cape Coral Canal) is one of several prehistoric long-distance (greater than 1 kilometre (0.62 mi) in length) canoe canals in southern Florida. The Mud Lake Canal (8MO32), which crosses the base of Cape Sable in Everglades National Park, is the best preserved of the canals. Nearby is the obscure Snake Bight Canal (8MO29). The Naples Canal (8CR59), in Naples, has been destroyed by development. Two canals connect the archaeological site at Ortona with the Caloosahatchee River, bypassing rapids in the river. George Luer suggests that construction of the Pine Island Canal and of similar canals elsewhere in southern Florida are indications of the integration of the region under the Calusa. Shorter canals may have passed through sites with multiple mounds, including Mound Key in Lee County and Big Mound Key in Charlotte County. The mound complexes at the Pineland and Indian Field sites at either end of the Pine Island Canal also had canoe canals passing through them.

Other prehistoric canoe canals outside of southern Florida include Walker's Canal (8WL344), Walton County, in the Florida Panhandle, and the Gulf Shores Canoe Canal (1BA709) in Gulf Shores, Alabama.

== Location ==
Pine Island is low lying, and its shores were largely covered by mangroves. One of the few places providing easy access to the interior of the island from the water was the group of shell mounds at what is now called the Pineland Site. Late nineteenth-century visitors to the Pineland area described a canal extending across Pine Island from the Pineland site. By the 1970s, however, much of the canal had been altered by development, and was in danger of disappearing.

The canal crossed Pine Island, connecting the Pineland Site on the northwest side of the island with a couple of burial mounds and a shell key called Indian Field on the northeast side. The canal was 4 kilometres (2.5 mi) long. The Pineland and Indian Field sites date to late-prehistoric and early historic times. The canal was likely dug 500 to 1,000 years ago, and possibly as early as 2,000 years ago. Useppa Island lies opposite Pineland on the west side of Pine Island Sound, and the Cape Coral Canal apparently began on the mainland opposite from Indian Field, so that a straight line from Useppa to more than halfway across Cape Coral stays very close to the Pine Island Canal and the western portion of the Cape Coral Canal. The eastern end of the Cape Coral Canal probably reached the Caloosahatchee River above the open estuary of the lower river. This route would have been shorter than, and avoided the hazards of, the open water of the Pine Island Sound, Matlacha Pass, San Carlos Bay, and the lower Caloosahatchee River.

== Condition ==
Late nineteenth-century visitors Frank Cushing and Andrew Douglas described the Pine Island Canal at its western end at the Pineland Site as being 9 metres (30 ft) wide and 1.5 to 2.5 metres (4.9 to 8.2 ft) deep measured from the tops of the berms along both sides of the canal. By 1980 the canal through the Pineland Site had become a narrow irrigation ditch As the canoes used by the Indigenous peoples of Florida were on average only 40 centimetres (16 in) wide, and had a draft of no more than 15 centimetres (5.9 in), the canal dimensions were ample for canoe use.

The western part of the canal beyond the Pineland site crossed land that has been cleared and levelled, and no trace of the canal could be found in 1980. Aerial photographs from the 1970s showed a thin linear feature crossing the eastern part of the island towards the Indian Field site. Ground inspection in 1980 found that the raised ridges flanking the canal were badly eroded, elevated no more than 10 centimeters above the natural ground level, while the canal bed was largely filled in and only a few centimeters below the natural ground level. The canal was overgrown with the pines and saw palmettos that covered the surrounding land. At some points on the eastern side of the island the canal had been further impacted by the cutting of firebreaks and the removal of pine stumps.

Aerial photos from the 1950s, before land on the western side of the island was cleared, clearly showed the canal extending all the way across the island. In those photos the canal bed was consistently about 4.5 metres (15 ft) wide, and the raised banks were each about 6 metres (20 ft) wide, with a total width of 16.5 metres (54 ft).

== Construction ==
A trench across a relatively undisturbed section of the canal in the middle of the island revealed a profile consistent with measurements based on aerial photographs. The swale between the canal banks was about 5.5 metres (18 ft) wide, the crest of each bank was about another 3.5 metres (11 ft) from the swale, while the crests of the canal banks were about 13 metres (43 ft) apart. Sand had eroded from the banks into the canal. Differences in the color of the sand in the walls of the trench indicated that the canal bed had originally been about 8 metres (26 ft) wide and 30 centimetres (12 in) below the natural level of the ground, and about 5 metres (16 ft) wide and 60 centimetres (24 in) below the natural level of the ground. A hardpan had formed at the 60 cm level, comparable to the hardpan in undisturbed soil away from the canal. Luer presumes that the canal would have been deeper to reach groundwater. At least 30 thousand cubic metres (1.1 million cubic feet) of soil were excavated to construct the canal.

The eastern end of the canal reaches Matlacha Pass opposite an island called Indian Field. The canal probably continued across the tidal zone of Pine Island, but natural forces and the digging of mosquito control ditches have erased all traces of that part of the canal. Two sand burial mounds were near the eastern end of the canal. One, recorded as "Pine Island 8" (8LL40), was completely dismantled by Clarence Bloomfield Moore in 1900 and 1904. Moore found more than 250 burials in the mound. The second burial mound and another site, (8LL783 and 8LL784), have not been scientifically studied, but vandals removed some human remains from the sites. Artifacts excavated from the Pine Island 8 mound included many of European origin, indicating that the mound was in use after European contact. Luer suggests that the close association of the Pine Island 8 mound, the Indian Field site, and the Pine Island canal indicates that the canal was probably constructed in late pre-Columbian times and continued in use after European contact.

== Elevations ==
The ends of the Pine Island Canal at Pineland and Indian Field were at sea level. The interior of Pine Island reaches 3.7 to 4 metres (12 to 13 ft) elevation above sea level. The canal was no wider at the summit of the island than at its sea level ends, demonstrating that it was not a sea level canal, as that would have required a much deeper and wider cut in the middle of the island. The canal was not an open channel or sluiceway, as there was no stream or pond to feed water into it. (Note: The canals at Ortona were fed by such sources.) The water level in the canal was probably controlled by dividing it into a series of impoundments separated by control structures. Pine Island has a shallow water table in poorly drained soils, providing a supply of groundwater near the surface. The canal was generally linear, but included bends and curved sections.

Pine Island is generally low with flat or gently sloping areas. The island is surrounded by tidal flats covered by mangroves. The interior part of the island is relatively flat, 3 to 4 metres (9.8 to 13.1 ft) above sea level. A series of terraces running the length of the island successively rise from the tidal flats to the central flat. There are occasional sharp rises between terraces. Drainage is relatively good on slopes, but poor over flat areas, where water from rainfall accumulates, sometimes leaving standing water in slight depressions. The surface slopes more sharply near the eastern shore of the island. Prior to agricultural development in the 20th century, the water table was within 10 inches (250 mm) of the surface over much of the island during the rainy season, from June to September, but may have fallen to 40 inches (1,000 mm) below the surface during dry spells. A shallow hardpan underlay the topsoil across most of the island, slowing the drainage of the topsoil.

The ends of the canal at Pineland and Indian Field are subject to average tides of a little over .5 metres (1 ft 8 in), which would have had only a minor effect on the water table near the ends of the canal. While the level of fluctuations in sea level that may have occurred over the period the canal was in use probably had little effect on the water table in the interior of the island, even small changes in sea level may have required adjustments to the ends of the canal. The primary factors affecting the usefulness of the canal would have been variations in rainfall.

== Water level and flow ==
Luer and Wheeler used old aerial photographs to trace the route of the canal across Pine Island. They discerned four long curved segments, three long straight segments, and four short segments, as well as segments at the two ends of the canal, for a total of 14 segments. They determined that the straight segments crossed land that was level or very close to level, that the curved segments followed contour lines to avoid depressions in the path of the canal, and that the short segments occurred where there were sharp changes in elevation, generally at the edges of terraces. Some of the long segments diverged from a straight line between the ends, so that the rise in elevation over the length of the segment was minimized.

The 14 canal segments proposed by Luer and Wheeler were 50 to 2,000 feet (15 to 610 m) long. One segment of 100 feet (30 m) was completely level, while the other segments had a difference in elevation between ends of 0.2 to 3.85 feet (0.061 to 1.173 m). With the difference in elevation across the island, water in the canal would flow downhill, leaving the canal in the center of the island dry, and possibly eroding the banks of the canal. Luer and Wheeler propose that control structures along the canal served as dams to prevent the flow of water during normal conditions, and as spillways to allow excess water to flow to lower levels as needed. The control structures divided the canal into seven or eight impoundments, so that each impoundment would hold the water level high enough to float a canoe at the upper end, but not overflow the canal banks at the low end of the impoundment. Each segment of the canal was deep enough to fall below the normal level of the water table, close to or slightly down into the hardpan, which helped maintain the perched water table. If the water table fell below the bottom of the canal at the upper end of the impoundment, canoes would have had to be dragged over the dry portion.

As the water level in an impoundment would not be parallel to the adjacent water table (which would tend to be parallel to the ground level, water would seep into the upper end of an impoundment, and from the lower end of an impoundment back into the ground. The water level in an impoundment varied with the level of the water table, the amount of rainfall, and the rate of evaporation. The water table was generally higher during the rainy season, and could fall low enough during the dry season and droughts to leave large potions of the canal dry. When archaeologists excavated a cross-section of the canal in June 1981 after a more than year-long drought, the water table was 1 metre (3 ft 3 in) below ground level. In 1995, during a wet year, the water table at that location was 15 to 20 centimetres (5.9 to 7.9 in) below ground level in March and above ground level (I.e., flooding) in July. Digging and maintaining the canal would have been easier during the dry season. Control structures were probably placed at the points on the canal reached by high tides up to 0.3 metres (1 ft 0 in) above mean sea level, while the tidal segments had to be deep enough to accommodate low tides of as much as 0.3 metres (1 ft 0 in) below mean sea level. No control structures have been excavated by archaeologists, but Luer and Wheeler suggest that dams could have been constructed from cabbage palm logs.

== Climate history ==
The period in which the Pine Island Canal was constructed likely was constrained by climate variations that affected the Gulf coast of southwestern Florida. There is little or no evidence of canal construction in southwest Florida until after the 5th century. The Roman Warm Period, a period of warm weather and high sea levels (the Wulfert High) in southwest Florida, transitioned into the Vandal Minimum from 500 to 850, bringing cooler weather and lower sea levels (the Buck Key Low) to the area. Pine Island Sound is shallow, and even a small lowering of the sea level adversely affected people living on the eastern shore of the sound. The Pineland site, Josslyn Island, and Galt Island are on or next to Pine Island on the eastern shore of the sound, and abandonment of the sites is indicated by an absence of midden deposits at those sites that can be dated to the 9th century. It is believed that the population centers of the sound shifted to the barrier islands on the west side of the sound such as Cayo Costa and Sanibel Island, and islands in the western part of the sound, such as Buck Key and Useppa Island, where there are midden deposits dated to the 9th century.

The Medieval Warm Period (the "Mississippian Optimum" in North America) commenced about 850, and sea levels on the southwest Florida coast began rising in the La Costa High, re-filling the Pine Island Sound. Middens at the sites on and adjacent to Pine Island contain rich deposits of fish bones and shells dating to between 900 and 1200. Settlement patterns on Pine Island Sound changed as the sea level rose, from a dispersed pattern to concentrations at sites with mounds, while existing mounds were raised higher. Marquardt and Walker note that prior to 900, the people around the sound moved their settlements back and forth across the land in response to changing sea levels, while after 900 they moved up on mounds in response to rising sea levels. The warmer weather that brought higher sea levels also produced more powerful and/or more frequent tropical cyclones producing storm surges, another reason to live on mounds. Late in the 11th century the climate quickly cooled and the sea level fell. The lack of evidence for midden deposits around 1100 at Pineland, Josslyn Island, and Galt Island indicate they may have all been abandoned for a while. The climatic cooling and lowered sea levels soon reversed, and Pineland was re-occupied by 1150, while Josslyn and Galt islands were re-occupied by 1200. By early in the 13th century the sea level had fallen again in southwestern Florida, the beginning of the Sanibel II Low, which lasted through the Little Ice Age until about 1850. There were fluctuations in the sea level throughout the Sanibel II Low, although it never fell as far as it had during the Buck Key Low associated with the Vandal Minimum.

The mounds associated with previous settlements along the western side of Pine Island had been parallel to the shore, but the mounds that developed after 900 at Pineland were perpendicular to the shore. A canal, which may have originally been a creek, ran inland between the two highest mounds. Pottery characteristic of the Belle Glade culture, in inland Florida, became common at Pineland around the same time, possibly indicating an increase in trade facilitated by higher inland water levels and the construction of canoe canals. The production of edged tools from the shells of the lightning whelk, Sinistrofulgur sinistrum, became more standardized from 800 to 1200, possibly because of an increased demand for the production of dugout canoes. The people of Pineland continued to rely on fishing, hunting and gathering for subsistence. Imported pottery and adoption of pottery styles that originated elsewhere in Florida indicated a continuation of trade. Mound building continued at least until about 1500, when Europeans began to enter the area. The conversion of a natural creek into the Pineland end of the canal may have started in 1200–1250.

== Indian Field ==
Indian Field (8LL39), previously known as "Indian Old Field", is a shell works island with two shell mounds. (The island is privately owned, and visitors must have prior permission to enter the property.) Ceramic sherds of a type carbon-dated to 600 to 1100 BP at another site have been found at Indian Field. (Frank Hamilton Cushing reported in 1897 that he had been told that the Pine Island Canal reached "shell elevations" on the east side of Pine Island, which Luer assumes means Indian Field.)

A valley extends through the Indian Field island. Luer describes this valley as a partially filled-in channel, originally at sea level, that was an extension of the canal across Pine Island. Luer notes that the channel is similar in width to the canal on Pine Island. A mound on the northern end of the island has been heavily modified, and has an occupied residence on its top. A smaller and lower shell deposit is on the south end of the island. Luer notes similarities of the features at Indian Field with other shell works sites in the Charlotee Harbor area. Luer interprets Indian Field as a way-station or monitoring point on a canoe route from the Pineland site across Pine Island and Matlacha Pass to the mainland and eastward.

== Cape Coral Canal ==
In 1883, Charles Kenworthy of the Smithsonian Institution reported a claim that the Pine Island Canal continued on the mainland for another 14 miles (23 km). Aerial photographs from the 1940s of the Cape Coral area, across Malatcha Pass from Pine Island, show a linear feature that resembles the Pine Island Canal in aerial photographs of the same period. (The Cape Coral area has been subject to extensive development starting in the late 1950s, and no trace of the linear feature was visible in the late 1980s.) The feature was visible in the photos over about 6.5 kilometres (4.0 mi), starting about 8 kilometres (5.0 mi) east of Indian Field and running eastward about 3.2 kilometres (2.0 mi). The line then turned and ran east-northeast for another 3.2 kilometres (2.0 mi), disappearing near Hancock Creek (a tributary of the Caloosahatchee River). Luer suggests that if the Cape Coral Canal extended a little beyond the end of the trace visible in aerial photos, it would have passed through a pond near the head of Hancock Creek and then reached the Corbett Mound (9LL24), a flat-topped sand mound next to a pond near Yellow Fever Creek, another tributary of the Caloosahatchee River.

== Sources ==
- Luer, George M. (June 1989). "Calusa Canals in Southwestern Florida: Routes of Tribute and Exchange". The Florida Anthropologist. 42 (2): 89–130 – via University of Florida Digital Collections.
- Luer, George M.; House, Wayne "Bud" (March 2001). "Further Loss of the Pine Island Canal, with Comments on Segment 3". The Florida Anthropologist. 54 (1): 55–56 – via University of Florida Digital Collections.
- Luer, George M.; Wheeler, Ryan J. (September 1997). "How the Pine Island Canal Worked: Topography, Hydraulics, and Engineering". The Florida Anthropologist. 50 (3): 115–131 – via University of Florida Digital Collections.
- Marquardt, William H.; Walker, Karen J. (2012a). "Southwest Florida during the Mississippi Period". In Ashley, Keith; White, Nancy Marie (eds.). Late Prehistoric Florida. Gainesville, Florida: University Press of Florida. pp. 29–61. ISBN 978-0-8130-4014-1 – via ResearchGate.
- Marquardt, William H.; Walker, Karen J. (2012b). "The Pineland Site Complex: An Environmental and Cultural History". In Marquardt, William H.; Walker, Karen J. (eds.). The Archaeology of Pineland: A Coastal Southwest Florida Site Complex. Gainesville, Florida: University Press of Florida. pp. 793–920. ISBN 9781881448136 – via ResearchGate.
- Wheeler, Ryan J. (December 1995). "The Ortona Canals: Aboriginal Canal Hydraulics and Engineering". The Florida Anthropologist. 48 (4): 265–281 – via University of Florida Digital Collection.
- Wheeler, Ryan J. (1998). "Walker's Canal: An Aboriginal Canal in the Florida Panhandle". Southeastern Archaeology. 17 (2): 174–181. ISSN 0734-578X. JSTOR 40713124.
- Waselkov, Gregory A.; Beebe, Donald A.; Cyr, Howard; Chamberlain, Elizabeth L.; Mehta, Jayur Madhusudan; Nelson, Erin S. (2022). "History and Hydrology: Engineering Canoe Canals in the Estuaries of the Gulf of Mexico". Journal of Field Archaeology. 47 (7): 486–500. doi:10.1080/00934690.2022.2090747. ISSN 0093-4690.
