= Pineland Archeological District =

Historic district in Florida, United States

- U.S. National Register of Historic Places
- U.S. Historic district
- Location within Florida Location within the United States
- Location: Lee County, Florida
- Nearest city: Pineland
- Coordinates: 26.66°N 82.15°W
- MPS: Archeological Resources of the Caloosahatchee Region MPS
- NRHP reference No.: 73000583
- Added to NRHP: November 27, 1973

The Pineland Archeological District (also known as Battey's Landing or Battey Place or the Pineland Site) is a U.S. historic district (designated as such on November 27, 1973) located on Pine Island, near Pineland, Florida, and next to Pine Island Sound. The site was occupied by people of the Caloosahatchee culture, known as the Calusa in historic times, from 500 BCE until after 1700. The site includes shell and sand mounds and other structures and prehistoric canals and artificial lakes. It also includes structures from the late 19th and early 20th centuries.

== Description ==
The Pineland Archeological District includes a number of mounds and other features. Close to the shore is Battey's Landing (8LL35), consisting of the Brown Mound Complex, with five mounds, to the northwest, and to the southeast, the Randell Mound Complex, with two mounds. The two complexes are separated by the western end of the Pine Island Canal (8LL34). Southeast of the Randell Mound Complex, close to the shore, is the Old Mound, or Pineland Midden (8LL37). Inland to the south of the canal are the Surf Clam Ridge, the Citrus Ridge, the Smith Mound, or Pineland Burial Mound (8LL36), and the Low Mound (8LL1612). Furthest inland, north of the canal, is Adam's Mound (8LL38). The Pineland site was in use for most of the Caloosahatchee culture period, from about 50 until after 1700. The site also includes historic buildings, such as the Pineland Post Office and the Ruby Gill House.

The Pineland Site Complex is an area designated for the protection of the archaeological and natural resources of the Pineland site, managed by the University of Florida Foundation. In partnership with the Archeological Conservancy, the University of Florida Foundation, Lee County and the Calusa Land Trust, the State of Florida has designated 211 acres (85 ha) as an area of Critical Historical Resources. In 1996, the Randell family gave 53 acres (210,000 m^{2}) of the site to the University of Florida, which the museum now operates as the Randell Research Center. As of 2012, 63 acres (25 ha) had been acquired by the state, and negotiations were underway to buy full ownership or conservation easements on several remaining parcels. The Randell Research Center is a research and educational facility at Pineland operated by the Florida Museum of Natural History.

== Battey's Landing ==
The heart of the Pineland site, Battey's Landing, covered about 100 acres (40 ha) when visited by Frank Hamilton Cushing in 1895, but by 1989 only 20 acres (8.1 ha) remained intact, preserved by landowners Don and Pat Randell. Cushing described the site as extending about .25 miles (0.40 km) inland and about .75 miles (1.21 km) along the shore, with the "high-built" portions (including the courts) covering at least 75 to 80 acres (30 to 32 ha). He reported five "enormous" rectangular courts, enclosed by nine quadrangular foundation terraces. A series of benches, courts and enclosures extended to the south of the main site, diminishing in size. The courts were connected to Pine Island Sound by canals. Cushing described the Pine Island Canal, leading from Pine Island Sound between two "very high shell elevations" to a court that was lower than the others. From the eastern end of the court, a canal 30 feet (9.1 m) wide and 6 feet (1.8 m) deep ran east into the interior of the island. Much of the Battey's Landing site, and in particular, the courts, was being used for agriculture at the time of Cushing's visit.

== Other features ==
Unlike the other mounds at Pineland, which were shell middens, the Smith Mound is a sand mound with thin layers of shell, and was used for burials. The Smith Mound was originally about 300 feet (91 m) long and 30 feet (9.1 m) high. (Cushing gave dimensions for this mound of 375 feet (114 m) long, 150 feet (46 m) wide and 58 feet (18 m) high. (Note: Cushing has been said to have used 'hyperbole' in his estimates of the heights of mounds.)) It was surrounded by a pond fed by a canal which branched from the Pine Island Canal. A path wound around the mound to the summit, which was narrow but flat. Cushing observed potsherds, broken shell ladles, and human bones on the mound. The Smith Mound was constructed around 1000 years ago. Part of the mound was destroyed more than a century ago, and the adjacent pond and canal filled in. Half of the mound and the pond were preserved by its owner, Captain Smith.

== History ==
The Pineland site faces the shallow Pine Island Sound. The people of Pineland were largely dependent on fish and shellfish taken from the Sound for sustenance. Early in the Current Era, during the Roman Warm Period, sea levels were comparable to or higher than current levels. (Note: Marquardt and Walker list the Wulfert High sea level, corresponding to the Roman Warm Period (100 BCE - 500), Buck Key Low sea level, corresponding to the Vandal Minimum (500 -850), La Costa High sea level, corresponding to the Medieval Warm Period (850-1200), and Sanibel II Low sea level, corresponding to the Little Ice Age (1200 - 1850). Mitchell-Tapping et al. posit a sea level along the southwest Florida coast about 1.2 metres (3.9 ft) above late 20th century mean sea level (MSL) during the Wulfert High, and about 0.6 metres (2.0 ft) below late 20th century MSL during the Buck Key Low, with smaller excursions during the La Costa High and Sanibel II Low.) The people of Pineland during this period left linear shell middens parallel to the shore. Several lines of middens formed as people moved back and forth in response to variations in the sea level in the Sound. As the climate shifted into a cooler period, sometimes called the Vandal Minimum, sea levels fell to the point that Pine Island Sound no longer supported a fishery adequate to the needs of the Pineland population.

Sometime during the 9th century, Pineland and other population centers along the west side of Pine Island, such as Josslyn Island and Galt Island, were abandoned in favor of sites with access to deeper water on the barrier islands, such as the Mark Pardo Shellworks Site, and on islands on the west side of Pine Island Sound, such as Useppa. This corresponds to the beginning of the Caloosahatchee IIB period, marked by changes in ceramics. The onset of the Medieval Warm Period brought a rapid return of sea level in Pine Island Sound to former levels, and Pineland was reoccupied in the 10th century.

Starting in the 10th century, the people of Pineland constructed linear mounds in groups, with the mounds oriented perpendicular to the shoreline, in contrast to the earlier middens parallel to the shoreline. These mounds reached heights of up to 7 metres (23 ft) by about 1200, at the end of the Caloosahatchee IIB period. During this period a natural waterway passing between the Brown and Randell mound complexes was altered into the western end of the Pine Island Canal. The Smith Mound was also started in the 11th century. A pronounced cool spell, around 1100, briefly lowered sea levels in Pine Island Sound, and the Pineland site was apparently abandoned from before 1100 until about 1150. The Little Ice Age began around 1200, again lowering sea levels in Pine Island Sound, but never as low as during the Vandal Minimum.
