= Nature Girl =

Nature Girl may refer to:

- "Nature Girl", a single and EP by 18 Wheeler
- Nature Girl (novel), a 2006 novel by Carl Hiaasen
- "Nature Girl", a cover of the Nat King Cole song "Nature Boy" by Danish rock band Cryoshell
- Nature Girl (comics), a character appearing in Marvel Comics
