= Galt Island (Florida) =

Island in Lee County, Florida, United States

- Galt Island Galt Island (Florida) (the Caribbean)

Geography
- Location: Lee County, Florida
- Coordinates: 26°30′56″N 82°06′24″W
- Adjacent to: Gulf of Mexico

Administration
- United States
- State: Florida
- County: Lee

Galt Island is an island off the west coast of Florida. It is a part of St. James City in Lee County, near Fort Myers Beach. It contains the Galt Island Archeological District.

== Geography ==
Galt Island is located at 26°30′56″N 82°06′24″W.
