= Nature Girl (novel) =

2006 novel by Carl Hiaasen

- Cover of the first edition of Nature Girl
- Author: Carl Hiaasen
- Cover artist: Charles Burns
- Language: English
- Publisher: Alfred A. Knopf
- Publication date: 2006
- Publication place: United States
- Media type: Print (Hardback & Paperback)
- Pages: 306 pp.
- ISBN: 978-0-307-26299-8
- Preceded by: Skinny Dip
- Followed by: Star Island

Nature Girl is a novel by Carl Hiaasen, published in 2006.

== Plot introduction ==
Honey Santana becomes irritated by telemarketers and invites a particularly obnoxious one to a phony real estate promotion - which she describes as an eco-tour - in the Ten Thousand Islands in order to teach him a lesson. It is thus that telemarketers Boyd Shreave and his reluctant mistress Eugenie Fonda make their way from Texas to Everglades City, Florida, and eventually Dismal Key with Honey, unaware that she is being stalked by Louis Piejack, Honey's perverted and disfigured ex-employer, who is unaware that he is being followed by Fry, Honey's wise and protective twelve-year-old son, and his courageous ex-drug runner father. Also on the island are a young half-Seminole man named Sammy Tigertail and his very willing captive, Gillian, a sex-obsessed, warmhearted Florida State coed. Various odd events surface along the way.

== Detailed plot summary ==
Honey Santana loses her job after she hits her lecherous boss, Louis Piejack. During dinner, she receives a call from telemarketer Boyd Shreave, trying to sell her cheap land. Honey asks Boyd if his mother knows what he does for a living, causing him to insult her; she resolves to track Boyd down to teach him a lesson. Meanwhile, a drunken tourist dies of a heart attack during an airboat ride with Sammy Tigertail, a young half-Seminole. Misconstruing his uncle's advice, he dumps the body in a river and camps out on the Ten Thousand Islands. Sammy's solitude is interrupted by a group of college students having a drunken party. He is about to steal one of their canoes and find another island when one of the students, Gillian, pressures him to take her along.

Boyd loses his job for insulting Honey and his co-worker Eugenie Fonda, the one-time mistress of a tabloid murderer, ends their affair. He is also unaware that his wife, Lily, has hired a private investigator, Dealey, to gather evidence of his infidelity for their divorce. Lily demands more explicit footage of Boyd's affair, causing Dealey to realize that she is now indulging a sexual fetish instead of gathering evidence. Meanwhile, Honey tracks Boyd down and calls him at home, posing as a telemarketer offering a free trip to Florida as part of a timeshare promotion. Boyd seizes the opportunity to try to win Eugenie back, and she is intrigued enough to accept. Honey borrows the airfare from her ex-husband, Perry Skinner, and asks her son, Fry, if he can stay with Perry for a few days.

Boyd and Eugenie arrive at Honey's trailer park. There, Dealey — who has followed the pair — is abducted by Louis, who is stalking Honey. While skateboarding past the trailer park, Fry catches sight of them. Honey leads Boyd and Eugenie on a kayaking trip. By coincidence they land on Dismal Key, where Sammy and Gillian have begun to bond. Fry is so preoccupied worrying about his mother that he collides with a garbage truck on his skateboard, suffering a concussion. Perry, who does not trust the hospital to look after his son, gives him a Miami Dolphins helmet and drives with him to the docks. He spots Louis tailing Honey's kayak in a johnboat and follows them. On Dismal Key, Honey reveals her identity to Boyd and gives him a rehearsed lecture on basic courtesy. Boyd turns to leave with Eugenie, but they find the kayaks gone — Sammy, mistaking them for intruders, has stolen them.

Dealey arrives on Dismal Key with Louis. Sammy finds them, knocks Louis out and takes Dealey prisoner, mistaking him for the tourist's ghost. After Honey, Boyd and Eugenie fall asleep, Sammy sneaks to their campsite to steal water. Eugenie wakes and follows him back, wanting the quickest possible way off the island. There, she meets Dealey, who admits he was sent by Lily. Dealey borrows Gillian's cell phone and calls the Coast Guard for air rescue. Sammy says that Eugenie and Gillian are leaving with him, whether they want to or not. Sensing her last opportunity, Gillian asks Eugenie for some privacy and seduces Sammy. Perry and Fry arrive on the island, with Fry ignoring his father and leaving the boat to find his mother. He runs into Eugenie, who is charmed by Fry's intelligence and manners, and helps him back toward the camp when he is overcome by vertigo.

In the morning, Honey makes Boyd climb a tree with her to watch a sunrise, which fails to impress him. As they climb down, Louis snatches Honey; Boyd watches mutely as she is dragged away. Dealey tries to paddle out in one of Honey's kayaks when a Coast Guard helicopter arrives, but has to be rescued by Gillian when he tips the kayak over and nearly drowns. Fry encourages Eugenie to go, and she is rescued along with Dealey and Gillian. Fry comes upon Louis threatening Honey with a shotgun. Sammy strikes Louis with his guitar, killing him. Perry is shot in the hip during the skirmish, and Honey rushes him and Fry back to the mainland. Sammy disposes of Louis's body using his jon boat. Boyd reaches another island on Sammy's canoe and stumbles on a small religious group who identify him as the returned Jesus Christ.

In the epilogue, Sammy finds a new island and realizes that Gillian is searching for him, but wonders whether or not he wants to keep hiding. Eugenie leaves her telemarketing job and, as a snub to Lily, sends her footage of two mating geckos which she idly filmed on the island with one of Dealey's cameras. Dealey offers her a job in his office. Boyd alienates his religious followers, who kick him out of the group and leave him on the island with his canoe. He makes his way to the mainland, coming across a tourist couple from Chicago asking for a realtor. Honey and Perry get back together while recovering from their injuries. Fry is happy, but worried about whether his mother's obsessiveness will drive them apart again. During dinner, Honey decides not to answer the phone when it rings.

== Characters ==
Like many of Hiaasen's novels, the events of the book are largely driven by the collection of characters who populate it:

- Honey Santana: a single mother. After Fry was born, Honey developed an overpowering fear of reckless, dangerous, or destructive behavior, which has expanded into a perilously low tolerance for general rudeness and thoughtlessness – all of which, Hiaasen assures us, are abundant in South Florida. Honey has some sort of mental illness, and is off her medication, so she always hears songs playing in her head.
- Boyd Shreave: a telemarketer employed by Relentless, Inc. Boyd is a typical Hiaasen bad guy: obnoxious, arrogant, totally self-absorbed and oblivious to both nature and his own shortcomings. He has been in sales for his entire adult life, partly out of laziness, partly out of general unfitness for any other career, and partly based on an unshakeable conviction (reinforced through countless hours of daytime television) that he is superior to the rest of humanity, and that somewhere out there is a market for him, crammed with suckers.
- Eugenie Fonda: Shreave's colleague and mistress. Her major claim to fame is having had a fling with a man who murdered his wife a week later, leading to a highly publicized trial and a book deal. It would also have been her claim to wealth had not a later boyfriend, a stockbroker, convinced her to invest the royalties entirely in Enron. She has seduced Shreave largely out of boredom, the same reason she agrees to accompany him to Florida. She is the author of a potboiler called "Storm Ghoul".
- Fry Santana: Honey's son. He is only twelve but looks fourteen. Athletic, brave and very intelligent. He loves both his parents but does not believe they could get back together.
- Perry Skinner: Honey's ex-husband. Vice Mayor of Everglades City. A former marijuana smuggler turned crab fisherman. Strong, reliable, and handsome. Honey's obsessive behavior drove him away but he has never stopped loving her.
- Theodore Dealey: a private detective hired by Boyd's wife to follow him and Eugenie to Florida.
- Sammy Tigertail: a half-Seminole, half-white man in his 20s. After his father's death, he tried to re-invent himself as a true Native American, though he feels equally out of place in both worlds. He is saddened by his tribe's bloody history of victimization by the white man, though he has inherited his father's love for classic rock.
- Gillian St. Croix: a student at Florida State University. Her real last name is Tremaine. Outwardly shallow and sex-obsessed, she nonetheless yearns for true adventure and a meaningful relationship, and so is immune to most of the superficial influences that capture her girlfriends - hence her insistence on sticking with Sammy to the end.
- Louis Piejack: Honey's former boss, the owner of the fish market where she worked. A pervert and a wife beater, Piejack is obsessed with capturing Honey and making her his "obedient-homemaker-slash-sex-slave". After he gropes Honey's breast in the workplace, she applies a crab hammer to his testicles. When he finds out about it, Perry goes one better and hires two thugs to shove Piejack's offending hand into a crab trap. Due to a power outage at the emergency room, his fingers are re-attached in the wrong positions.
- Tommy Tigertail: Sammy's uncle, a prominent and wealthy member of the Seminole nation.

== Allusions to actual history, geography or persons ==
- There are repeated references to the Second Seminole War and its leading figures: Osceola, Thlocklo Tustenuggee, aka Chief Tiger Tail, Andrew Jackson, General Thomas Jesup, and Duncan Clinch. The great irony is pointed out that Jackson, the great enemy of the Seminole Nation, now adorns the $20 bills that the Nation rakes in from its casinos - as Tommy Tigertail says to Sammy, "it's better than spitting on the old bastard's grave."
- Sammy's pride in his Native American heritage was stoked by reading "The Seminole Indians of Florida," the 1884 report by Clay MacCauley to the Smithsonian Institution's Bureau of Ethnology.
- Many novels use fictitious locations, but Nature Girl does not. The author has presented real locations in south-west Florida as they would have been presented in a true story. Dismal Key exists and so do the many localities referred to in the Ten Thousand Islands area near Everglades City.
- Sammy and his Uncle Tommy are purported to be descendants of Chief Tigertail. Sammy assumes the alias "Thlocklo" ("Tiger Tail") during his retreat.
- Gillian's conservative parents are alarmed at the thought of her going to college in Tallahassee, after reading a tawdry story about "a prominent state legislator who put his favorite Hooters waitress on the state payroll". This is an oblique reference to Tom Feeney, formerly a U.S. Congressman and former Speaker of the Florida House, who was indeed ridiculed for appointing waitress Bridgette Gregory to a state administrative position despite her lack of a college degree or other qualifications for the job.
- Sammy's guitar, appropriated from the Seminole Nation's Hard Rock Café casino, once belonged to Mark Knopfler of Dire Straits, Sammy's father's favorite band.
- Theodore Dealey, the private investigator who makes a living shooting photos of unfaithful spouses, is based in Dallas, Texas. Dealey Plaza in Dallas was the site of John F. Kennedy's assassination in 1963. Kennedy was known as an unfaithful spouse, and the pictures of his shooting death are famous.

== Connections with Hiaasen's other works ==
- Tommy Tigertail, Sammy's uncle, makes his first appearance since Hiaasen's first novel, Tourist Season.
- Tommy also refers to the main antagonist of that novel, the eco-terrorist Skip Wiley.
- Fry mentions a friend of Honey's living in Chokoloskee named Bonnie that has "a solar powered sewing machine". This may refer to Bonnie Lamb, who moved to Chokoloskee with Augustine Herrera at the end of Stormy Weather.
- There is a humorous passage in Basket Case when the protagonist ruminates about the usefulness of GPS devices: while they are useful, they also allow complete morons to escape the consequences of their own stupidity — "to wander into the wilderness without any fear of getting lost.... So much for natural selection". There is a scene in Nature Girl in which Boyd, trying to signal a Coast Guard helicopter, yells into a GPS receiver, which he has mistaken for a radio. The fact that a GPS is incomprehensible to Boyd puts him on a rung below a complete moron.

== Critical reception ==
The New York Times wrote that "perhaps as compensation for its familiarity, Nature Girl is a bit too frantic in its plotting." Kirkus Reviews wrote: "For once, the characters are funnier than their exhaustingly unpredictable interactions. The result is less satire than usual from Hiaasen ... and more Rube Goldberg farce." Publishers Weekly called the book "another hilarious Florida romp." The Independent called it "an hysterical romp of crooks and tarts by a delectably deranged imagination."
