= Ten Thousand Islands National Wildlife Refuge =

United States National Wildlife Refuge in Florida

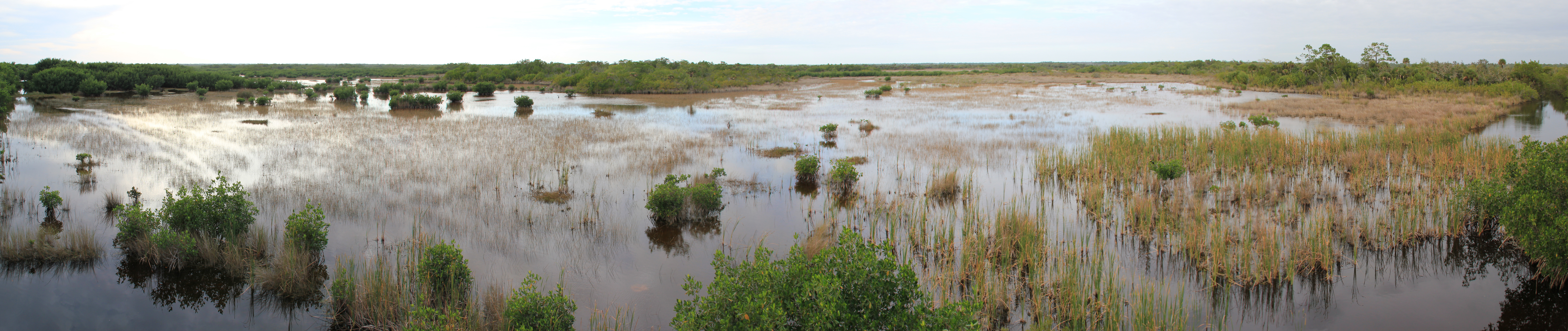
- Refuge in 2014
- Interactive map of Ten Thousand Islands National Wildlife Refuge
- Nearest city: Goodland, Florida
- Coordinates: 25.9236°N 81.564°W
- Area: 35,000 acres (140,000,000 m^{2})
- Established: 1996
- Governing body: US Fish & Wildlife Service
- Website: Ten Thousand Islands National Wildlife Refuge

The Ten Thousand Islands National Wildlife Refuge is located in Southwest Florida in Collier County, between Marco Island and Everglades City, Florida. The refuge was first established in 1996 and covers 35,000 acres of the Ten Thousand Islands. The refuge includes both fresh and saltwater, and protects a large area of mangrove forest.

Activities include fishing, hunting, bird watching, kayaking and camping.

The refuge is home to a wide variety of plants and animals. There are approximately 200 species of fish, 189 species of birds and innumerable plant species.

Mangroves
	Rhizophora mangle Red mangrove The red mangrove is the most dominant species of mangrove in Florida and can be found as a shrub or as tall trees. They produce many viviparous seedlings that fall from the mangrove.
	Avicennia germinans Black mangrove Black mangroves are very similar to the red mangroves in which they like to live in the most salt-rich soils. Pneumatophores extend from the soil and act as a root support system.
	Laguncularia racemosa White mangrove Unlike the red and black mangroves, the white mangrove usually grows on high, dryer land. The leaves of the white mangrove are different than the others because of its thick roundish leaves.

Grasses
	Spartina alterniflora Cordgrass Mostly found in marsh-like areas and is quite invasive. Too much of this type of grass tends to reduce the mud feeding habitats of the local shorebirds.
	Uniola paniculata Sea oats Usually found on sand dunes and very tolerant of salt spray, unlike most plants.

Exotic plants
	Schinus terebinthifolius Brazilian pepper, Florida holly, Christmas-berry or false pepper Reaches 12 meters high with intertwined branches. First introduced in the United States in 1898 by a plant explorer. The Brazilian pepper tree has taken over thousands of acres in south Florida and is rapidly growing.
	Melaleuca quinuenervia Melaleuca tree The melaleuca tree is becoming one of the most dominant invasive trees in south Florida. The reason they are so dangerous to South Florida is because they dry up areas that are supposed to be wet for most of the year.

Shore birds
	Sternula antillarum Least tern Is the smallest of the American terns and is found nesting on sandy shores of the southern parts of the United States. Small fish are the main staple in their diet.
	Rynchops niger Black skimmer They get their name by skimming the lower part of their beak in the water to catch small fish. They are commonly found in dense colonies on sandy beaches.

Mammals
	Procyon lotor Raccoon Raccoons are the main cause of loggerhead sea turtle nest depletion. Once these raccoons are removed from the smaller islands, the turtle nests tend to return.
	Lontra canadensis North American river otter River otters can mostly be found in rivers, marshes and swamps. They eat fish, amphibians, turtles and crayfish.
	Tursiops truncatus Bottlenose dolphin The bottlenose dolphin is the most common type of dolphin. They can be found from pelagic to coastal waters.

Reptiles
	Anolis sagrei Brown anole The brown anole is very invasive and reaches exceptionally high population densities. The brown anole seems to be taking over the green anole's habitats. The brown anoles have even been known to eat green anoles.
	Anolis carolinensis Green anole Green anoles feed on a variety of spiders, insects and other invertebrate. They can mostly be found living in trees.

Fishes
	Megalops atlanticus Tarpon Tarpon are usually found in coastal bays, estuaries and mangrove lined lagoons. They feed on a wide variety or animals: from mullet and sardines to crabs.
	Centropomus undecimalis Common snook Snook can be found inshore, around mangroves, bridges and seawalls. All snook are born males but when they become 18-22 inches in length some turn into females.
	Sciaenops ocellatus Red drum, redfish Red drum is named after the drumming sound they make during spawning. As juveniles, redfish stay in rivers and bay areas but as they grow older they start to move towards coastal areas and open water.
	Cynoscion nebulosus Spotted sea trout Spotted sea trout can be found around seagrass beds or oyster bars. Their main diet includes shrimp, pinfish or pigfish.

Threatened and endangered animals
	Trichechus manatus West Indian manatee The West Indian manatee has been considered endangered since 1967. Manatees migrate seasonally with the changing temperatures. They can be found in fresh, brackish or salt water.
	Haliaeetus leucocephalus Bald eagle The bald eagle has been the national emblem of the United States since 1782. They mostly feed on fish and other birds and can be found anywhere from rivers, lakes, marshes and coastal areas.
	Caretta caretta Atlantic loggerhead sea turtle The Atlantic loggerhead sea turtle is considered threatened. The population today is considered a fraction of what it used to be.
