= Shell works =

Complex constructions of mollusc shells

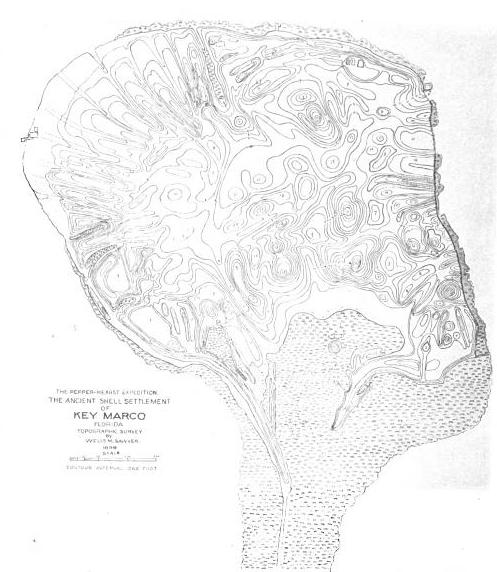
Contour map of the shell works at Key Marco.

Shell works are large and complex assemblages of shell found in southwest Florida. Shell works include mounds and other deposits, with features described as borrow pits, canals, causeways, cisterns, crescents, sunken plazas, ponds, ramps, raised platforms, ridges, rings, walls, and "water courts". The largest shell works were constructed during the Woodland period in southwest Florida, from Charlotte Harbor to the Ten Thousand Islands, including Estero Bay.

Shell works in southwest Florida often covered 20 acres (8.1 ha) to 125 acres (51 ha), with mounds 5 metres (16 ft) to 10 metres (33 ft) in height. In a survey of the Charlotte Harbor area, Frank Hamilton Cushing found over 75 artificial shell islands, ranging from .25 acres (0.10 ha) to 4 acres (1.6 ha) in area. Cushing also noted that Mound Key covered 128 acres (52 ha), and Chokoloskee Island was over .5 miles (0.80 km) in diameter, and up to 27 feet (8.2 m) high. Other large shell works include Pineland Archeological District, Dismal Key, Fakahatchee Key, and Russell Key.

The Turner River Site, on the Turner River (Florida) near Chokoloskee Island, is a shell works site that covers 40 acres (16 ha) and is .25 miles (0.40 km) long. It was the first site in the Ten Thousand Islands to be excavated by professional archaeologists. It was added to the National Register of Historic Places in 1978. The Mark Pardo Shellworks Site in Cayo Costa State Park near Bokeelia was added to the National Register of Historic Places in 1996.

In historic times villages and towns were located on some shell works sites. European accounts of encounters with the inhabitants of southwest Florida in the 16th and 17th centuries describe houses on top of mounds, and ceremonial use of different parts of shell works sites.

Archaeological investigation of shell works started in second half of the 19th century. Various interpretations of the sites as middens, monuments, burial mounds, or living platforms elevated above flood waters were offered. Some early archaeologists noted the complexity of the sites, especially as compared to simple mounds elsewhere in Florida.
