= Dismal Key =

- Dismal Key Dismal Key (the Caribbean)

Geography
- Location: Gulf of Mexico
- Coordinates: 25°53′22″N 81°33′07″W
- Archipelago: Ten Thousand Islands

Administration
- United States
- State: Florida
- County: Collier

Dismal Key is a small island, part of the Ten Thousand Islands archipelago in the Gulf of Mexico off the coast of Florida. The island is artificial, constructed by people of the Glades culture. Construction of the island proceeded in stages over some 1,500 years following the end of the Archaic period in Florida. Occupation probably ended a couple of centuries before the arrival of Europeans in Florida. Dismal Key was occupied by several hermits in the 20th century.

== Shell works ==
The southwest coast of Florida has many large artificial structures known as shell works, made of shells piled up by human activity. Shell works are found from Charlotte Harbor southward through the Ten Thousand Islands. Many of the shell works are surrounded by water, forming artificial islands, often called keys. The shell works were the sites of villages, occupied by people who depended primarily on fishing, but also hunted and gathered wild foods. Shells works have complex structures, apparently designed to separate spaces by use; domestic, public and sacred. The northern part of the range in which shell works are found, from Charlotte Harbor through Estero Bay, was occupied by people of the Caloosahatchee culture. The southern part of the range, including Marco Island and the Ten Thousand Islands, was occupied by people of the Ten Thousand Islands region of the Glades culture. Both the Caloosahatchee culture area and the Ten Thousand Islands region of the Glades culture area were occupied by the Calusa people at the time of first contact with Europeans. Archaeological evidence indicates that artifacts in the Ten Thousand Islands region changed from resembling those of the Glades culture to resembling those of the Caloosahatchee culture around 1300, indicating absorption by or strong influence from the Calusa. Schwadron notes that many of the shell works sites in the Ten Thousand Islands appear to have been abandoned shortly before 1300, and suggests that the people of those sites may have migrated into Calusa territory.

Dismal Key is about 30 hectares (74 acres) in size. The entire key above water consists of shell works, shells piled up by human activity, with various apparently designed features. The key is crescent shaped, and roughly bilaterally symmetric. The structure of the shell works on Dismal Key resembles that of other shell works in the Ten Thousand Islands, including Fakahatchee Key, Russell Key, Sandfly Key, Key Marco and Chokoloskee Island, suggesting a common plan.

=== Shell ring ===
A "c"-shaped shell ring of about 275 metres (902 ft) in width and up to 4 metres (13 ft) high is located in the open end of the shell works on Dismal Key. A central plaza about 50 metres (160 ft) across surrounds a deep pond. The opening in the ring faces northeast, away from the rest of the shell works. The ring is constructed of layers of clean, unbroken oyster shells mixed with layers of crushed oyster and other shells, with some fish bones. The ring appears to have been rapidly constructed in several episodes. The layers of crushed shell, which include possible post holes, may have been living floors. Artifacts found in the ring include ceramics, shell and bone tools, shark teeth, and sting ray spines. A chert flake was found (the nearest source of chert is 250 kilometres (160 mi) away). Fragments of human bone and a human tooth were found, but excavation was halted in the area to avoid further disturbing a potential grave site. Six shell samples from the ring yielded calibrated radiocarbon dates between 450 BCE and 50 BCE, very early in the Glades culture period. While the shell ring appears to have been a habitation site, 4 metres (13 ft) of shell were deposited in 150 years, and the ring is not just a midden. There is no evidence of human use of the shell ring after 50 BCE.

=== Shell fields ===
Relatively flat shell fields, of about 6.5 hectares (16 acres) in area, are in the interior of the shell works, separated from the shell ring by mangroves, with a series of mounds partly surrounding the shell fields. The shell fields have some very low ridges and shallow depressions and ponds. Schwadron suggests that the depressions may have been oyster roasting pits or the sites of structures. The shell fields consist primarily of small oyster shells with some conch and whelk shells, and many artifacts, including ceramics and shell tools. The base level of the shell fields consists of a mixture of broken and unbroken oyster shell, with no artifacts and very little soil. On top of the base is a very thin layer of crushed oyster shell, interpreted as an old ground surface. Possible post holes, now filled with soil, extend from this layer into the base layer. Above the old ground surface is a midden layer, consisting of oyster shells with about 20% soil mixed in, and ceramics and shell tools. The modern surface is a sandy loam. The ceramics are classified as late Glades I period, from 500 to 750. Two shell samples yielded calibrated radiocarbon dates of 400-580 and 450-620. This time period corresponds to that in which the shell fields at Fakahatchee Key were constructed.

A long (about 640 metres (2,100 ft)), narrow and relatively straight low shell ridge extends from the southeastern end of the island, running to the south of the shell ring. It is similar to a feature at Key Marco, and has been compared to a breakwater. The structure is composed of clean, unbroken oyster shells, with no artifacts. A shell sample yielded a calibrated radiocarbon date of 300 to 490

=== Mounds and ridges ===
Partially surrounding the shell fields is an arc of mounds, covering about 6 hectares (15 acres) Four of the mounds are 100 metres (330 ft) or more long, at least 30 metres (98 ft) wide, and 5 metres (16 ft) to 7.5 metres (25 ft) high. Flanking the large mounds are eight smaller mounds 3 metres (9.8 ft) to 4 metres (13 ft) tall. Three of the largest mounds are centrally located, with a canal leading between two of the tallest mounds. The second largest mound, 6 metres (20 ft) tall, is at the northern edge of the shell works. The tallest mound has a ramp to the shell fields. The third tallest mound has a ramp leading away from the shell fields, to a zone of shell ridges and "water courts". Shell samples from the tops of the largest mounds yielded calibrated radiocarbon dates of 580 to 860.

A dozen finger ridges, 20 metres (66 ft) to 40 metres (130 ft) wide and 60 metres (200 ft) to 70 metres (230 ft) m long, radiate out from the arc of mounds towards the water. The finger ridges are separated from each other by canals. Several of the finger ridges are associated with "water courts", depressions deep enough to retain water. Some may have stored rain water for drinking, while others, with a connection to open water, may have served as fish traps. The finger ridges are also constructed from clean, whole oyster shells, but are covered by a midden layer of black earth and shells with many artifacts and fish bones. Shell samples from the lower levels of the finger ridges yielded calibrated radiocarbon dates of 660 to 810, while samples from below the midden layer yielded dates of 990 to 1290. Some of the ceramics found in the midden layer are attributed the Glades IIIa period, 1200 to 1400. There is no evidence of occupation of Dismal Key after that period (until the 20th century).

== Hermits ==
Dismal Key has been inhabited by hermits at times during the 20th century. A house was built in the island around 1913. A cistern collecting rainfall from the roof of the house is the only regular source of fresh water on the island. Archaeologist Aleš Hrdlička found a settler named Gandeese on Dismal Key when he visited it in 1918. Eardley Foster Atkinson settled on Dismal Key in the early 1950s. After Atkinson's death, Al Seely moved to Dismal Key, and was living there in 1988. A hermit known only as Niranjan was living on Dismal Key in 1992. The island was unoccupied in 2003.

== In popular culture ==
Dismal Key is the locale for the second half of the novel Nature Girl by Carl Hiaasen.

A fictional airport on Dismal Key is the scene of episode 1 of the Finder television show.
