= Mark Pardo Shellworks Site =

- U.S. National Register of Historic Places
- Location within Florida Location within the United States
- Location: Lee County, Florida
- Nearest city: Bokeelia
- Coordinates: 26.70°N 82.16°W
- MPS: Archeological Resources of the Caloosahatchee Region MPS
- NRHP reference No.: 96000533
- Added to NRHP: May 21, 1996

The Mark Pardo Shellworks Site is an archaeological site west of Bokeelia, Florida. It is located along the eastern edge of Cayo Costa Island in Cayo Costa State Park. On May 21, 1996, it was added to the U.S. National Register of Historic Places.

The site has shell works, consisting of lines of shell deposits along the shore, and black dirt middens inland from the shells. There may also be features underwater in the adjacent black mangrove forest, dating to when the sea level was lower. The shell works are dominated by lightning whelk, with some horse conchs. Oyster, clam, conch and lightning whelk shells are also found in the middens. The shell works and middens are attributed to the Caloosahatchee culture IIA-IV period, about 500–1500. In 1992, the NRHP Registration Sheet described the Mark Pardo Shellworks as "one of the best preserved archaeological sites in the region." Since then, however, feral hogs have seriously damaged the site.
