= Josslyn Island Site =

Archaeological site in Florida, United States

- U.S. National Register of Historic Places
- Location within Florida Location within the United States
- Location: Lee County, Florida
- Nearest city: Fort Myers
- Coordinates: 26°37′31″N 82°9′9″W
- MPS: Archeological Resources of the Caloosahatchee Region MPS
- NRHP reference No.: 78000948
- Added to NRHP: December 14, 1978

The Josslyn Island Site is an archaeological site composed of a shell mound in Lee County, Florida, United States.

In mid-1983, the shell mound was cleared and mapped by archaeologists from the Southwest Florida Archaeological Society, operating with funds donated by Don Randell, the owner. It was revealed to cover an area of approximately 4 hectares (9.9 acres), and some parts of the mound reached a height of more than 5 metres (16 ft). Most of the shells in the mound are those of whelks and conchs; noticeably absent are oyster and clam shells. Although the dates of the shells are unknown, they are believed to have been deposited by Calusa peoples during or soon before European contact.

The mound has only rarely been visited since the beginning of the twentieth century; except for a few non-archaeologists who attempted to excavate the site, the 1983 survey was the first known human visit since the site was recorded in 1896. Seeing the high state of preservation in which the Josslyn Island Shell Mound exists, researchers have proposed that it may hold significant stores of knowledge about its creators. In recognition of its archaeological value, the site was listed on the National Register of Historic Places in 1978. It is one of eight Lee County archaeological sites to be included on the Register.
