= Galt Island Archeological District =

Archaeological site in Florida, United States

- U.S. National Register of Historic Places
- U.S. Historic district
- Location within Florida Location within the United States
- Location: Lee County, Florida
- Nearest city: St. James City
- Coordinates: 26°30′58″N 82°06′23″W
- Area: 250 acres (1.0 km^{2})
- MPS: Archeological Resources of the Caloosahatchee Region MPS
- NRHP reference No.: 96000531
- Added to NRHP: May 21, 1996

The Galt Island Archeological District (also known as the Galt Island Shell Midden or Galt Island Burial Mound) is a U.S. historic district (designated as such on May 21, 1996) located on Galt Island, near St. James City, Florida.
