= Ten Thousand Islands =

Chain of islands in Florida, USA

Ten Thousand Islands National Wildlife Refuge
- IUCN category IV (habitat/species management area)
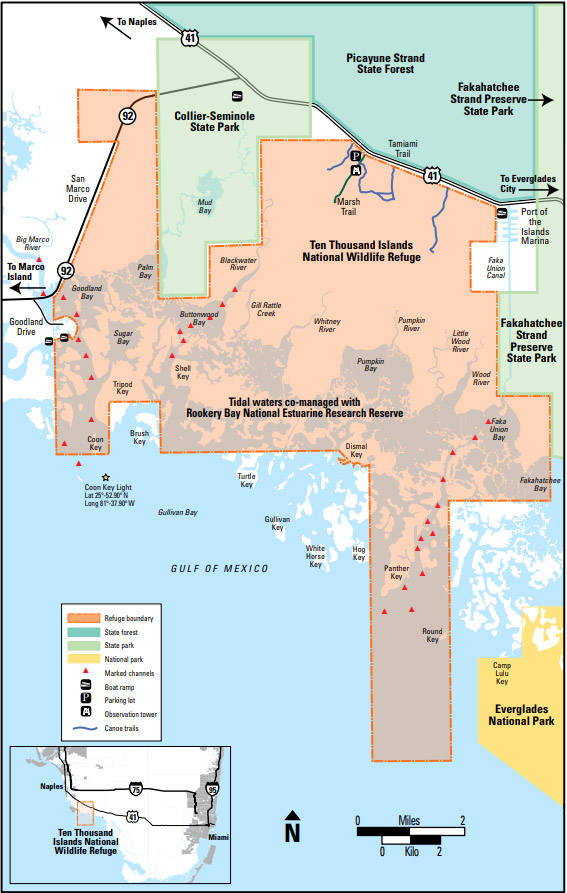
- Ten Thousand Islands by U.S. Fish & Wildlife Service

- Location within Florida
- Location: Collier County, Monroe County, Florida, United States
- Nearest city: Goodland, Florida
- Coordinates: 25°51′N 81°30′W
- Area: 35,000 acres (140 km^{2})
- Established: 1996
- Governing body: U.S. Fish and Wildlife Service
- Website: www.fws.gov/floridapanther/TenThousandIslands/

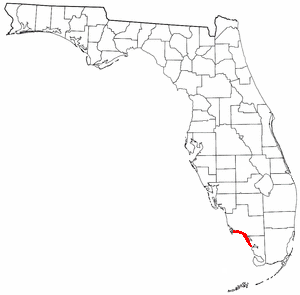
The Ten Thousand Islands are located near the south end of the Florida peninsula on the Gulf Coast, west of the Everglades

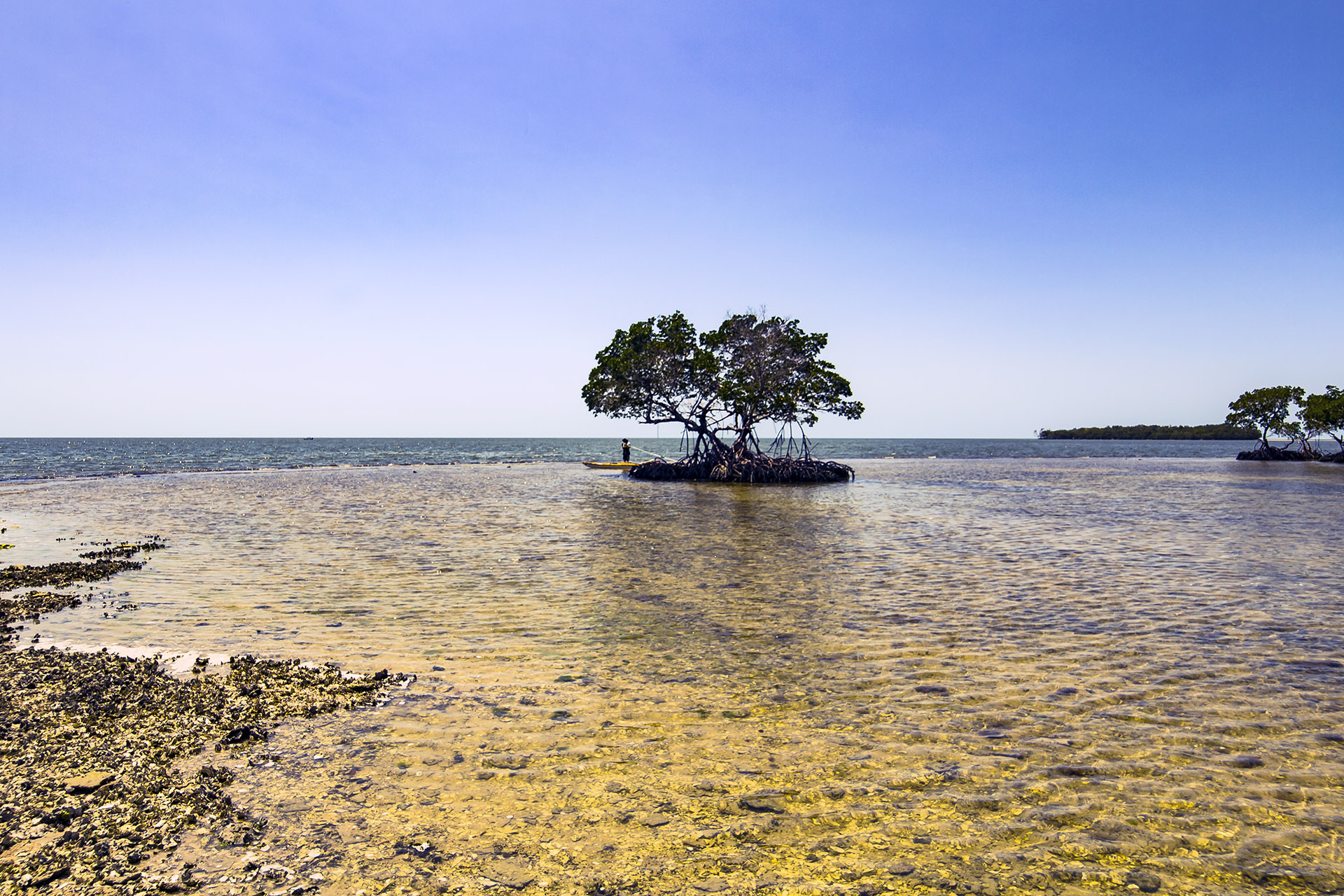
Indian Key Pass - Ten Thousand Islands

The Ten Thousand Islands are a chain of islands and mangrove islets off the coast of southwest Florida, between Cape Romano (at the south end of Marco Island) and the mouth of the Lostmans River. Some of the islands are high spots on a submergent coastline. Others were produced by mangroves growing on oyster bars. Despite the name, the islets in the chain only number in the hundreds.

== Geography ==
The northern part of the Ten Thousand Islands, between Cape Romano and Everglades City, is in the Ten Thousand Islands National Wildlife Refuge. The southern part of the Ten Thousands Islands, south of Everglades City, is in Everglades National Park. The 99-mile-long (159 km) Wilderness Waterway begins at Everglades City and ends at Flamingo at the southern tip of the Florida peninsula. Administrative control of the islands is split between Collier County and Monroe County.

== Archaeology ==
The Ten Thousand Islands were used and occupied by Native Americans for thousands of years. Evidence of former living sites can be found under as much as four feet (1.2 m) of water. A number of shell rings and other shell complexes have been identified in or adjacent to the Ten Thousand Islands. The Horr's Island archaeological site at the northern end of the Ten Thousand Islands was occupied year-round 3,500 years ago, and other sites are presumed to have been inundated by a rise in sea level. The material culture of the Native Americans living in the Ten Thousand Islands was distinctive enough to be classified as, at least, a sub-area of the Glades culture area.

== Demography ==
Almost all of the Ten Thousand Islands are currently uninhabited. The largest, Chokoloskee Island, which is connected to Everglades City by a causeway, has about 400 permanent residents. Other islands have been sporadically inhabited in the 19th and 20th centuries by individuals or families.

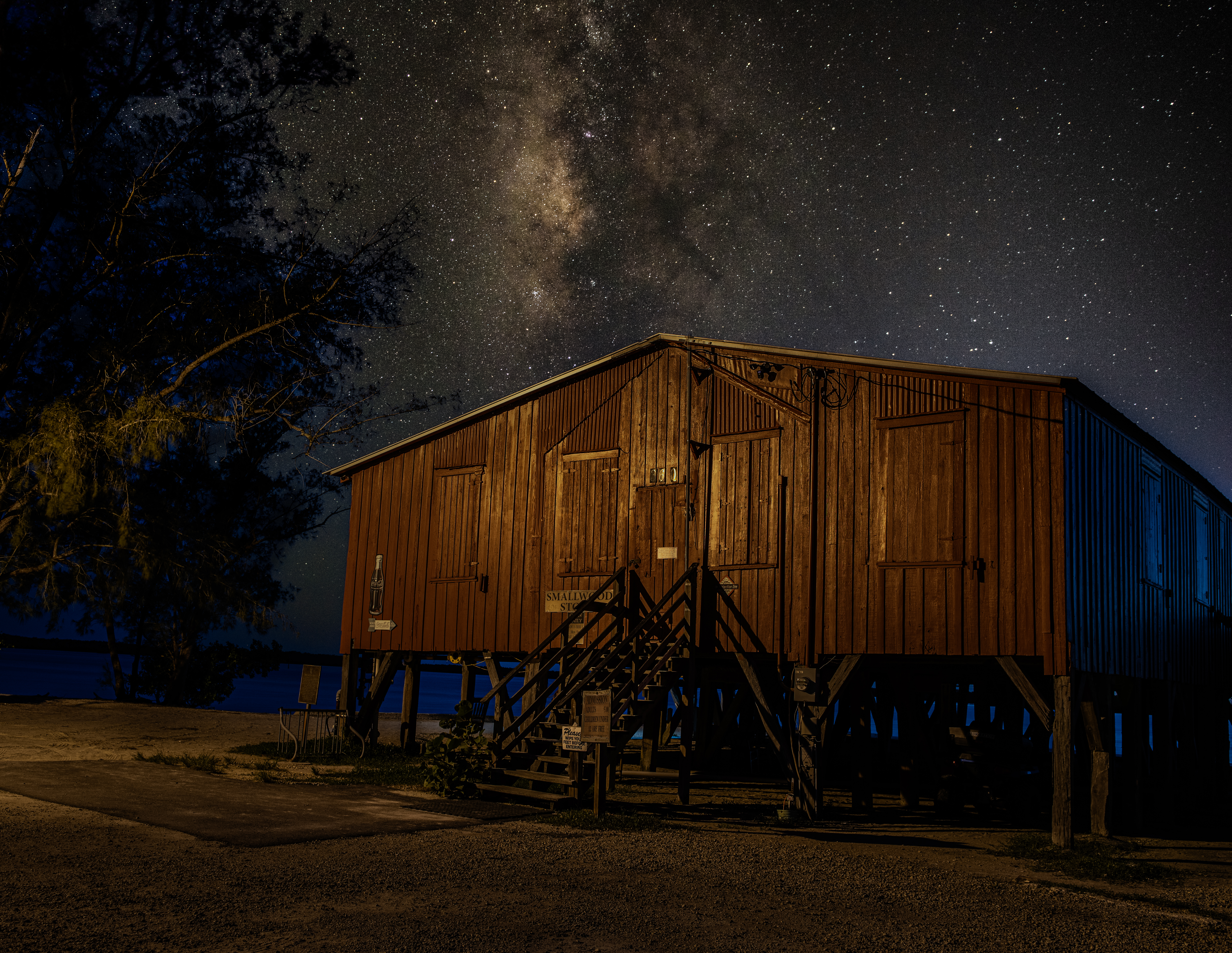
Ted Smallwood Store on Chokoloskee Island

== Recreation ==
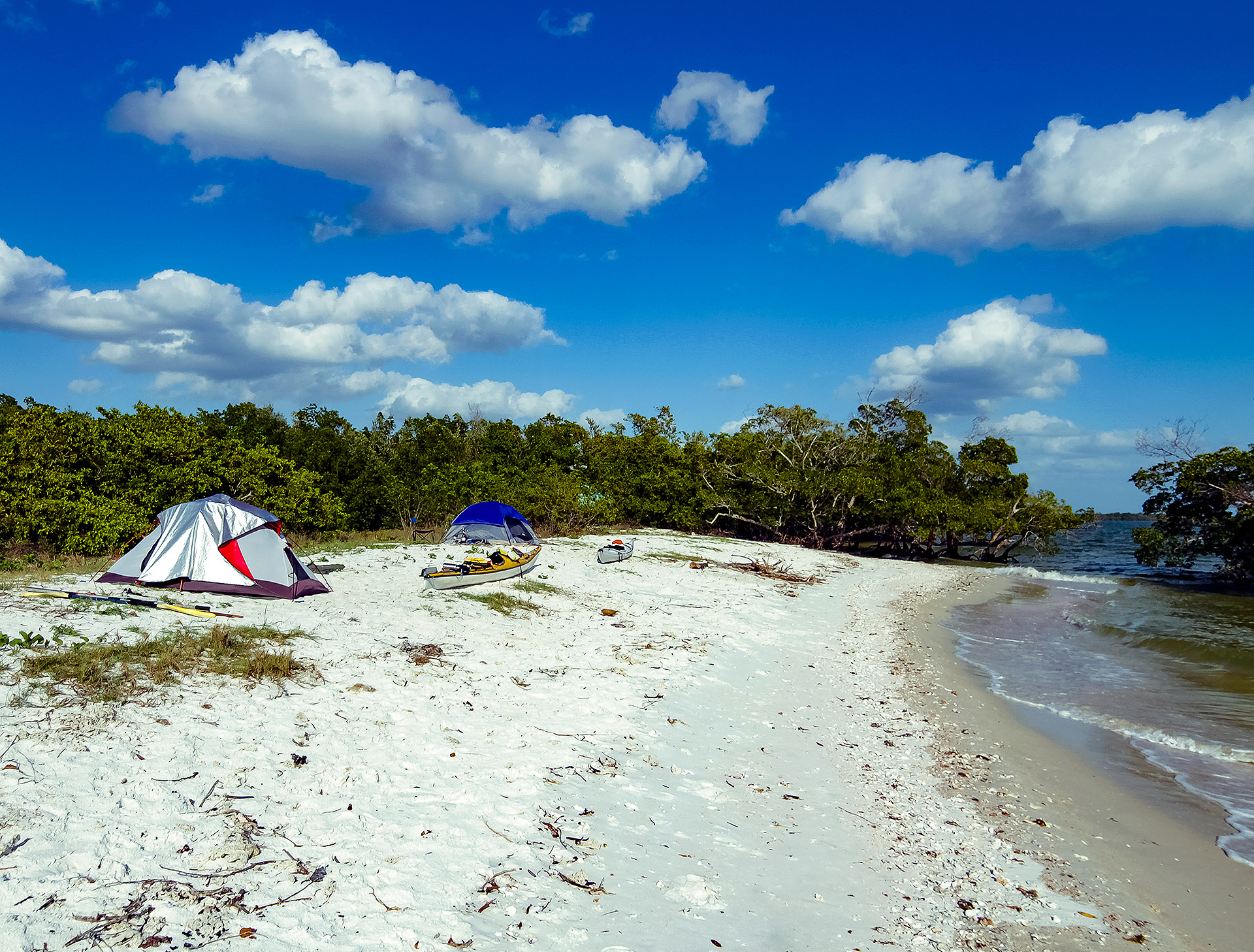
Camping site at Camp LuLu Key

Some of the Ten Thousand Islands are suitable for overnight visits, as dictated by the United States Fish and Wildlife Service. Camping is allowed only October through April and only on the outer barrier islands. Since this is a wilderness area where wind, weather and lack of fresh water can become threatening, the Wildlife Service recommends only seasoned canoeists and sea kayakers attempt the trip.

Part of the archipelago lies within Everglades National Park. The following islands are officially designated camping sites:

- Hog Key
- Turkey Key
- New Turkey Key
- Mormon Key
- Pavilion Key
- Rabbit Key
- Jewel Key
- Picnic Key
- Tiger Key

=== Dark skies recreation ===
The Ten Thousand Islands archipelago contains several dark skies sites along the Southwest Florida coast, including Pavilion Key, which lies 11 miles south of Everglades City and lacks any urban development to the south of it. The dark skies and low south latitude makes the area suitable for stargazing and Milky Way astrophotography.

== See also ==
- Rookery Bay National Estuarine Research Reserve
- Dismal Key
