= Written in the Sand =

Written in the Sand may refer to:

- Written in the Sand, a 1996 album by The Michael Schenker Group
- "Written in the Sand", a 1996 song by The Michael Schenker Group from the album of the same name
- "Written in the Sand", a 2017 song by American country music group Old Dominion
- "Written in the Sand", a 2011 song by Birdy Nam Nam from the album Defiant Order
- "Written in the Sand", the Philippine entry for the BBC television special 2000 Today sung by Regine Velasquez
- Written in the Sand, a 1912 novel by G. R. Duval
- Written in the Sand (film), a 2025 American romantic film
