= Wayne White =

Wayne White could refer to:

- Wayne White (artist) (born 1957), American artist, art director, puppeteer, set designer, animator, cartoonist and illustrator
- Wayne White (cricketer) (born 1985), English former cricketer

== See also ==
- Randy Wayne White (born 1950), American crime fiction writer
