= Mud Hole Spring =

Mud Hole Spring is an unusual warm-water, submarine discharge of water off the southwestern Gulf Coast of Florida, at 26°15′51″N 82°01′02″W, approximately 18.5 kilometres (11.5 mi) south of the Sanibel Island Light and Lee County, Florida. It discharges geothermally warmed and turbid water from the sea floor.

The submarine feature is named "Mud Hole" because it produces a muddy plume of turbid water. The water is warm and rich in minerals. The warm water and abundant minerals create and support a lively submarine ecosystem.

== Characteristics ==
- A dominant feature of Mud Hole is a submarine sinkhole depression which ejects water.
- A surface-level turbidity plume of approximately 1 km. in diameter
- The spring vent has been measured approximately 61m in diameter and approximately 19m below NGVD.

Water emanating from the spring vent disturbs fine sea-floor sediment. The sediment in this region is composed of fine gray silt and mud. These materials are disturbed by the flow of water and create clouds of suspended sediment (Turbidity). A turbidity plume with a diameter of approximately 1 km. is visible from the sea surface.

Water produced from the spring vent is warmer than the surrounding sea temperature.

Water Body	Average Temperature
Surrounding Sea Water	21 °C
Spring Water Discharge	35 °C
Upper Floridian Aquifer	26-29 °C

Temperature variations between the water bodies suggest the water is being heated from natural submarine forces. It's uncertain whether heating is due to geothermal forces, or hot water migrating from deep faults. Regardless, the Mud Hole site is a unique and important submarine feature which may allow us to have a greater understanding of the Gulf of Mexico seafloor ecosystem, and the impact of sustained nutrient and mineral rich freshwater discharge on the sea floor.

== Site significance ==
=== Evidence of geothermal convective flow ===
Mud Hole Spring has been described as "Field evidence of a geothermally activated convective flow cell" underlying the Florida Platform."

Florida Springs discharge groundwater from the Floridian Aquifer. Groundwater might remain underground for a period of time, ranging from days to decades. Because the Floridian Platform is composed primarily of porous limestone karst, it is uniquely susceptible to groundwater pollution leeching. Groundwater that emerges from Florida's springs are a vital indicator of the health of the underlying Floridian Aquifer. Like all Floridian Springs, the Mud Hole submarine Spring Boil is significant for spring-watchers because it represents a spring discharge on the perimeter boundary of the Florida Platform and Floridian Aquifer, discharging into the Gulf of Mexico.

=== Red tide in the Gulf of Mexico ===
Spring discharge, along with groundwater runoff, is a primary transmission vector for nitrate pollution. The discharge of potentially nitrate-ridden fresh water from the Florida Aquifer into the warm waters of the Gulf of Mexico creates a breeding ground for algal blooms, including the notorious Red Tide algae species Karenia brevis.

These increases in groundwater nitrate concentrations are not only a threat to drinking water supplies for humans but are also polluting surface waters where high-nitrogen artesian water discharges from springs. Springs that evolved over tens of thousands of years with a nitrate concentration of less than 0.05 parts per million (mg/L) are now experiencing a 1,500 to 20,000 percent increase in the concentration of this macronutrient, accompanied by the loss of native submerged aquatic vegetation and the excessive growth of filamentous algae. Even if all human-controlled nitrogen pollution sources were stopped today, nitrate nitrogen pollution in the Floridan aquifer and in our springs will take years to decades to reverse.

The Mud Hole submarine discharge vent is a significant research site because its warm, mineral rich fresh water discharge provides a sustained, consistent site of deep-water upwelling in the Gulf of Mexico. The upwelling carries nutrients, mineral and fresh water to the sea surface.

Karst springs occur both onshore and offshore in Florida. Little is currently known about the offshore springs with the exception of the Spring Creek Group of springs - the largest spring in Florida (more than one billion gallons of water discharged per day) (Lane, 2001). In order to better understand the water resources of the state, the FGS has initiated a program to investigate the occurrence, discharge and water quality of the offshore springs.

=== Fresh water effect on Gulf of Mexico weather patterns ===
Although unconfirmed, there is speculation that the discharge of fresh water in the Gulf of Mexico may influence Gulf of Mexico weather patterns, especially the intensification of hurricane and tropical storm formation.

Recent research has observed a "Lens-Effect" which acts as a magnifying glass and may stoke excessive heat into upper levels of sea water, providing energy. Existing research focuses on river-mouth discharge, but the findings may have implications for offshore freshwater submarine vent discharge areas, as well. It is possible that submarine vent discharge sites like Mud Hole may introduce sufficient quantities of fresh water to affect surrounding tropical weather conditions.

== Ecological significance of site ==
Patches of the Gulf of Mexico seafloor are barren and devoid of marine life. This is partly because of the Gulf of Mexico Dead Zone, and also because marine life is attracted to underwater features. A sea-floor devoid of structure, protection, nutrients or other attractive features is often also devoid of marine life. By contrast, submarine hydrothermal vents and seeps, like the Mud Hole Spring discharge, can foster and support a thriving submarine ecosystem by introducing novel sources of nutrients and minerals. Researchers have studied deep-sea habitats and local submarine ecosystems in the Gulf of Mexico, with particular focus on geothermal vents like the Mud Hole Submarine Spring, and other features in the West Florida Escarpment.

=== Geothermal marine ecosystems ===
Marine ecosystems thrive around submarine geothermal features like the vents, seeps and Mud Hole discharge location. The following fauna are known to thrive around Mud Hole Spring:

- Large fish
- Sharks
- Turtles
  - The Mud Hole is one of two important foraging sites for loggerhead turtles in the Gulf of Mexico.

=== Loggerhead turtle habitat ===
"There are several features in the northern half of the GOM that could concentrate prey species and attract an unusually dense aggregation of foraging loggerheads. These are the Flower Garden Banks (FGB, on the Texas–Louisiana continental shelf southeast of Galveston), the Florida Middle Grounds (FMG, on the northwestern portion of the WFS), and the Mud Hole Submarine Springs (MHSS, on the southeastern portion of the WFS; see Breland 1980; Fanning et al. 1981; Saleem 2007). These features are at depths typical of loggerhead foraging sites (<100 m), have irregular submarine terrain with sand or sand–gravel substrates, and have limestone escarpments or coral banks of various sizes."

=== Fishing and scuba communities ===
The area is well known to local and sport fishermen, and scuba divers. The location of submarine spring discharge sites like Mud Hole are often closely guarded by members of the fishing community.

== Discovery ==
The Mud Hole Spring was first discovered by researchers in 1979 by using satellite imaging and analysis techniques.

Discovery was made by analyzing data from a Nasa aircraft reconnaissance overflight in 1966 using infrared sensor technology. Data analysis revealed a sea surface temperature anomaly, suggesting the upwelling of thermally heated groundwater. 63 feet below sea level. Turbidity plume one km in diameter.

Well before official discovery the Mud Hole Spring site was well known to local fishermen as a gathering place for marine life and activity. Local fishermen gave the name "mud hole" Upwelling phenomena may contribute to Red Tide plankton bloom events, which occur in this area.

Fanning et al. (1981) described four techniques used to find the springs. These include: use of sonar depth profiling, observation of turbid plumes in overlying waters, use of side-scan sonar, and observation of large sea turtles. Positive identification of heated effluent was obtained by SCUBA divers with hand-held thermometers, or when conditions were risky and visibility low, probe temperatures were lowered from the surface to the bottom. After seven survey cruises between December 1977 and March 1980, six depressions were found which contained either warmed sea water, vents discharging heated effluent, or both (Table 4).

=== Existing Mud Hole research ===
Mud Hole has been the subject of intense research, primarily conducted by NOAA, the USGS and various Florida universities and researchers. Two of the most in-depth research endeavors were conducted by University of South Florida researcher Shihadah M. Saleem, and then later in 2009 by Mitchell-Tapping et al. in 2009.

=== Geothermal-spring system ===
The Mud Hole site is part of a series of submarine vents and thermal springs which produce "warm, chemically altered seawater from vents and seepage zones. The spring water apparently originates in the subsurface ocean around the Florida Platform and penetrates the highly porous strata of the platform about 500–1000 meters below sea level. It percolates toward the interior of the platform and is geothermal heated to about 40°C en route." The Mud Hole Submarine Discharge Zone is sometimes referred to as "Mud Boil".

It is a significant feature for submarine research in the Gulf of Mexico for many reasons. Like marine seeps and vents, it provides an important source of live-giving nutrients and minerals for chemosynthetic communities.

=== Other spring sites studied ===
- Rusty Springs Depression
- Sinister Spring Depression
- Spring #3
- New Spring
- Dormant Spring
