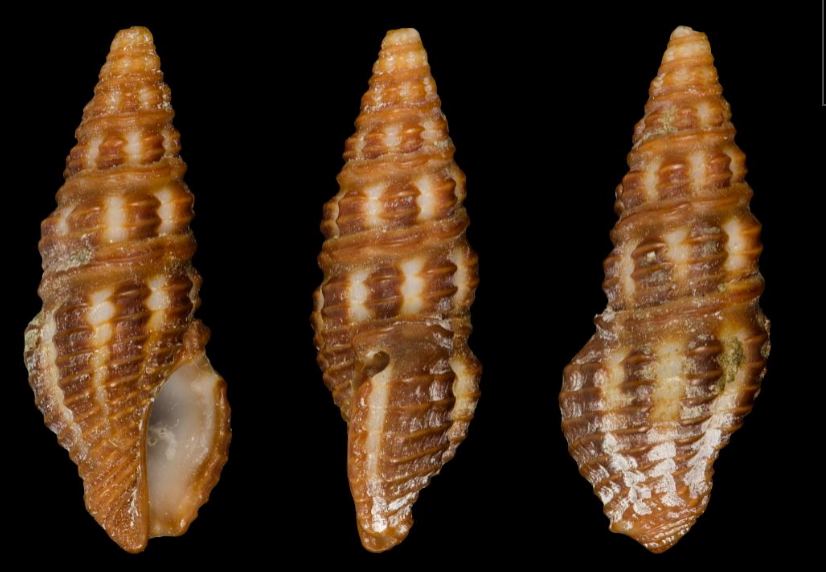
- Shell of Crassispira sanibelensis (holotype at the Smithsonian Institution)

Scientific classification
- Kingdom: Animalia
- Phylum: Mollusca
- Class: Gastropoda
- Subclass: Caenogastropoda
- Order: Neogastropoda
- Superfamily: Conoidea
- Family: Pseudomelatomidae
- Genus: Crassispira
- Species: C. sanibelensis

Binomial name
- Crassispira sanibelensis Ryall, Horro & Rolan, 2009

Synonyms
- Crassispira (Crassispirella) sanibelensis Bartsch & Rehder, 1939 (original combination)

= Crassispira sanibelensis =

Species of gastropod

Crassispira sanibelensis, common name the Sanibel turrid, is a species of sea snail, a marine gastropod mollusk in the family Pseudomelatomidae.

== Description ==
The length of the shell attains 29 mm.

== Distribution ==
This marine species occurs off Western Florida (Sanibel Island), United States and off the Bahamas.
