= River, Estuary and Coastal Observing Network =

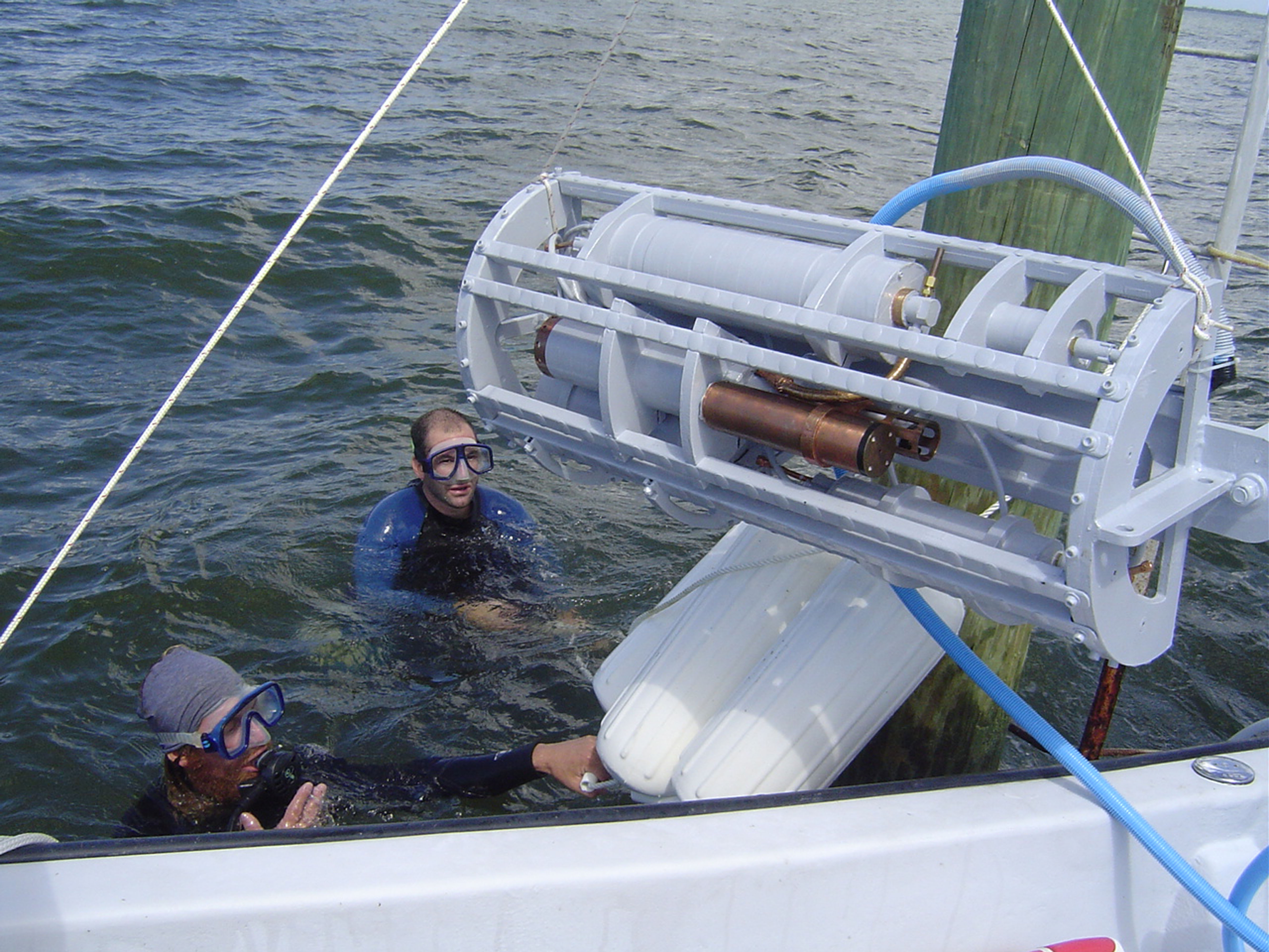
Instrument package (LOBO, Satlantic, Inc., Halifax) treated with e-paint, copper foil and copper cladding to prevent colonization by barnacles and other sessile animals.

The River, Estuary, and Coastal Observing Network (RECON) is a pioneering waterway observing system founded and maintained by Sanibel-Captiva Conservation Foundation (SCCF) operated by the SCCF's Marine Laboratory at Tarpon Bay, Sanibel, Florida.

RECON is funded primarily by private donations to SCCF's Marine Laboratory. Seven fixed locations stream water quality data from in situ Satlantic instrument packages. The sensor array includes a chemical-free nitrate sensor (ISUS), a CTD (conductivity, temperature, and depth) and fluorometer package for depth, turbidity, temperature, dissolved oxygen, salinity, and chlorophyll a fitted with a bleach injection system (WETLabs, Water Quality Monitor), and a CDOM fluorometer. One of the stations also incorporates a Nortek Aquadopp 2-dimensional current profiler sampling at 1 MHz for flow measurements. Data are currently collected hourly and transmitted in near-real time via cellular modems to a dedicated SQL database and can be viewed also in near real-time and plotted at RECON's website.

Extensive field testing by SCCF has led also to several innovative modifications to improve duration and robustness of these instruments. These include a non-toxic exterior anti-fouling paint, copper foil applied to all connectors and cables, and a custom designed support structure to attach to existing pilings. Other enhancements include a user-friendly website designed for scientists, decision-makers and the general public. Information disseminated through the website includes concise definitions of water quality parameters measured and how to interpret trends in water quality at high resolution. To maintain data quality control, water samples are collected to validate instrument settings and readings with traditional wet-chemistry methods. Water samples are analyzed by a state-certified Florida Department of Environmental Protection laboratory in Tallahassee, FL. SCCF plans to maintain the observing systems for the next three years or more, depending on funding.
