= Sanibel, Florida =

- City
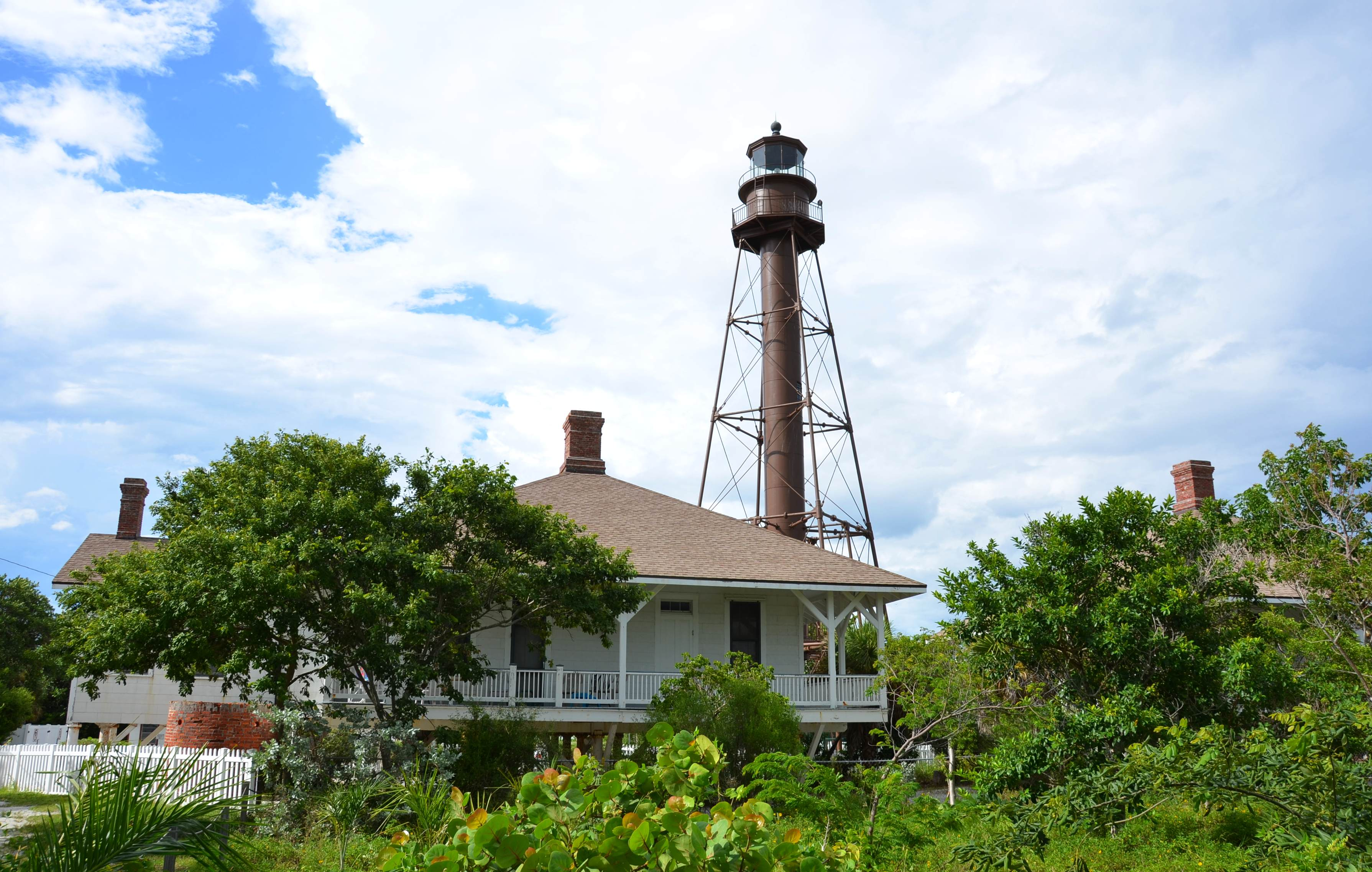
- Sanibel Island Lighthouse

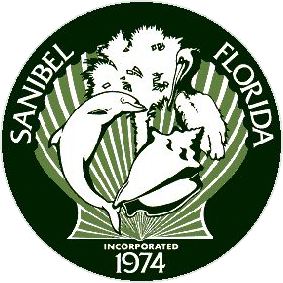
- Seal
- Motto: "A Barrier Island Sanctuary"
- Location in Lee County, Florida
- Coordinates: 26°28′23″N 82°08′50″W
- Country: United States
- State: Florida
- County: Lee
- Settled: 1832-1884
- Incorporated: 1974

Government
  - Type: Council-Manager
  - Mayor: Mike Miller (March 18, 2025 to present)
  - Vice Mayor: John Henshaw
  - Council Members: Mike Miller; John Henshaw, Laura DeBruce, Richard Johnson, Holly Smith
  - City Manager: Dana Souza
  - City Clerk: Scotty Lynn Kelly, MMC

Area
  - Total: 33.21 sq mi (86.01 km^{2})
  - Land: 16.18 sq mi (41.90 km^{2})
  - Water: 17.03 sq mi (44.10 km^{2}) 48.13%
- Elevation: 0 ft (0 m)

Population (2020)
  - Total: 6,382
  - Density: 394/sq mi (152.3/km^{2})
- Time zone: UTC-5 (Eastern (EST))
  - Summer (DST): UTC-4 (EDT)
- ZIP code: 33957
- Area code: 239
- FIPS code: 12-63700
- GNIS feature ID: 2405420
- Website: City of Sanibel Florida website

Sanibel is an island and city in Lee County, Florida, United States. Its population was 6,382 at the 2020 census, down from 6,469 at the 2010 census. It is part of the Cape Coral-Fort Myers, Florida metropolitan statistical area. The island, also known as Sanibel Island, constitutes the entire city. It is a barrier island—a collection of sand on the leeward side of the more solid coral-rock of Pine Island.

Most of the city proper is at the island's eastern end. After the Sanibel Causeway was built to replace the ferry in 1963, the city was incorporated in 1974, and the residents asserted control over development by establishing the Sanibel Comprehensive Land Use Plan, helping maintain a balance between development and preservation of the island's ecology. In September 2022, the causeway was heavily damaged by Hurricane Ian.

Due to easy causeway access, Sanibel is a popular tourist destination known for its shell beaches and wildlife refuges. More than half the island is made up of wildlife refuges, the largest being J. N. "Ding" Darling National Wildlife Refuge. The island hosts the Sanibel Historical Village and a variety of other museums, including the Bailey-Matthews National Shell Museum.

== History ==
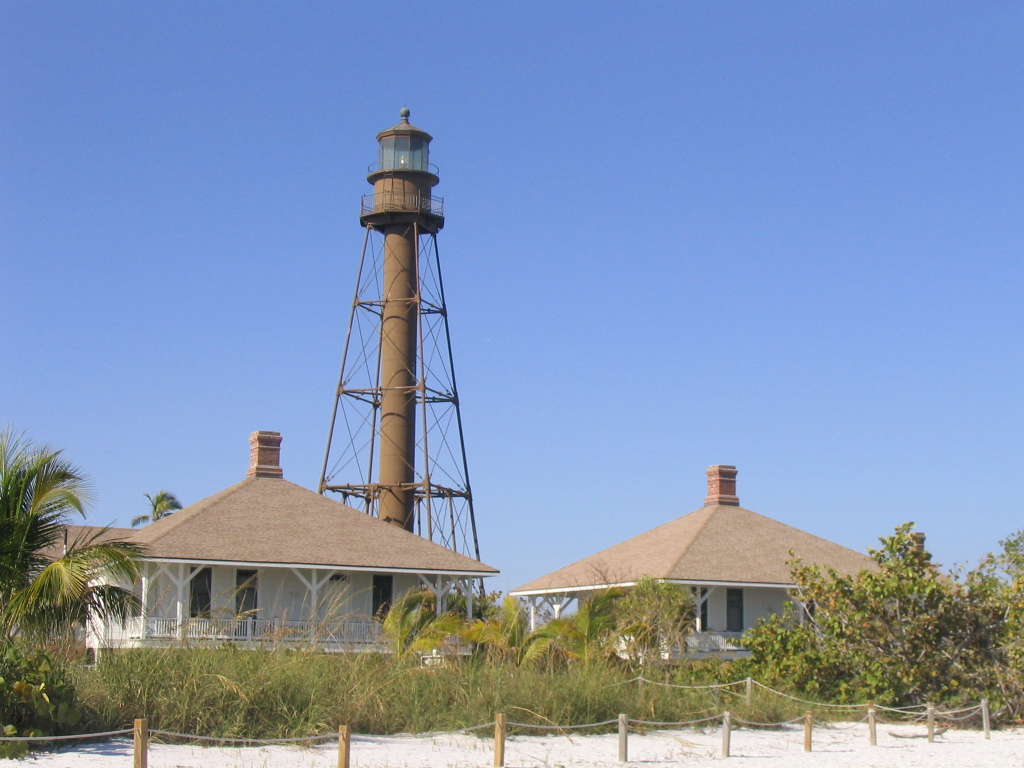
View of the lighthouse at the southern tip of Sanibel Island

Sanibel and Captiva formed as one island about 6,000 years ago. The first known humans in the area were the Calusa, who arrived about 2,500 years ago. The Calusa were a powerful Indian nation who came to dominate most of Southwest Florida through trade via their elaborate system of canals and waterways. Sanibel remained an important Calusa settlement until the collapse of their empire, soon after the arrival of the Europeans.

During the 1700s, Cuban fishermen seasonally traveled from their homes and set up fishing camps along the Gulf Coast, called ranchos, including on Sanibel Island.

In 1765, the first known appearance of a harbor on Sanibel is shown on a map as Puerto de S. Nibel (the "v" and "b" being interchangeable); thus, the name may have evolved from "San Nibel". Alternatively, the name may derive, as many believe, from "(Santa) Ybel", which survives in the old placename "Point Ybel", where the Sanibel Island Light is. How it would have gotten this name, however, is a matter of conjecture. One story says it was named by Juan Ponce de León for Queen Isabella I of Castile or the saint whose name she shares. Another attributes the name to Roderigo Lopez, the first mate of José Gaspar (Gasparilla), after his beautiful lover Sanibel whom he had left behind in Spain, but like most of the lore surrounding Gasparilla, this story is apocryphal, as the above references to recognizable variants of the name antedate the buccaneer's supposed reign.

Sanibel is not the only island in the area to figure prominently in the legends of Gaspar; Captiva, Useppa, and Gasparilla are also connected. Sanibel also appears in another tale, involving Gaspar's ally-turned-rival Black Caesar, said to have been a former Haitian slave who escaped during the Haitian Revolution to become a pirate. According to folklore, Black Caesar came to the Gulf of Mexico during the War of 1812 to avoid interference from the British. In the Gulf he befriended Gasparilla, who allowed him to establish himself on Sanibel Island. Eventually the old Spaniard discovered Caesar had been stealing from him and chased him off, but not before his loot had been buried.

In 1832, the Florida Peninsular Land Company established a settlement on Sanibel (then spelled "Sanybel"), but the colony never took off, and was abandoned by 1849. This group initially petitioned for a lighthouse on the island. The island was repopulated after the implementation of the Homestead Act in 1862, and again a lighthouse was petitioned. Construction of the Sanibel Island Lighthouse was completed in 1884, but the community remained small.

In May 1963, a causeway linking Sanibel and Captiva to the mainland opened, resulting in an explosion of growth. The City of Sanibel passed new restrictions on development after it was incorporated; developers challenged them to no avail. The island's only buildings taller than two stories antedate 1974, and no fast-food or chain restaurants are allowed on the island except for two that were there before the laws were enacted. A new causeway was completed in 2007; it replaced the worn-out 1963 spans, which were not designed to carry heavy loads or large numbers of vehicles. The new bridge features a "flyover" span tall enough for sailboats to pass under, replacing the old bridge's bascule drawbridge span. The original bridge was demolished and its remains were sunk into the water to create artificial reefs in the Gulf of Mexico.

=== Development ===
The main town is on the island's eastern end. The city was formed in 1974, as a direct result of the main causeway being built in 1963 to replace the ferry, and the rampant construction and development that followed. Developers sued over the new restrictions, but the city and citizens prevailed in their quest to protect the island. The only buildings above two to three stories on the island were built during that period.

A short bridge over Blind Pass links Sanibel to Captiva Island. More than half of areas of the two islands are preserved in their natural state as wildlife refuges. Visitors can drive, walk, bike, or kayak through the J. N. "Ding" Darling National Wildlife Refuge The island's most famous landmark, the Sanibel Lighthouse, is at its eastern end, adjacent to the fishing pier. The main thoroughfare, Periwinkle Way, is where most of Sanibel's stores and restaurants are, while the Gulf Drives (East, Middle, and West) have most of the accommodations.

The Sanibel-Captiva Conservation Foundation, a nonprofit organization, has been a key player in curbing commercial growth and development on the island. Since 1967, it has been dedicated to preserving natural resources on and around Sanibel and Captiva and has led efforts to acquire and preserve environmentally sensitive land on the islands, including critical wildlife habitats, rare and unique subtropical plant communities, tidal wetlands, and freshwater wetlands along the Sanibel River.

The Wall Street Journal selected Sanibel and Captiva Islands as one of the 10 Best Places for Second Homes in 2010.

== Geography ==
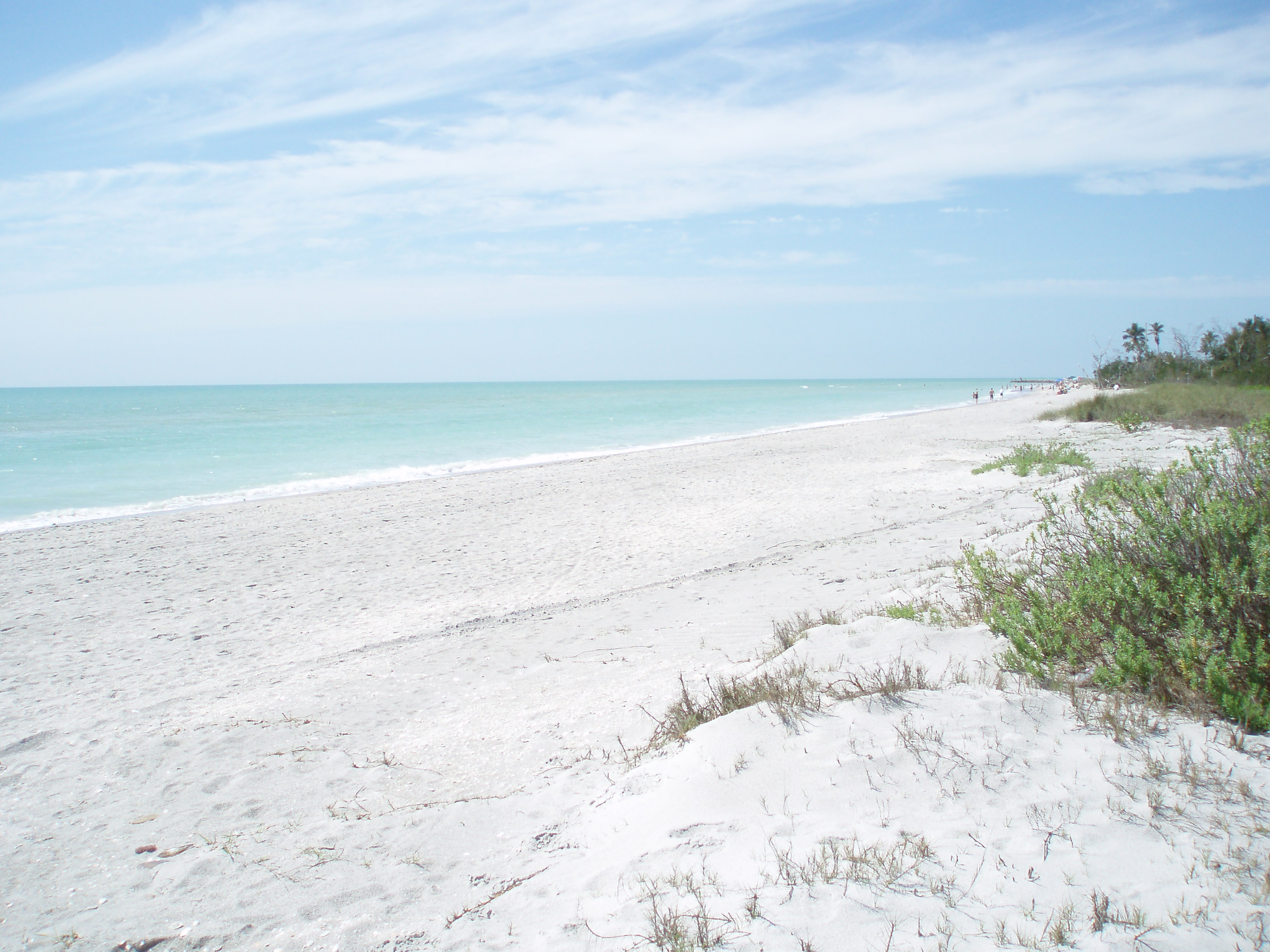
Beach near the western end of Sanibel

According to the United States Census Bureau, the city has an area of 33.16 square miles (85.9 km^{2}), of which 17.21 square miles (44.6 km^{2}) are land and 15.96 square miles (41.3 km^{2}) (48.13%) are covered by water.

=== Climate ===
Sanibel Island, in southern Florida, has a tropical climate, with daily high temperatures ranging from 75 °F (24 °C) in midwinter to around 90 °F (32 °C) in the summer. The months of January through April (peak tourist season on the island) have the coolest temperatures, ranging from 75 °F (24 °C) during the day to a cool 55 °F (13 °C) at night, and very little rain falls on the island during those months. The island's summer heat and humidity, which have been recorded as high as 100 °F (38 °C) and 100% RH, are cooled by the sea breezes from the Gulf, and by almost daily afternoon and evening rain showers, which are responsible for much of the island's rainfall. The island gets most of its rain in June. The area is prone to being hit by tropical cyclones and hurricanes; the hurricane season starts in June, but most of the activity occurs in September and October. Local communities have "adapted to cope with these occasional storm threats."

==== Hurricanes ====
Southwest Florida rarely suffers direct strikes by hurricanes, but every 20 or so years, it takes a significant hit, and about every 40 years a major one. Most of these have affected Sanibel. On August 13, 2004, it was hit hard by Hurricane Charley, a category-four hurricane with 143 mph (230 km/h) winds. It was the strongest to hit Southwest Florida since Hurricane Donna in September 1960. While much of the native vegetation survived, the nonindigenous Australian pines suffered serious damage, blocking nearly every road. Wildlife officials reported that the nests of birds and sea turtles were destroyed. The Sanibel Lighthouse suffered little damage, the Sanibel Causeway suffered relatively minor damage except for a tollbooth being tilted partly over, and a small seawall was eroded. Blind Pass was again cut through, but it refilled less than a month later. Residents who left before the August 13 storm were not allowed back by the city government until August 18, due to hundreds of downed trees and electric power lines, and the lack of potable water and sanitary sewerage. A temporary city hall for Sanibel was set up in a Fort Myers hotel until utilities and transport could be restored to the island.

On September 28, 2022, the island suffered extensive damage from Hurricane Ian, which made landfall just to the north of the island as a strong category-four storm. The Sanibel Causeway partially collapsed during the storm, leaving no road access to the island or nearby Captiva.

== Demographics ==
Historical population
Census	Pop.	Note	%±
1980	3,363		—
1990	5,468		62.6%
2000	6,064		10.9%
2010	6,469		6.7%
2020	6,382		−1.3%
U.S. Decennial Census

=== Racial and ethnic composition ===
Sanibel racial composition (Hispanics excluded from racial categories) (NH = Non-Hispanic)
Race	Pop 2010	Pop 2020	% 2010	% 2020
White (NH)	6,219	6,030	96.14%	94.48%
Black or African American (NH)	40	27	0.62%	0.42%
Native American or Alaska Native (NH)	5	8	0.08%	0.13%
Asian (NH)	24	44	0.37%	0.69%
Pacific Islander or Native Hawaiian (NH)	1	2	0.02%	0.03%
Some other race (NH)	7	16	0.11%	0.25%
Two or more races/multiracial (NH)	22	100	0.34%	1.57%
Hispanic or Latino (any race)	151	155	2.33%	2.43%
Total	6,469	6,382		

=== 2020 census ===
As of the 2020 census, Sanibel had a population of 6,382. The median age was 68.5 years. 6.0% of residents were under the age of 18 and 59.3% of residents were 65 years of age or older. For every 100 females there were 88.4 males, and for every 100 females age 18 and over there were 87.5 males age 18 and over.

93.0% of residents lived in urban areas, while 7.0% lived in rural areas.

There were 3,308 households in Sanibel, of which 7.9% had children under the age of 18 living in them. Of all households, 64.1% were married-couple households, 10.4% were households with a male householder and no spouse or partner present, and 22.2% were households with a female householder and no spouse or partner present. About 26.6% of all households were made up of individuals and 19.1% had someone living alone who was 65 years of age or older.

There were 7,708 housing units, of which 57.1% were vacant. The homeowner vacancy rate was 3.3% and the rental vacancy rate was 64.0%.

=== Demographic estimates ===
According to the 2020 ACS 5-year estimates, there were 2,766 families in the city.

=== 2010 census ===
As of the 2010 United States census, 6,469 people, 3,526 households, and 2,322 families were living in the city.

In 2010, the population density was 375.9 inhabitants per square mile (145.1/km^{2}). The 7,821 dwelling units had an average density of 454.6 per square mile (175.5/km^{2}). Of the 3,526 households, 8.5% had children under 18 living with them, 63.8% were married couples living together, 2.7% had a female householder with no husband present, and 32.3% were not families. About 27.9% of all households were made up of individuals, and 16.7% had someone living alone who was 65 or older. The average household size was 1.92 and the average family size was 2.28.

The age distribution in 2010 was 8.5% under 19, 1.1% from 20 to 24, 7.5% from 25 to 44, 32.7% from 45 to 64, and 50.1% were 65 or older. The median age was 65 years. For every 100 females, there were 89.8 males. For every 100 females 18 and over, there were 89.5 males 18 and over.

In 2010, the median income for a household in the city was $97,788, and for a family was $138,194. Males had a median income of $80,152 versus $45,458 for females. The per capita income for the city was $79,742. About 3.6% of families and 7.0% of the population were below the poverty line, with 21.3% of those under 18 and 3.4% of those 65 or over.

== Ecology ==
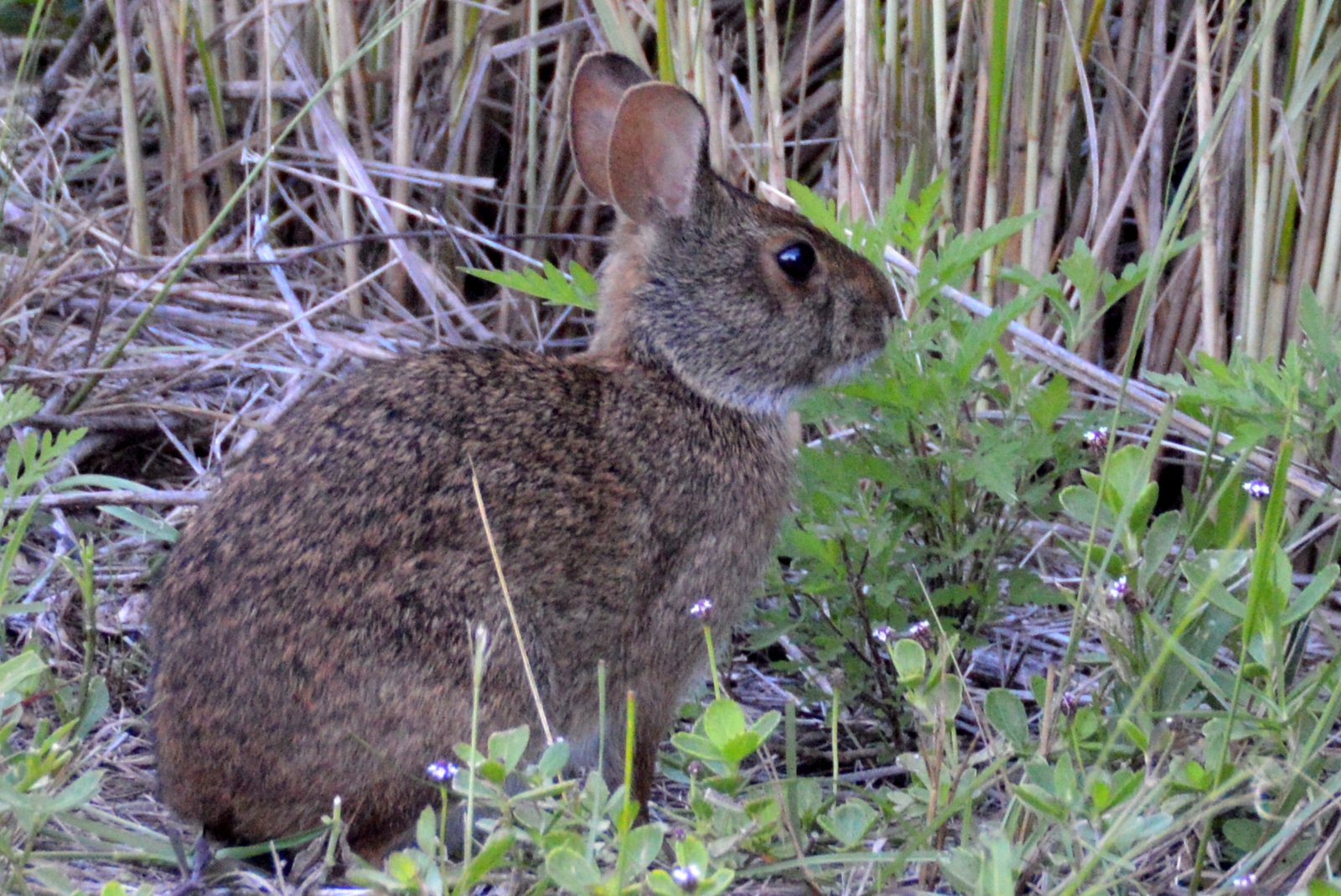
Marsh rabbits are common in Sanibel.

=== Flora and fauna ===
The island's curved, shrimp-like shape forms Tarpon Bay on the north side of the island. It is linked to the mainland by the Sanibel Causeway, which runs across two small, manmade islets and the Intracoastal Waterway. A short bridge links Sanibel Island to Captiva Island over Blind Pass. The Bailey-Matthews Shell Museum on Sanibel is the only museum in the world dedicated entirely to the study of shells. The Gulf-side beaches are excellent on both Sanibel and Captiva, and are world-renowned for their variety of seashells, which include coquinas, scallops, whelks, sand dollars, and many other species of both shallow- and deep-water mollusks, primarily bivalves and gastropods. Sanibel Island is home to a significant variety of birds, including the roseate spoonbill and several nesting pairs of bald eagles. Birds can be seen on the beaches, the causeway islands, and the reserves, including the J. N. "Ding" Darling National Wildlife Refuge. Common sights include pelicans, herons, egrets, and anhingas, as well as the more common birds such as terns, sandpipers, and gulls.

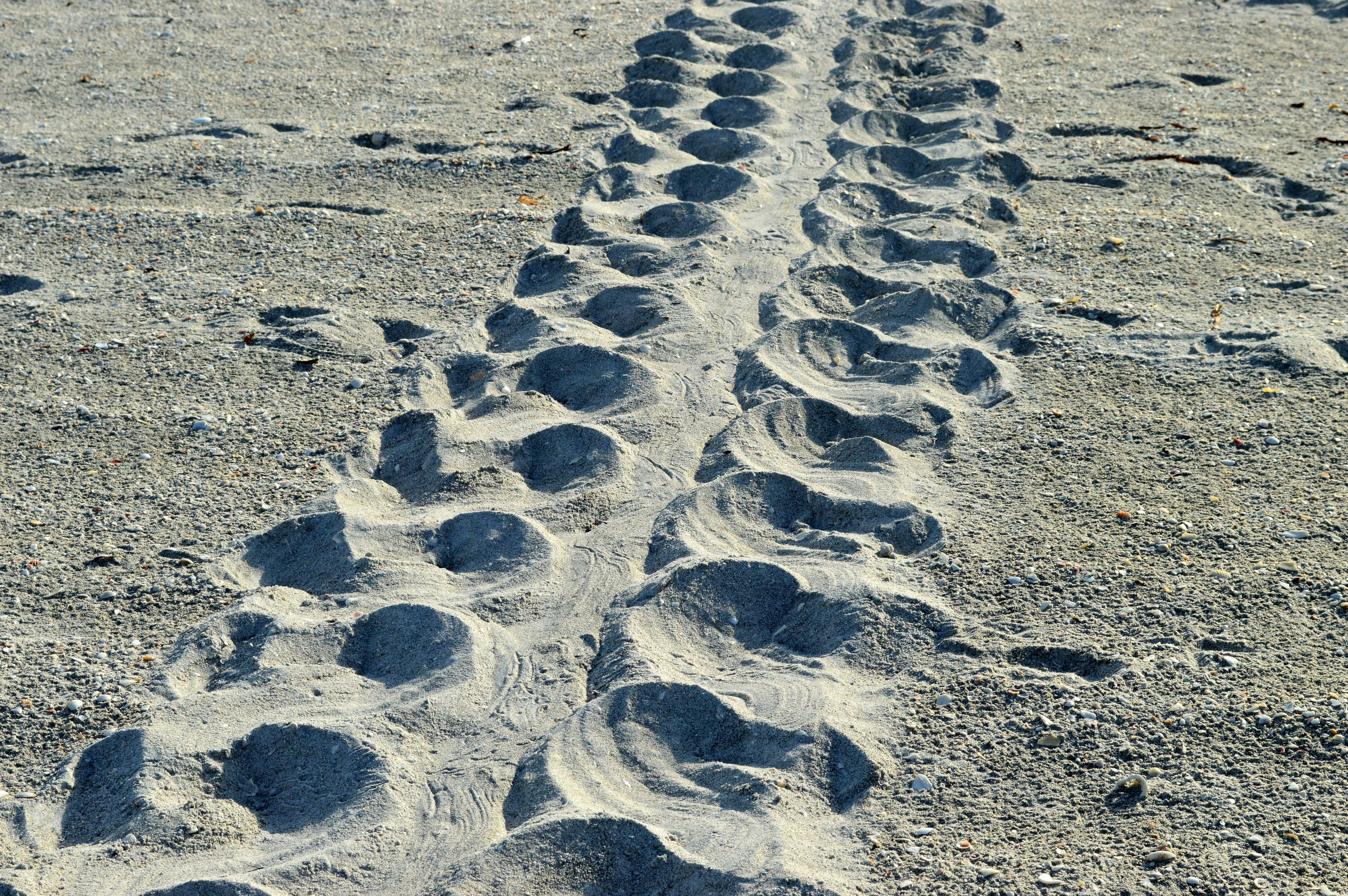
Loggerhead turtle track on a beach in Sanibel

A population of American alligators lives on Sanibel Island. A lone rare American crocodile had been seen at the wildlife refuge for over 30 years, but she died in 2010 of an unseasonably cold winter or old age. A memorial was set up at J.N. "Ding" Darling National Wildlife Refuge honoring "Wilma", as she was known by the residents. A new crocodile was introduced in May 2010, when she was found on a private property and relocated to the wildlife Refuge. Plants on the island include the native sea grape, sea oats, mangroves, and several types of palm trees. The Australian pine is an introduced species that has spread throughout the island, to some extent overpowering native vegetation and trees. Once mature, the pines block sunlight and drop a thick bed of pine needles that affect the soil's pH and prevent new native growth. The ground is very soft under these pines.

The local form of the marsh rice rat has been recognized in some classifications as a separate subspecies, Oryzomys palustris sanibeli.

In 1951, Sanibel saw the first successful effort at screwworm eradication.

=== Wildlife refuges ===
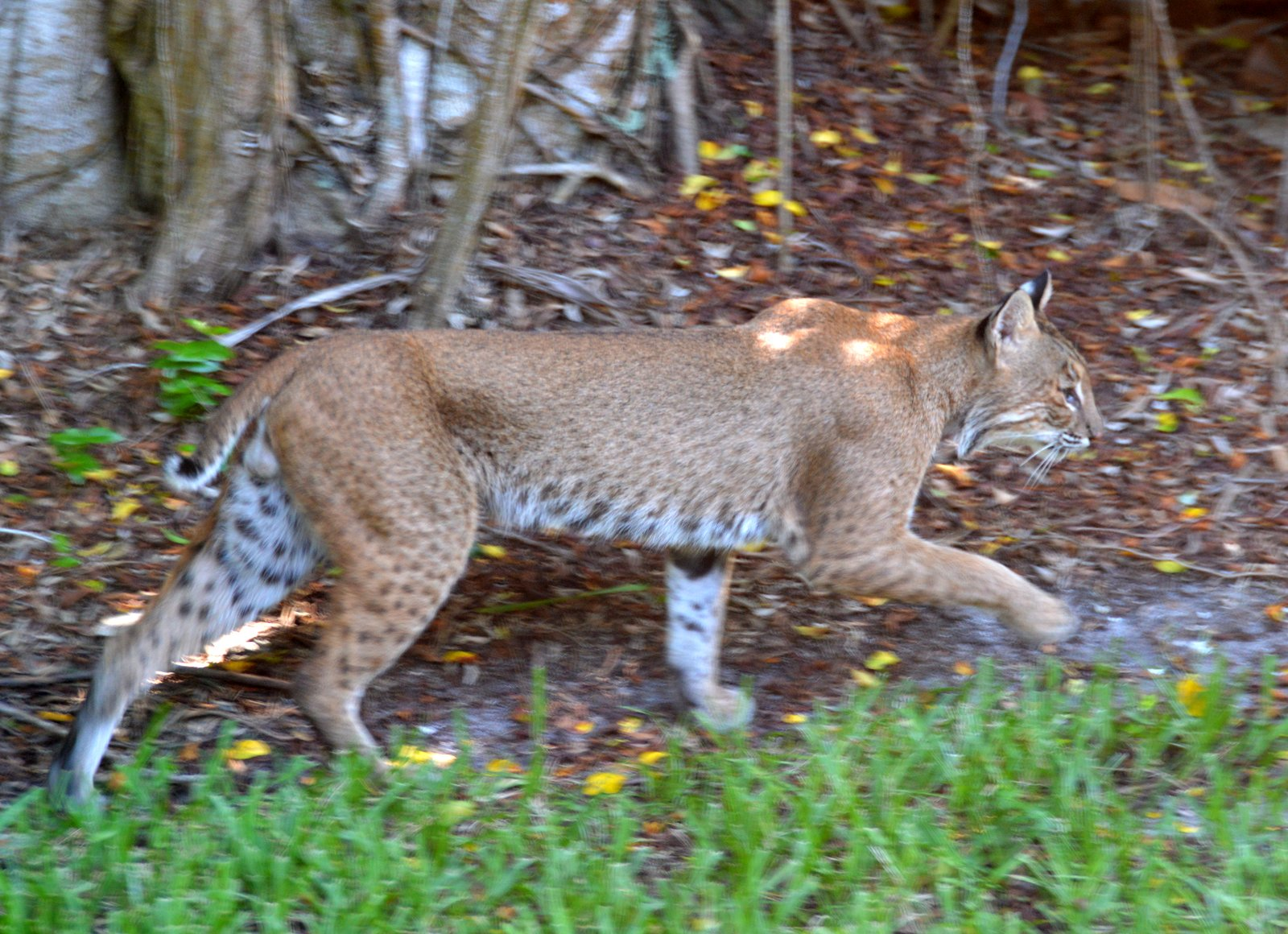
Bobcats are sometimes seen in Sanibel.

Preserving the island's natural ecology has always been important to its citizens and visitors alike. A driving force in the preservation of the island is the Sanibel-Captiva Conservation Foundation, which was founded in 1967 with a mission to "preserve natural resources and wildlife habitat on and around the islands of Sanibel and Captiva." 1,300 acres (5.3 km^{2}) of land on Sanibel are under the supervision of the foundation; included in this land, a marine laboratory actively conducts research in areas, including seagrasses, mangroves, harmful algal blooms, fish populations, and shellfish restoration. Sanibel Captiva Conservation Foundation also has a project called the River, Estuary and Coastal Observing Network, which includes a "network of eight in-water sensors that provide real-time, hourly readings of key water-quality parameters." The foundation also serves to protect the wildlife on the island and has a variety of education programs designed to instruct people about the island's unique ecology.

The biggest wildlife refuge on the island, the J.N. "Ding" Darling National Wildlife Refuge, covers more than 5,200 acres (21 km^{2}) of land; the refuge strives to ensure that these lands are "preserved, restored and maintained as a haven for indigenous and migratory wildlife as part of a nation-wide network of refuges administered by the U.S. Fish and Wildlife Service". The lands also serve to provide a home for many endangered and threatened species. Currently, the refuge provides a home for over 220 species of birds native to the island. Visitors to the refuge can walk, bike, drive, or kayak through the wildlife drive through five miles (8.0 kilometres) of mangrove tree forests and tidal flats; this drive is perfect for watching the island's wildlife and looking at the island's native vegetation. To show that preserving the wildlife really is important, the drive is closed one day every week, Friday, so that the wildlife can have a day to themselves where they can scavenge for food closer to the drive and not have to be bothered by or fearful of humans. Also, an education center features "interactive exhibits on refuge ecosystems, the life and work of "Ding" Darling, migratory flyways, and the National Wildlife Refuge System."

=== Beaches and seashells ===
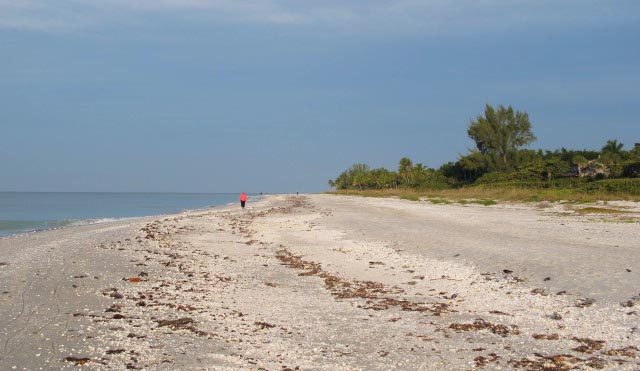
A view looking north on the beach at West Gulf Drive Beach access point #7, Sanibel, Lee County, Florida: The whitish objects are all shells, as are some of the brown objects.

Sanibel's beaches attract visitors from all around the world, partly because of the large quantities of seashells that wash up there. Many sand dollars can be found, as well. One of the reasons for these large accumulations of shells is that Sanibel is a barrier island that is "part of a large plateau that extends out into the Gulf of Mexico for miles. It is this plateau that acts like a shelf for seashells to gather." Sanibel also has an "east-west orientation when most islands are north-south. Hence, the island is gifted with great sandy beaches and an abundance of shells."

People who find the brown-spotted shell of a junonia on a Sanibel beach often get their picture in the local newspapers. Junonia volutes are reasonably common living in deep water, but only rarely wash up; a beach find of a whole shell is greatly prized. Junonia shells can be purchased at local shell shops and are displayed at the Bailey-Matthews National Shell Museum, in some of the glass display tables at the Sanibel Cafe, and at the Sanibel Shell Fair in early March.

Throughout the year, people come to Sanibel's beaches to gather shells. People are often seen bending down as they look for seashells, and this posture is known as the "Sanibel stoop". Beaches almost completely surround the island, with even beaches along the Sanibel Causeway that are great for fishing and windsurfing. Beach parking is very limited, and in high season, finding a convenient parking space can be a challenge.

Lighthouse Beach is named after Sanibel Lighthouse, which includes a popular fishing pier and nature trails. The island's most secluded beach is Bowman's Beach; no hotels are in sight and the beach has a "pristine and quiet" atmosphere.

== Infrastructure ==
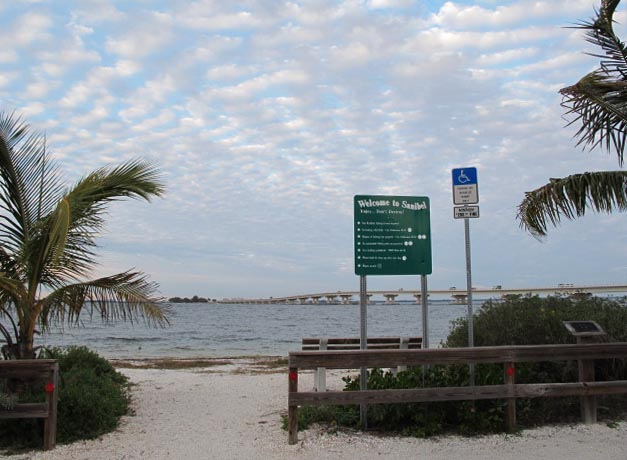
A view looking toward the mainland from the bay side of Sanibel shows the causeway in the distance.

=== Transportation ===
A new three-section causeway bridge to Sanibel was completed in 2007, with a high-span section replacing the original drawbridge. Many sections of the causeway were destroyed in September 2022 by Hurricane Ian, rendering it unusable. The causeway has since been repaired

== Library ==
Sanibel Public Library was built in 1994 and expanded in 2004. It has more than 60,000 titles.

== Notable people ==
- R. Tucker Abbott, leading 20th-century malacologist/conchologist
- Horace William Baden Donegan, bishop of New York Episcopal Church
- Clifton Fadiman, author and radio/TV personality
- Helaine Fendelman, appraiser
- Porter Goss first mayor and former CIA Director
- Willard Scott, TV personality
- Jean Shepherd, author, screenwriter, and radio humorist
- Randy Wayne White, writer of crime fiction and nonfiction adventure tales

== In literature ==
Sanibel Island is the main setting for crime novels by local author Randy Wayne White. Popular locales are referenced throughout his novels. White's main fictional character is Doc Ford, and due to his popularity, White opened a restaurant called Doc Ford's Sanibel Rum Bar and Grill.

Sanibel Island is the setting in the prologue of Emily Henry's 2021 novel People We Meet on Vacation.

== In film ==
Parts of George A. Romero's Day of the Dead were shot on Sanibel Island. Romero had a second home on Sanibel, where he rewrote Day of the Dead in 1984.

Night Moves, directed by Arthur Penn, was filmed on the island in 1975. It stars Gene Hackman, Jennifer Warren, and Susan Clark, and features early career appearances by James Woods and Melanie Griffith.

Written in the Sand debuted in 2025 and was largely filmed on the island. The romantic comedy stars JT Hodges and Courtney Grace attempting to rescue a resort and the island after a hurricane.

== Board game ==
Avalon Hill released the board game, Sanibel, in 2026 by designer, Elizabeth Hargrave. Art by Dahl Taylor. Players walk the beach collecting shells and add them to their personal ‘bag’ for points at the end of the game.
