= Randy Wayne White =

American novelist

Randy Wayne White (born 1950) is an American writer of crime fiction and non-fiction adventure tales. He has written New York Times best-selling novels and has received awards for his fiction and a television documentary. He is best known for his series of crime novels featuring the retired NSA agent Doc Ford, a marine biologist living on the Gulf Coast of southern Florida. White has contributed material on a variety of topics to numerous magazines and has lectured across the United States. A resident of Southwest Florida since 1972, he lives on Sanibel Island, where he is active in South Florida civic affairs and is a partner in the Doc Ford's Sanibel Rum Bar & Grill restaurants.

== Biography ==
White was born in Ashland, Ohio, and spent his early life on a small farm outside Pioneer, Ohio. His summers were spent in Rockingham, North Carolina, his mother's hometown. In the 1960s his family moved to Davenport, Iowa, where White attended Davenport Central High School and competed in baseball, football, and springboard diving. After graduating in 1968, he spent time in travel before settling in Southwest Florida in 1972. After "traveling" for five years after high school, White worked for the Fort Myers News-Press for four years during which time he obtained a captain's license. He then bought a used charter boat and operated as a light-tackle fishing guide at the Tarpon Bay Marina on Sanibel Island for thirteen years.

== Bibliography ==
=== Fiction by "Carl Ramm" ===
- Florida Firefight (1984)
- L.A. Wars (1984)
- Chicago Assault (1984)
- Deadly in New York (1984)
- Houston Attack (1985)
- Vegas Vengeance (1985)
- Detroit Combat (1985)
- Terror in D.C. (1986)
- Atlanta Extreme (1986)
- Denver Strike (1986)
- Operation Norfolk (1986)

=== Fiction by "Randy Striker" ===
- Key West Connection (1981)
- The Deep Six (1981)
- Cuban Death-Lift (1981)
- The Deadlier Sex (1981)
- Assassin's Shadow (1981)
- Everglades Assault (1982)
- Grand Cayman Slam (1982)

=== Doc Ford Novels ===
1. Sanibel Flats (1990, St. Martin's Press, ISBN 0-312-92602-2)
2. The Heat Islands (1992, St. Martin's Press, ISBN 0-312-92977-3)
3. The Man Who Invented Florida (1993, St. Martin's Press, ISBN 0-312-09866-9)
4. Captiva (1996, G.P. Putnam's Sons, ISBN 0-399-14140-5)
5. North of Havana (1997, G.P. Putnam's Sons, ISBN 0-399-14242-8)
6. The Mangrove Coast (1998, G.P. Putnam's Sons, ISBN 0-399-14372-6)
7. Ten Thousand Islands (2000, G.P. Putnam's Sons, ISBN 0-399-14620-2)
8. Shark River (2001, G.P. Putnam's Sons, ISBN 0-399-14729-2)
9. Twelve Mile Limit (2002, G.P. Putnam's Sons, ISBN 0-399-14873-6)
10. Everglades (2003, G.P. Putnam's Sons, ISBN 0-399-15058-7)
11. Tampa Burn (2004, G.P. Putnam's Sons, ISBN 0-399-15181-8)
12. Dead of Night (2005, G.P. Putnam's Sons, ISBN 0-399-15244-X)
13. Dark Light (2006, G.P. Putnam's Sons, ISBN 0-399-15336-5)
14. Hunter's Moon (2007, G.P. Putnam's Sons, ISBN 0-399-15370-5)
15. Black Widow (2008, G.P. Putnam's Sons, ISBN 0-399-15456-6)
16. Dead Silence (2009, G.P. Putnam's Sons, ISBN 978-0-399-15540-6)
17. Deep Shadow (2010, G.P. Putnam's Sons, ISBN 978-0-399-15626-7)
18. Night Vision (2011, G.P. Putnam's Sons, ISBN 978-0-399-15705-9)
19. Chasing Midnight (2012, G.P. Putnam's Sons, ISBN 978-0-399-15831-5)
20. Night Moves (March, 2013, G.P. Putnam's Sons, ISBN 978-0-399-15812-4)
21. Bone Deep (March, 2014, G.P. Putnam's Sons, ISBN 978-0-399-15813-1)
22. Cuba Straits (March, 2015, G.P. Putnam's Sons, ISBN 978-0-698-18435-0)
23. Deep Blue (March, 2016, G.P. Putnam's Sons, ISBN 978-0-399-17351-6)
24. Mangrove Lightning (March, 2017, G.P. Putnam's Sons, ISBN 978-0-399-57668-3)
25. Caribbean Rim (March, 2018, G.P. Putnam's Sons, ISBN 978-0-735-21278-7)
26. Salt River (February, 2020 G.P. Putnam's Sons, ISBN 978-0-735-21272-5)
27. One Deadly Eye (June, 2024 Hanover Square Press, ISBN 978-1-335-01360-6)
28. Tomlinson's Wake (June, 2025 Hanover Square Press, ISBN 978-1-335-01429-0)

=== Sharks Incorporated novels ===
A Doc Ford spinoff for kids.

1. Fins (March 2020, Roaring Brook Press, ISBN 9781250244659)
2. Stingers (May 2021, Roaring Brook Press, ISBN 9781250244635)
3. Crocs (March 2022, Roaring Brook Press, ISBN 9781250813497)

=== Hannah Smith novels ===
1. Gone (2012, G.P. Putnam's Sons, ISBN 978-0-399-15849-0)
2. Deceived (2013, G.P. Putnam's Sons, ISBN 978-0-399-16207-7)
3. Haunted (2014, G. P. Putnam's Sons, ISBN 978-0-399-16976-2)
4. Seduced (2016, Penguin Publishing Group ISBN 978-0-399-16977-9)

=== Non-fiction ===
- Batfishing in the Rainforest (1991, Lyons & Burford)
- The Sharks of Lake Nicaragua: True tales of adventure, travel, and fishing (1999, Lyon's Press, ISBN 1-55821-904-8)
- Last Flight Out: True tales of adventure, travel, and fishing (2002, Lyons Press, ISBN 1-58574-383-6)
- "Dr. Pepper" in Outside 25: Classic tales and new voices from the frontiers of adventure, edited by Hal Espen (2002, W.W. Norton, ISBN 0-393-05186-2)
- An American Traveler (2003, Lyons Press, ISBN 1-59228-033-1)
- A Fishing Guide's Guide to Tropical Cooking (2006, Algonquin Press)
- Randy Wayne White's Gulf Coast Cookbook: With memories and photos of Sanibel Island, photographs by Carlene Fredericka Brennen (2006, The Globe Pequot Press, ISBN 1-59228-096-X)

=== Contributions to periodicals ===
- Contributing editor and columnist for Men's Journal
- Contributing editor and columnist for Men's Health
- Contributor to National Geographic Adventure
- An editor-at-large of Outside

== Bibliography ==
- MacDonald, Jay. "'Doc Ford' author drifting aimlessly in financial waters". News & Advice. Bankrate.com. April 26, 2005. (Retrieved November 10, 2006)
- "The Outside Literary All-Stars: Randy Wayne White". Outside online. (Retrieved November 10, 2006)
