= JT Hodges =

American musician and actor (born 1977)

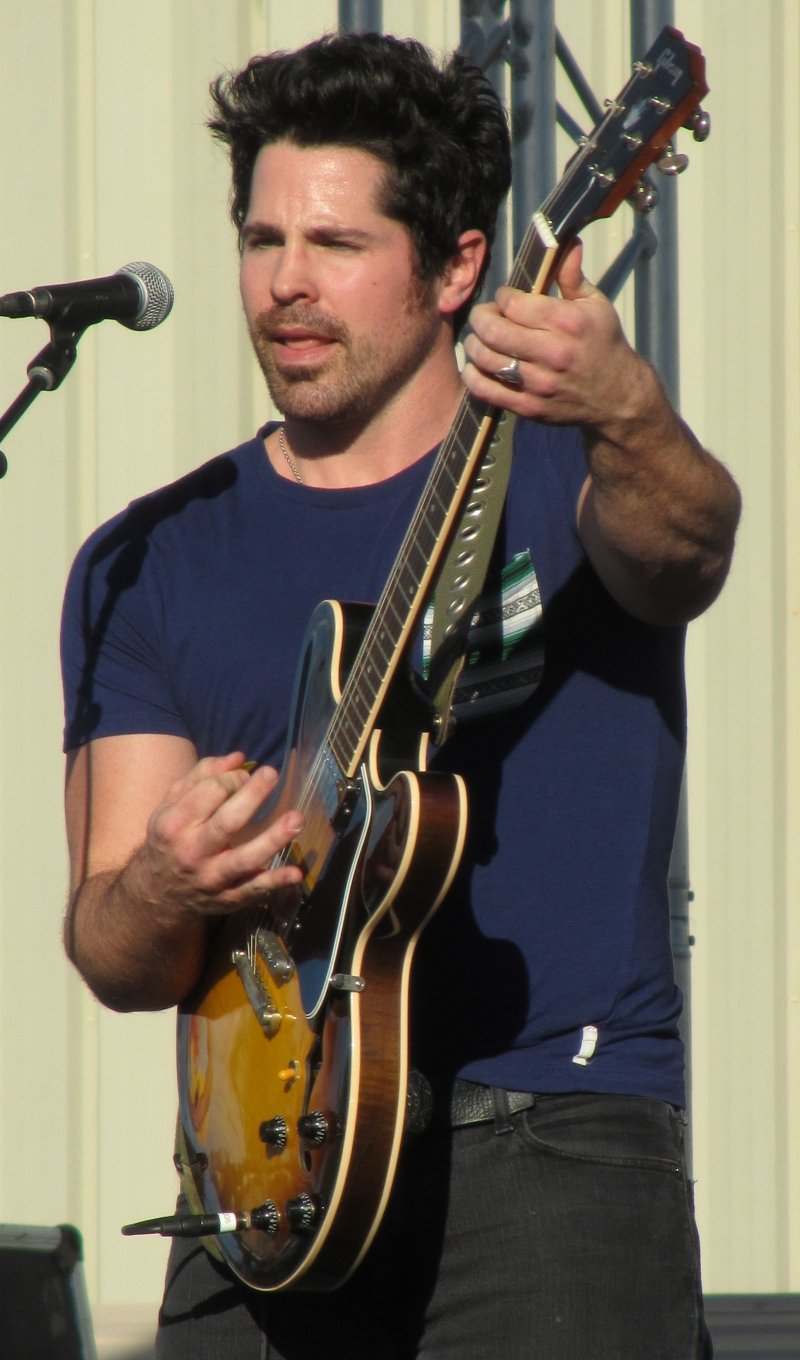
- JT Hodges in December 2012

Background information
- Also known as: JT
- Born: Justin Taylor Hodges; July 6, 1977 (age 49); Fort Worth, Texas
- Genres: Country
- Occupations: Singer; songwriter; actor
- Instruments: Vocals; guitar
- Years active: 2011–present
- Label: Show Dog-Universal

Justin Taylor Hodges (born July 6, 1977) is an American country music singer, songwriter and actor. In 2011, he signed to Show Dog-Universal Music and released one album, which has produced three charting singles on the Hot Country Songs chart.

== Early life ==
Justin Taylor Hodges was born on July 6, 1977, and raised in Fort Worth, Texas, by father James McKinley Hodges and mother Marsha Kathleen McDade Hodges. He attended The Oakridge School for high school and graduated in 1996. He later graduated from Texas Christian University and moved to Los Angeles, spending several years on the coffeehouse circuit. He met his wife in Jay in California and they moved to Nashville in 2009.

== Musical career ==
Hodges' parents are both involved in music: his father is a pianist who owns a recording studio in Fort Worth, Texas, and his mother was briefly signed to MCA Nashville in the 1980s. He recorded a version of "The Bed You Made for Me", later a top 5 hit for Highway 101 in 1987.

In mid-2011, Hodges signed to Show Dog-Universal Music and released his debut single, "Hunt You Down", which he co-wrote with Rivers Rutherford and Mark Collie. Billy Dukes of Taste of Country gave the song four stars out of five, saying that it had an "infectious melody" but criticizing the lyrics for being "too cool for the room". Kyle Ward gave an identical rating at Roughstock, also saying that the song had an original sound, although he thought that the "story is a bit implausible" and said that he did not understand the song's bridge. Hodges' debut album includes eleven songs, nine of which he co-wrote. "Goodbyes Made You Mine" and "Sleepy Little Town" also charted from it.

Hodges joined Toby Keith's 2011 Locked and Loaded Tour.

In 2015, Hodges released an EP, titled Locks on Doors. The EP sold 500 copies in its debut week.

== Discography ==
=== Studio albums ===
Title	Details	Peak chart positions		
Title	Details	US Country	US	US Heat
JT Hodges	Release date: August 21, 2012; Label: Show Dog-Universal Music	23	114	1

=== Extended plays ===
Title	Album details
Locks on Doors	Release date: April 22, 2015; Label: Buffalo Sound Records; Formats: Music download
City Lights to Fire Sides	Release date: 2018; Label: Buffalo Sound Records; Formats: Music download

=== Singles ===
Year	Single	Peak chart positions		Album
Year	Single	US Country	US Country Airplay	Album
2011	"Hunt You Down"	39	—	JT Hodges
2012	"Goodbyes Made You Mine"	43	—	JT Hodges
2012	"Sleepy Little Town"	60	55	JT Hodges
2014	"Already High"	—	—	Non-album singles
2017	"Dance Right Here"	—	—	Non-album singles
"—" denotes releases that did not chart

=== Music videos ===
Year	Video	Director
2011	"Hunt You Down"	Marcel
2012	"Goodbyes Made You Mine"	Mason Dixon
2014	"Already High"	Mason Dixon
2015	"Ray Bans"	Marcel
2016	"After Midnight"	Marcel

== Filmography ==
- Finding Christmas 2013
- Verizon Super Bowl Central Kickoff Concert
- The Dust Storm
- Christmas Stars 2019
- Christina In The Country Season 1 Episode 6 2023
- Written in the Sand (2025 film)
