= Sanibel-Captiva Conservation Foundation =

Ecosystem protection group in Florida, US

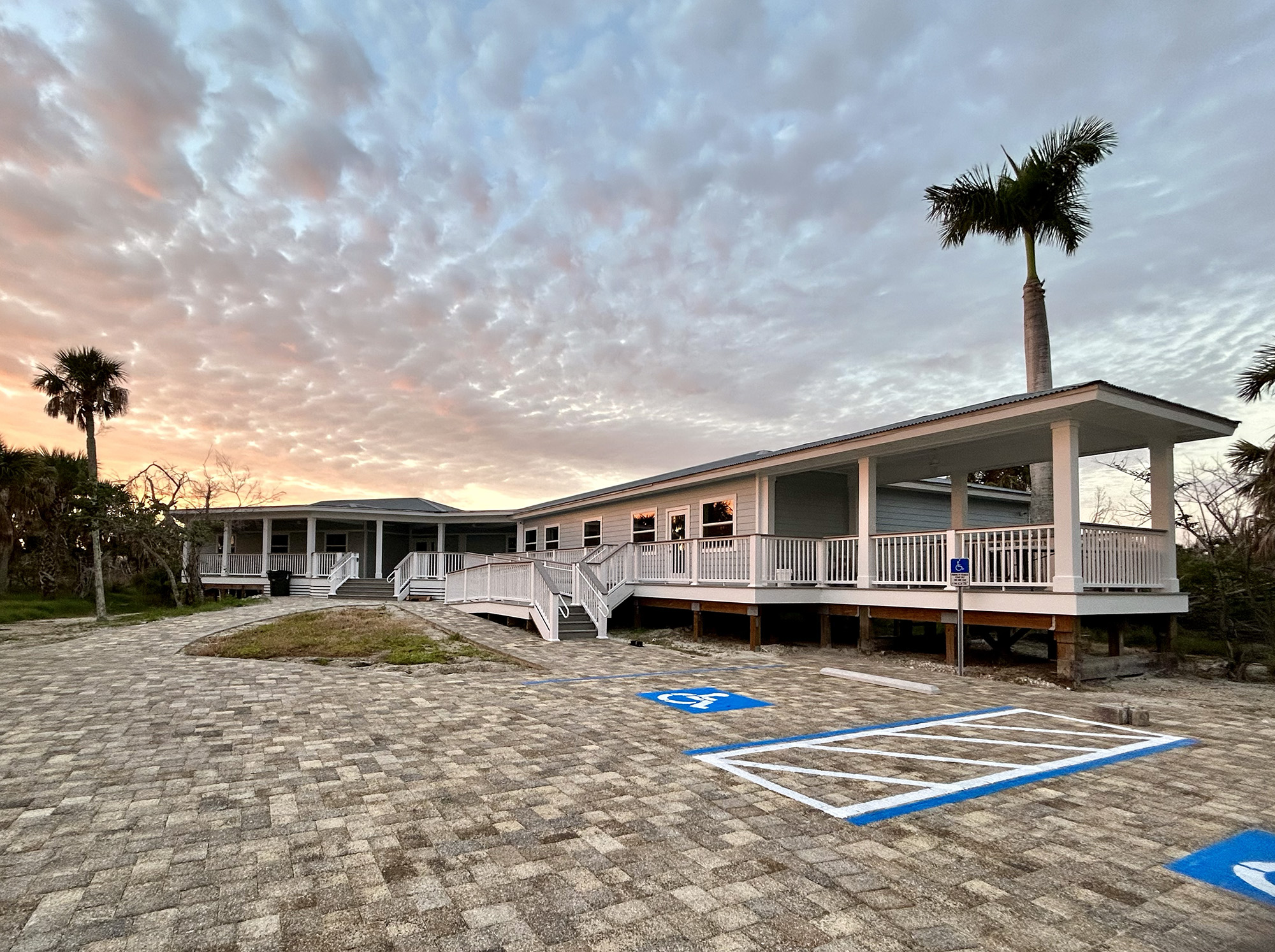
SCCF Headquarters building on Sanibel Island, Florida in Dec. 2023.

The Sanibel-Captiva Conservation Foundation (SCCF) is an American ecosystem protection group. It was founded in 1967 on Sanibel Island, Florida to preserve the island's interior freshwater system. The non-profit's mission has since evolved to also protect and care for Southwest Florida's coastal ecosystems.

SCCF is the largest private landowner on Sanibel, protecting around 1,800 acres on the island. SCCF also owns more than 300 additional acres in the region, including on the islands of Pine Island Sound, Fort Myers and Cape Coral. Many of these acres are closed to the public, though SCCF has over 8 miles of public trails.

The Native Landscapes & Garden Centre sells native plants, and offers landscaping and educational programs. The Marine Laboratory monitors water quality and conducts research on subjects such as seagrass, mangroves, harmful algal blooms, and shellfish restoration. The lab also oversees a water-quality sensor network throughout the Caloosahatchee, known as the River, Estuary, and Coastal Observing Network. SCCF monitors the shorebird snowy plover, loggerhead sea turtles, and occasional leatherback sea turtles on the Sanibel and Captiva Islands, which has an environmental policy program. SCCF also monitors other wildlife species that are federally threatened such as the Eastern indigo snake.

== Sea Turtle Monitoring ==
SCCF's sea turtle program operates under a permit granted by the Florida Fish and Wildlife Conservation Commission to monitor sea turtles on Sanibel and Captiva Islands. Sea turtle monitoring on Sanibel began in the late 1950s, and the program was transferred to SCCF in 1992.

Most of the sea turtles that nest on Sanibel and Captiva are loggerheads (Caretta caretta) or green sea turtles (Chelonia mydas), with around 600 or more loggerhead nests laid on the islands each year, as well as an average of a dozen or more green turtle nests. Leatherback sea turtles (Dermochelys coriacea) and Kemp's ridley sea turtles (Lepidochelys kempii) also nest occasionally on the islands.
