= Sanibel Island Light =

Lighthouse in Sanibel, Florida, United States

- The Sanibel Island Light Station in 2019
- Location: East end of Sanibel Island
- Coordinates: 26°27′10.6″N 82°0′51.4″W

Tower
- Foundation: iron pile
- Construction: iron
- Automated: 1949
- Height: 98 feet (30 m) feet (102 feet (31 m) above sea level)
- Shape: Square, pyramidal, skeleton, iron framework, inclosing stair-cylinder and surmounted by lantern
- Heritage: National Register of Historic Places listed place

Light
- First lit: 1884
- Focal height: 31 m (102 ft)
- Lens: third order Fresnel lens
- Range: 13 nmi (24 km; 15 mi)
- Characteristic: 1901: fixed white varied by a white flash every 2 minutes; 1933: two grouped white flashes every 10 seconds
- Sanibel Lighthouse and Keeper's Quarters
- U.S. National Register of Historic Places
- NRHP reference No.: 74000648

The Sanibel Island Light or Point Ybel Light was one of the first lighthouses on Florida's Gulf coast north of Key West and the Dry Tortugas. The light, 98-foot above sea level, on an iron skeleton tower was first lit on August 20, 1884 and has a central spiral staircase beginning about 10 feet above the ground. It is located on the eastern tip of Sanibel Island, and was built to mark the entrance to San Carlos Bay for ships calling at the port of Punta Rassa, across San Carlos Bay from Sanibel Island. The grounds are open to the public, but the lighthouse itself is not.

== History ==
Residents of Sanibel Island first petitioned for a lighthouse in 1833, but no action was taken. In 1856 the Lighthouse Board recommended a lighthouse on Sanibel Island, but Congress took no action. In 1877 government workers surveyed the eastern end of the island and reserved it for a lighthouse. Congress finally appropriated funds for a lighthouse in 1883. The foundation for the new lighthouse was completed in early 1884, but the ship bringing ironwork for the tower sank two miles (3 km) from Sanibel Island. A crew of hard-hat divers from Key West recovered all but two of the pieces for the tower.

Punta Rassa became an important port in the 1830s and remained so up to the Spanish–American War. It was primarily used to ship cattle from Florida to Cuba. Until the railroads reached the area in the 1880s, ranchers drove their cattle from open ranges in central Florida to Punta Rassa for shipment to Cuba.

The lighthouse was placed on the National Register of Historic Places in 1974. The City of Sanibel now owns the Point Ybel tract and structures, although the tower is still operational under U.S. Coast Guard control.

In 2022, Hurricane Ian severely damaged the station, destroying both keeper’s houses and all of the surrounding outbuildings. The tower lost one leg, but was still standing as of September 29, 2022. Sanibel Lighthouse was relit for the first time following Hurricane Ian in the early morning on February 28, 2023 symbolizing the hope of Sanibel Island after the hurricane.

== Keepers ==
- Dudley Richardson 1884 – 1892
- Henry Shannahan 1892 – 1913
- Charles Henry Williams 1913 – 1923
- Eugene Shanahan 1924 – 1926
- William Demere 1926 – 1932
- Roscoe McLane 1932 – 1935
- Richard J. Palmer 1935 – 1946
- William Robert England 1946 – 1949
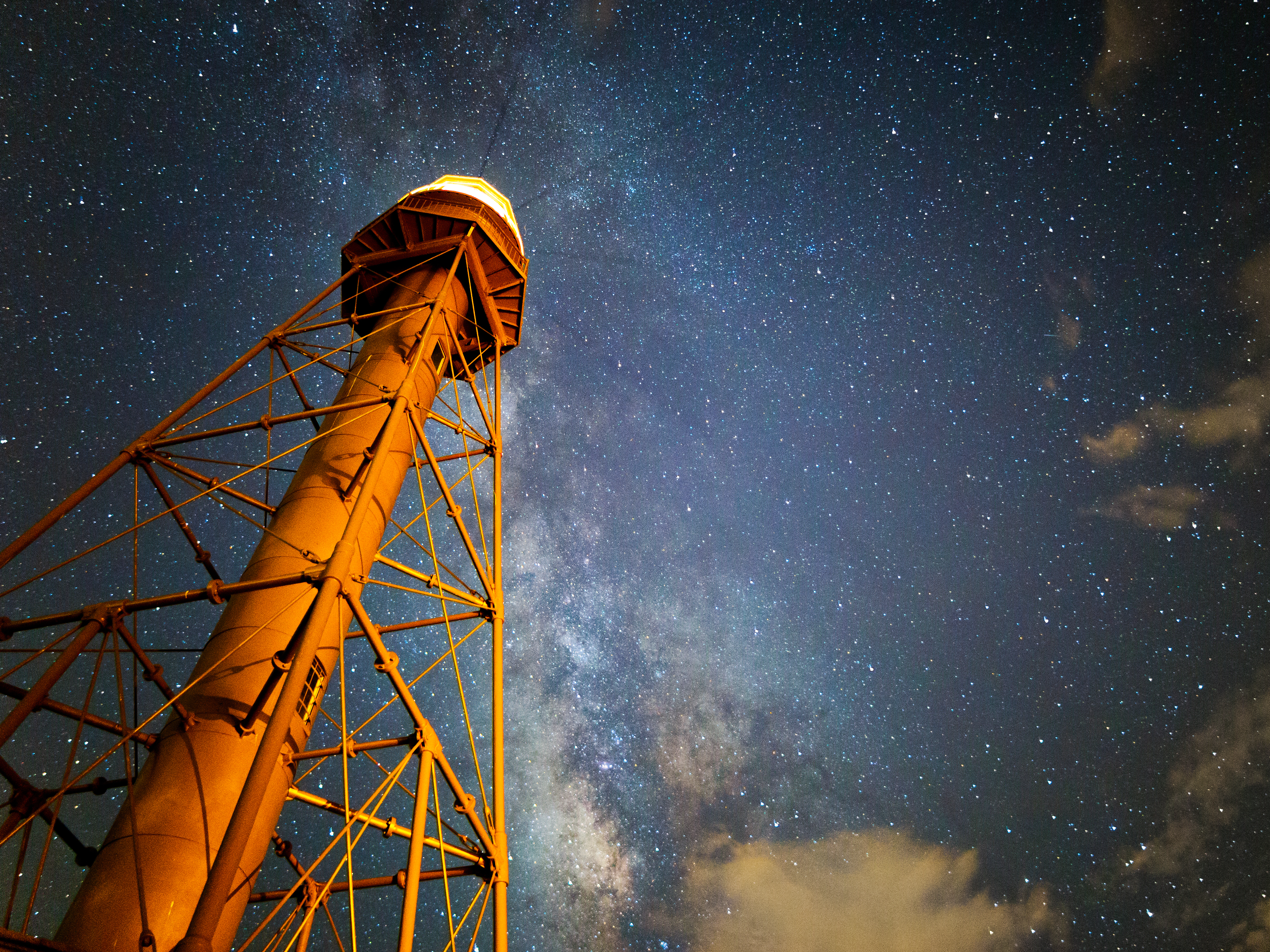
The light in June 2014

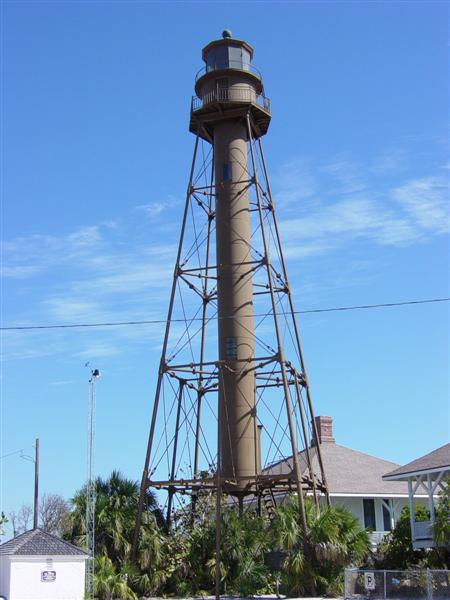
January 2006

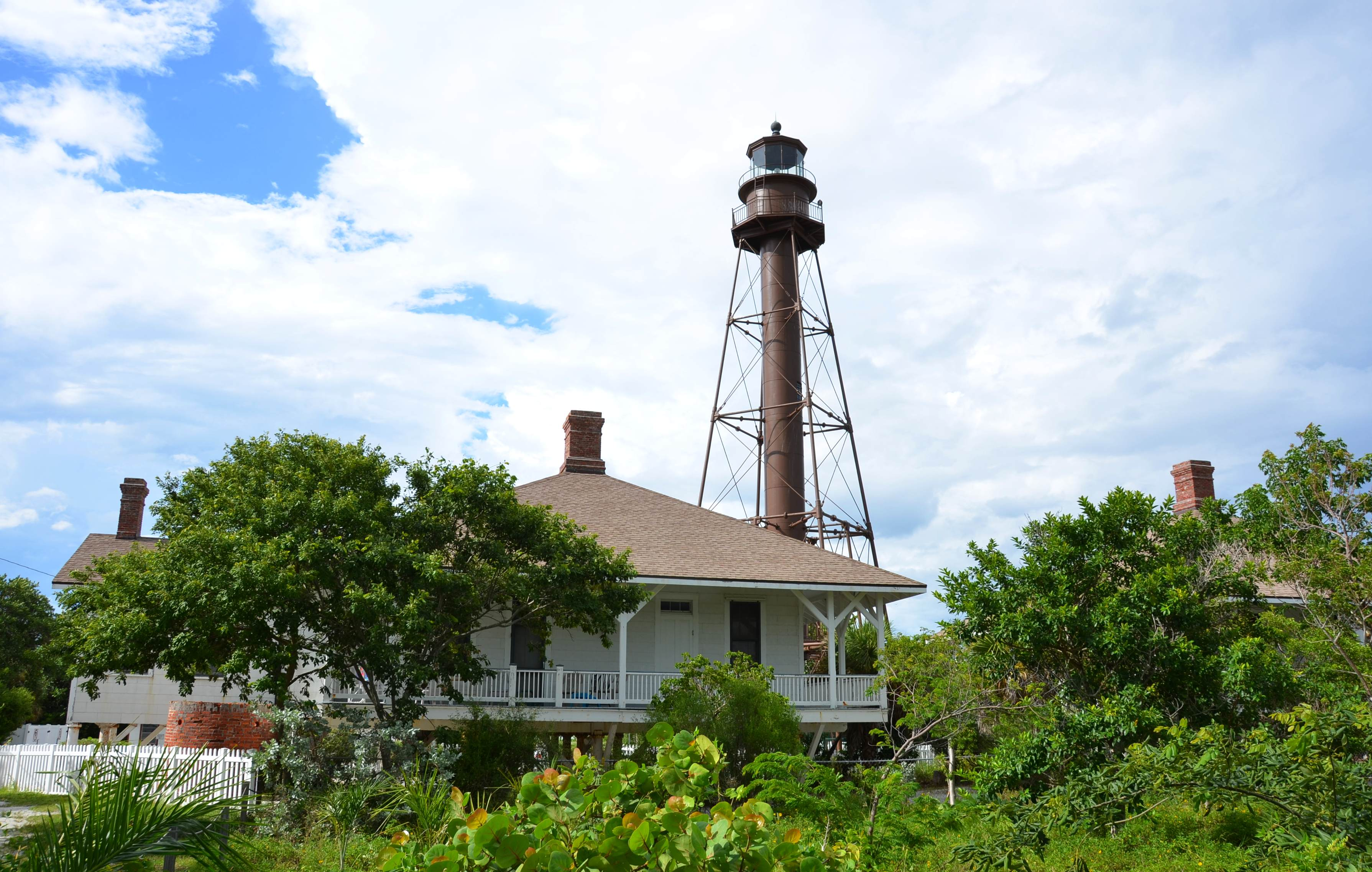
September 2014.
