= Written in the Sand (film) =

- Directed by: Robert Vaughn
- Produced by: Daniel McClung; JT Hodges
- Starring: Courtney Grace; JT Hodges; Grover McCants; Kira Spencer Cook; Michael Harding
- Distributed by: Indie Rights
- Release date: 2025
- Running time: 87 minutes
- Country: United States
- Language: English

Written in the Sand is a 2025 American romantic comedy film directed by Robert Vaughn. It stars Courtney Grace and country music singer JT Hodges. Set on Sanibel Island, Florida, the film follows a dedicated resort manager and a reluctant hotelier heir who partner to rebuild a hurricane-damaged resort while navigating personal ambitions and an unexpected romance.

== Plot ==
Following a devastating hurricane on Sanibel Island, Florida, the iconic Sundial Resort and Spa is left in ruins right before tourist season. Mark Fairbanks (J. T. Hodges), the reluctant heir who left years earlier to pursue a music career, returns home to help rebuild the property.

Upon arrival, Mark meets Daniella Charles (Courtney Grace), the dedicated resort manager. The two strike a mutual deal: Daniella agrees to help Mark build an audience for his music, while Mark commits to restoring the resort. As repairs progress, their initial business agreement develops into a romance, forcing Mark to decide between protecting his new relationship and confronting troubling news regarding the resort.

== Cast ==
- Courtney Grace as Daniella Charles, the resort manager
- JT Hodges as Mark Fairbanks, the resort heir and musician
- Warren Alder as Dennis Michelson
- Carlos J. Alberto as Micah
- Angie Bullaro as Tracey Jacobs
- Erin Cline as Julie Fairbanks
- Michael Harding as Clive Fairbanks
- Grover McCants as Andre Charles

== Production ==
The film was directed by Robert Vaughn and produced by Daniel McClung alongside J. T. Hodges. Filming took place on location along the Florida Gulf Coast, highlighting Sanibel Island.

== Release ==
Written in the Sand was released in 2025 and made available via digital video-on-demand services like Amazon Prime, Apple TV, and Tubi through distributor Indie Rights.
