= List of county roads in Collier County, Florida =

- Standard county road shields used in Collier County

Highway names
- Interstates: Interstate X (I-X)
- US Highways: U.S. Highway X (US X)
- State: State Road X (SR X)
- County: County Road X (CR X)

System links
- County roads in Florida

The following is a list of county roads in Collier County, Florida. All county roads are maintained by the county in which they reside, however not all of them are marked with standard MUTCD approved county road shields. County roads are maintained by Collier County Transportation Management Services (Collier County TMS).

Most of the county roads in Collier County were formerly state roads. In the mid 1970s, the Florida Department of Transportation (formerly the State Road Department) downgraded a number of the state roads to secondary state roads. On January 5, 1976, many of the roads were also renumbered to have a more streamlined numbering system. By the mid 1980s, the secondary state roads were turned over to county control.

== County Road 29 ==
County Road 29
- Location: Chokoloskee–Carnestown
- Length: 13 mi (21 km)

County Road 29, once part of State Road 29 prior to the 1980s, is a 13-mile route connecting Everglades City and Chokoloskee Island with the Tamiami Trail in Carnestown.

The southern terminus of CR 29 is in Chokoloskee, where it known as Smallwood Avenue (named for Ted Smallwood, who opened the areas historic general store which is now a museum). From Chokoloksee, CR 29 crosses a causeway across Chokoloskee Bay, which was built in 1956, to Everglades City.

In Everglades City, CR 29 is known as Copeland Avenue in the southern half of the town. Copeland Avenue is named for David Graham Copeland, who worked closely with Barron Collier in the development of Everglades City.

Just north of Everglades Airpark, CR 29 encounters a roundabout, where it turns east along Broadway towards the former Atlantic Coast Line Railroad depot. It then turns north along Collier Avenue, where it continues out of the city and terminating at U.S. Route 41 in Carnestown.

== County Road 29A ==
County Road 29A
- Location: Immokalee
- Length: 2.3 mi (3.7 km)

County Road 29A is New Market Road in Immokalee. The 2.3 mile route connects to State Road 29 at each end, and it serves as a bypass around downtown Immokalee.

== County Road 31 ==
County Road 31
- Location: East Naples–North Naples
- Length: 10.1 mi (16.3 km)

County Road 31 is one of the Naples area's major north–south corridors. It is known as Airport-Pulling Road, though some signs still refer to it by its former name, Airport Road.

=== Route description ===
Airport-Pulling Road begins in East Naples at an intersection with US 41 (Tamiami Trail). The Collier County Government Center is located on the northeast corner of this intersection. From US 41, Airport-Pulling Road is a six-lane highway and it heads north, coming to an intersection with SR 84 (Davis Boulevard) less than a mile from US 41. It continues north just to the east of Naples city limits and passes Naples Airport before coming to a single point urban interchange with CR 886 (Golden Gate Parkway), a major route which connects Naples with Golden Gate. Further North, Airport-Pulling Road intersects with two more of Collier County's major east-west routes: CR 896 (Pine Ridge Road) and CR 862 (Vanderbiilt Beach Road). Less than a mile north of CR 862, Airport-Pulling Road is reduced to four lanes before coming to its northern terminus at CR 846 (Immokalee Road).

=== History ===
The first segment of what would become Airport-Pulling Road was from US 41 in East Naples to present-day CR 856 (Radio Road). This initial segment notably provided access to the Atlantic Coast Line Railroad's original Naples depot, which was built in 1926 and was located on the northeast corner of the present-day intersection of Airport-Pulling Road and Radio Road. The railroad station was closed and tracks were removed in 1944 when the Atlantic Coast Line relocated to the 5th Avenue depot in Downtown Naples, which was originally built by the Seaboard Air Line Railroad.

In 1942, Naples Army Airfield was built, which would become Naples Airport. The road would provide access to it, which led to the road becoming known as Airport Road. By the 1950s, the initial segment of Airport Road was designated as part of SR 858 along with Bayshore Drive south of Tamiami Trail. SR 858 would also run east from the airport along what would be later known as Radio Road.

Airport Road was eventually extended north of the airport, which would be designated as part of SR 951. A mile north of the airport, SR 951 would turn west toward Naples High School, which would later become part of Golden Gate Parkway. In the late 1950s, Airport Road was extended north to the newly completed Naples Immokalee Highway, which was complete in 1958 and known today as Immokalee Road. Airport Road north of SR 951 would receive the secondary designation SR 31. A major proponent of this extension was local developer John Pulling, who helped secure the right of way for part the extension. Airport Road would later be renamed Airport-Pulling Road in Pulling's honor.

Airport-Pulling Road would maintain its segmented designations of SR 858, SR 951, and SR 31 until the state road renumbering in January 1976. Airport-Pulling Road then became SR 31 in its entirety, along with Bayshore Drive. It then became CR 31 as it is today when it was turned over to county control in the 1980s. Though, Bayshore Drive was not included as part of CR 31.

=== Major intersections ===
Location	mi	km	Destinations	Notes
East Naples	0.00	0.00	US 41 (Tamiami Trail)	
East Naples	0.80	1.29	SR 84 (Davis Boulevard)	
East Naples	1.81	2.91	CR 856 east (Radio Road)	Western terminus of CR 856; access to Naples Municipal Airport
	3.30	5.31	CR 886 (Golden Gate Parkway) to I-75	Single point urban interchange
North Naples	5.80	9.33	CR 896 (Pine Ridge Road) to I-75	Former SR 896
North Naples	8.10	13.04	CR 862 (Vanderbilt Beach Road)	
North Naples	10.10	16.25	CR 846 (Immokalee Road) – North Naples, Immokalee	Former SR 846
1.000 mi = 1.609 km; 1.000 km = 0.621 mi

== County Road 92 ==
County Road 92
- Location: Marco Island
- Length: 11.4 mi (18.3 km)

County Road 92 is known as San Marco Road connecting Marco Island to the mainland.

=== Route description ===
San Marco Road begins on the west end of Marco Island at Collier Boulevard (former SR 951). From here, it heads east through the center of Marco Island. On the east side of the island, San Marco Road passes just north of the community of Goodland before crossing the Stan Gober Memorial Bridge on to the Collier County mainland. Once on the mainland, it turns northeast before turning back east through Collier–Seminole State Park. CR 92 comes to its eastern terminus at US 41 (Tamiami Trail). just north of the main entrance to Collier–Seminole State Park.

=== History ===
San Marco Road was largely complete in 1938 with the opening of the original Goodland Bridge, which was the first automobile bridge to Marco Island. Upon its completion, it was designated SR 27A. It was considered a spur of SR 27, which was the original hidden state road designation US 41 (which was US 94 at the time). SR 27A was redesignated SR 92 during the 1945 Florida State Road renumbering. SR 92 became CR 92 when it was turned over to county control in the mid 1980s.

The original Goodland Bridge, which was a wooden swing bridge, was replace by the current Stan Gober Memorial Bridge in 1975.

=== Major intersections ===
Location	mi	km	Destinations	Notes
Marco Island	0.00	0.00	Collier Boulevard	Western terminus of CR 92; former SR 951
Marco Island	4.9	7.9	CR 892 (Goodland Drive)	
	11.4	18.3	US 41 (Tamiami Trail / SR 90) – Naples, Miami	Eastern terminus
1.000 mi = 1.609 km; 1.000 km = 0.621 mi

== County Road 268 ==
County Road 268
- Location: East Naples
- Length: 2 mi (3.2 km)

County Road 268 is a county road in Collier County. It is known as County Barn Road, and it runs from Florida State Road 84 (Davis Boulevard) to Collier County Road 864 (Rattlesnake Hammock Road).

== County Road 837 ==
County Road 837
- Location: Copeland
- Length: 7.9 mi (12.7 km)

County Road 837 exists in two segments near Copeland. The west segment is less than a half mile long running from State Road 29 into Copeland. The longer east segment, known as Wagon Wheel Road, exists just north of Copeland running from SR 29 east to CR 839 in the Big Cypress National Preserve.

== County Road 839 ==
County Road 839
- Location: Ochopee
- Length: 20.5 mi (33.0 km)

County Road 839, locally known as Turner River Road, is a 20-mile route through the Big Cypress National Preserve. It runs just east of and parallel to State Road 29. It begins at U.S. Route 41 east of Ochopee near the Turner River and ends just east of Miles City after crossing underneath I-75/Alligator Alley.

== County Road 841 ==
County Road 841
- Location: Ochopee
- Length: 4.4 mi (7.1 km)

County Road 841 is a short 4.4 mile road through the Big Cypress National Preserve. It is named Birdon Road, and it connects U.S. Route 41 in Ochopee to CR 837 east of Copeland.

== County Road 846 ==
County Road 846
- Location: North Naples–Immokalee
- Length: 43 mi (69 km)

County Road 846 runs over 40 miles through northern Collier County primarily connecting Naples with Immokalee.

== County Road 849 ==
County Road 849
- Location: near Orangetree
- Length: 1.6 mi (2.6 km)

County Road 849 is Sanctuary Road just north of Orangetree. It connects CR 846 with the entrance to Corkscrew Swamp Sanctuary. It was formerly State Road 846A before the 1976 renumbering and SR 849 after until it was relinquished to the county. The SR 849 designation was later reused in 1983 for the Atlantic Boulevard extension in Pompano Beach.

== County Road 850 ==
County Road 850
- Location: Near Immokalee
- Length: 1.6 mi (2.6 km)

County Road 850 is Corkscrew Road in northeastern Collier County. It begins at the Lee-Collier County line east of Immokalee, continuing from the Lee County portion which begins in Estero. It terminates at State Road 82 near Immokalee.

== County Road 851 ==
County Road 851
- Location: Naples
- Length: 9.0 mi (14.5 km)

County Road 851 is one of Collier County's north–south corridors known locally as Goodlette-Frank Road.

=== Route description ===
Goodlette-Frank Road begins in Downtown Naples at US 41 (Tamiami Trail) just west of the Gordon River. From here, it heads north as a six-lane highway passing just east of the community of Lake Park. North of Lake Park, it passes Coastland Center and Naples Zoo before intersecting CR 886 (Golden Gate Parkway). As it continues north, Goodlette-Frank Road leaves Naples city limits and passes a number of residential communities before intersecting CR 896 (Pine Ridge Road). After passing Pine Ridge Road, Goodlette-Frank Road enters the community of North Naples and intersects CR 862 (Vanderbilt Beach Road) before terminating at CR 846 (Immokalee Road).

=== History ===
Goodlette-Frank Road today runs along a route that was historically the Naples area's railroad corridor. The railroad south of Vanderbilt Beach to Downtown Naples was built in 1926 by the Seaboard Air Line Railroad (via their Seaboard–All Florida Railway subsidiary) and was opened in 1927. North of Vanderbilt Beach, track was built by the Atlantic Coast Line Railroad in 1926 as a branch line to Marco Island. In 1944, the Atlantic Coast Line took over the Seaboard Air Line's tracks, linking the two lines at Vanderbilt Beach.

The first segment of Goodlette-Frank Road built was along the railroad from SR 862 (present-day Solana Road) south to 22nd Avenue North near Naples High School in the 1966, providing access to nearby farmland. This segment was named Frank Boulevard after local landowner Ed Frank, who owned about 400 acres of land near the road. Frank also operated an auto repair shop in Naples and was the developer of the original swamp buggy. By the end of the 1960s, Frank Boulevard would extend as far north as present-day Pine Ridge Road.

The addition of another north-south roadway for Collier County had been proposed as early as the 1950s by Collier County Commissioner Dick Goodlette. In the 1960s, Goodlette Road, named in honor of Goodlette, was built along the railroad from US 41 north to connect with Frank Boulevard. A spur of the road, known as Goodlette Extension, would also be built from a point near Naples High School east to Airport Road (present-day Airport-Pulling Road).

Frank Boulevard, Goodlette Extension, and Airport Road would be designated as a spur of SR 951 while Goodlette Road south to US 41 would be designated SR 951A. When the state roads were renumbered in January 1976, Goodlette Road and Frank Boulevard were redesignated SR 851 (and subsequently CR 851 when it was relinquished to county control). In an effort to give the road a unified name, the road was renamed in the mid 1980s by combining the two names into Goodlette-Frank Road. Goodlette Extension would become part of Golden Gate Parkway in 1972.

The Seaboard Coast Line Railroad, the successor of the Atlantic Coast Line, removed the adjacent railroad tracks in 1980. Collier County acquired the railroad's right of way to allow for the expansion of Goodlette-Frank Road. Goodlette-Frank Road was subsequently widened to six lanes from just south of Golden Gate Parkway and four lanes north of there. The southbound lanes between CR 896 (Pine Ridge Road) and Fleischmann Boulevard run along the former railroad right of way.

Goodlette-Frank Road was extended north of Pine Ridge Road along the former railroad corridor to CR 846 (Immokalee Road) by 1992.

Goodlette-Frank Road was widened to six lanes from Golden Gate Parkway to Pine Ridge Road in the mid 2000s.

=== Major intersections ===
Location	mi	km	Destinations	Notes
Naples	0.00	0.00	US 41 (Tamiami Trail / SR 90) – Fort Myers, Miami	Southern terminus
Naples	2.03	3.27	CR 886 (Golden Gate Parkway) – Golden Gate	
	4.76	7.66	CR 896 (Pine Ridge Road)	
North Naples	7.18	11.56	CR 862 (Vanderbilt Beach Road) – Vanderbilt Beach	
North Naples	8.98	14.45	CR 846 (Immokalee Road) – North Naples, Immokalee	Northern terminus
1.000 mi = 1.609 km; 1.000 km = 0.621 mi

== County Road 856 ==
County Road 856
- Location: Naples
- Length: 4.3 mi (6.9 km)

County Road 856 is Radio Road just north of East Naples.

=== Route description ===
Radio Road begins at CR 31 (Airport-Pulling Road) on the east side of Naples Airport. It heads east from here along the northern edge of East Naples. A mile after it begins, Radio Road intersects CR 881 (Livingston Road), which is a major route that heads north into Lee County. From CR 881, Radio Road continues east through residential areas and intersects with Santa Barbara Boulevard before terminating at SR 84 (Davis Boulevard).

=== History ===
The road that would become Radio Road was built in the late 1950s. It was part of SR 858, which ran along present-day Bayshore Drive and Airport-Pulling Road up to the Naples Airport. In the 1960s, SR 858 was extended north along present-day Collier Boulevard.

In 1961, the studio and transmission tower of WNOG was relocated along SR 858 after its original location was flooded by Hurricane Donna. The radio tower led to the road being named Radio Road.

In the late 1960s, SR 84 (Davis Boulevard) was extended east as part of the construction of the original Alligator Alley. The eastern section of Radio Road would become part of Davis Boulevard when SR 84 was complete.

When the area's state roads were renumbered in January 1976, Radio Road was redesignated SR 856. It would then become CR 856 as it is today after it was relinquished to county control. The Florida Department of Transportation subsequently reused the SR 856 designation for William Lehman Causeway in Aventura.

=== Major intersections ===
Location	mi	km	Destinations	Notes
East Naples	0.0	0.0	CR 31 (Airport-Pulling Road)	Western terminus
	1.0	1.6	CR 881 north (Livingston Road)	
	2.9	4.7	Santa Barbara Boulevard	
	4.3	6.9	SR 84 (Davis Boulevard)	Eastern terminus
1.000 mi = 1.609 km; 1.000 km = 0.621 mi

== County Road 858 ==
County Road 858
- Location: Orangetree
- Length: 28.1 mi (45.2 km)

County Road 858 extends east from CR 846 in Orangetree and runs just south of Ave Maria and Immokalee before turning north and running along the Hendry County Line. The east–west segment is known as Oil Well Road and the north–south segment is County Line Road.

=== Route description ===
Oil Well Road begins at CR 846 (Immokaleee Road) in Orangetree. From here, it heads east through rural northeastern Collier County. It passes just south of Ave Maria and Immokalee before it intersects SR 29 near Sunniland. About five miles east of SR 29, CR 858 turns north along County Line Road and runs along the Collier/Hendry County line. After another seven miles, CR 858 terminates at CR 846 just west of the county line.

=== History ===
Oil Well Road was built to provide access to Sunniland, which contained the first commercial oil well in the state of Florida.

Oil Well Road was historically part of SR 858 west of SR 29. Oil Well Road east of SR 29 was historically SR 840 and County Line Road was SR 840A. Prior to the state road renumbering in January 1976, SR 858 extended along a much longer route in Collier County. It previously extended from the west end of Oil Well Road and continued west along present-day Immokalee Road, Collier Boulevard, Davis Boulevard, Radio Road, Airport-Pulling Road, and Bayshore Drive. After the renumbering, those route received separate designations. SR 840 and SR 840A were also decommissioned east of SR 29 during the renumbering and the rest of Oil Well Road and County Line Road were annexed to SR 858. In the early 1980s, SR 858 became CR 858 after it was relinquished to county control. The Florida Department of Transportation subsequently reused the SR 858 designation for Hallandale Beach Boulevard in Broward County.

=== Major intersections ===
Location	mi	km	Destinations	Notes
Orangetree	0.0	0.0	CR 846 (Immokalee Road) – Naples, Immokalee	Western terminus
	15.8	25.4	SR 29 – Immokalee, Everglades City	
	28.1	45.2	CR 846	Eastern terminus
1.000 mi = 1.609 km; 1.000 km = 0.621 mi

== County Road 862 ==
County Road 862
- Location: Vanderbilt Beach
- Length: 10.9 mi (17.5 km)

County Road 862 is Vanderbilt Beach Road, an east–west route through northern Collier County.

=== Route description ===
Vanderbilt Beach Road begins in Vanderbilt Beach along the Gulf of Mexico at Gulf Shore Drive. From here, it heads east as a two-lane road but it expands to a four-lane road after a mile. It then intersects US 41 (Tamiami Trail), passes the Mercato shopping center, and intersects CR 851 (Goodlette-Frank Road). At CR 31 (Airport-Pulling Road), Vanderbilt Beach Road expands to six lanes. It then intersects CR 881 (Livingston Road) and passes under Interstate 75 without an interchange as it heads into more residential part of the county. At CR 951 (Collier Boulevard), Vanderbilt Beach Road is reduced to two-lanes and continues east for about two miles before coming to a dead end at the Greyhawk golf course community and the Olde Florida Golf Club.

=== History ===
Vanberbilt Beach Road west of US 41 was built in 1955 and was designated as SR 862. Solana Road, located about four miles south on US 41, was also a discontinuous segment of SR 862 at the time before being changed to SR 898 in 1976 when the state roads were renumbered. Vanderbilt Beach Road became CR 862 in the 1980s when it was relinquished to county control. The Florida Department of Transportation reused the SR 862 designation as the hidden designation for Interstate 595 near Fort Lauderdale when the first segment of that highway opened in 1988.

The segment of Vanderbilt Beach Road east of CR 31 (Airport-Pulling Road) was built as a discontinuous segment in the 1980s. In 1997, the final segment was built between US 41 and CR 31, linking the two discontinuous segment.

=== Future ===
Collier County is currently extending Vanberbilt Beach Road further east to 16th Street NE. The road is being widened to six lanes from Collier Boulevard to Massey Street and will be realigned onto a new six-lane road just south of the existing road from Massey Street east to Wilson Boulevard. The rest of the extension to 16 Street NE will be a two-lane undivided road.

=== Major intersections ===
Location	mi	km	Destinations	Notes
Vanderbilt Beach	0.00	0.00	Gulf Shore Drive	Western terminus
Vanderbilt Beach	0.3	0.48	CR 901 north (Vanderbilt Drive)	
North Naples	1.3	2.1	US 41 (Tamiami Trail / SR 45) – Fort Myers, Miami	
North Naples	2.3	3.7	CR 851 (Goodlette-Frank Road)	
North Naples	3.5	5.6	CR 31 (Airport-Pulling Road)	
North Naples	4.5	7.2	CR 881 (Livingston Road)	
	6.6	10.6	Logan Boulevard	
	8.5	13.7	CR 951 (Collier Boulevard)	
	10.6	17.1	Greyhawk Trail	Eastern terminus
1.000 mi = 1.609 km; 1.000 km = 0.621 mi

== County Road 864 ==
County Road 864
- Location: East Naples
- Length: 3.8 mi (6.1 km)

County Road 864 is Rattlesnake Hammock Road, an east–west route through East Naples near Lely.

=== Route description ===
Rattlesnake Hammock Road begins at US 41 (Tamiami Trail) just northwest of Lely. From here, it heads east along the north side of Lely and intersects with Santa Barbara Boulevard. CR 864 terminates about two miles later at CR 951 (Collier Boulevard), though Rattlesnake Hammock Road continues east a short distance to access residential communities.

=== History ===
Rattlesnake Hammock Road was once part of SR 864 before being relinquished to county control in the 1980s. Rattlesnake Hammock Road was given its name due to the large amount of rattlesnakes in the area. In the early 2000s, Thomasson Drive was realigned to connect with US 41 at Rattlesnake Hammock Road.

=== Major intersections ===
Location	mi	km	Destinations	Notes
East Naples	0.0	0.0	US 41 (Tamiami Trail / SR 90) – Naples, Miami	Western terminus; continues west as Thomasson Drive
Lely	1.9	3.1	Santa Barbara Boulevard	
	3.8	6.1	CR 951 (Collier Boulevard)	Eastern terminus; continues east as residential street
1.000 mi = 1.609 km; 1.000 km = 0.621 mi

== County Road 876 ==
County Road 876
- Location: Golden Gate Estates
- Length: 10.7 mi (17.2 km)

County Road 876 (CR 876) is Golden Gate Boulevard in Golden Gate Estates.

=== Route description ===
It begins at Collier Boulevard (CR 951) about three miles north of the separate but similarly-named Golden Gate Parkway (CR 886). From Collier Boulevard, Golden Gate Boulevard heads east as a four-lane road into Golden Gate Estates. At Everglades Boulevard, Golden Gate Boulevard is reduced to two lanes. The route ends at Desoto Boulevard.

=== Major intersections ===
Location	mi	km	Destinations	Notes
	0.0	0.0	CR 951 (Collier Boulevard) – Marco Island	
Golden Gate Estates	8.7	14.0	Everglades Boulevard	
Golden Gate Estates	10.7	17.2	Desoto Road	
1.000 mi = 1.609 km; 1.000 km = 0.621 mi

== County Road 881 ==
County Road 881
- Location: Naples
- Length: 11.5 mi (18.5 km)

County Road 881 is Livingston Road, a major north–south corridor between U.S. Route 41 and Interstate 75. It begins at Radio Road and continues north into Lee County.

== County Road 886 ==
County Road 886
- Location: Naples–Golden Gate
- Length: 7.2 mi (11.6 km)

County Road 886 is Golden Gate Parkway, one of the main east–west corridors connecting Naples with Golden Gate.

=== Route description ===
Golden Gate Parkway begins at US 41 in Naples and heads east and runs along the north side of Coastland Center. It passes to the south of Naples High School before intersecting with CR 851 (Goodlette-Frank Road). Continuing east, it passes Freedom Park and the northern trail head for the Gordon River Greenway before coming to a single point urban interchange CR 31 (Airport-Pulling Road). and Interstate 75 as it continues east into Golden Gate Estates, and terminates at CR 951.

=== History ===
The initial segment of Golden Gate Parkway was between present-day Goodlette-Frank and Airport-Pulling Roads (known then as Goodlette Road and Airport Road respectively). It was part of the original alignment of SR 951, which also included Airport Road to the south and Goodlette-Frank Road to the north.

The road was built from Airport Road east to its current eastern terminus in the community of Golden Gate in 1972. The road was officially named Golden Gate Parkway when the extension opened. When the areas state roads were renumbered in 1976, the entire route of Golden Gate Parkway would be designated SR 886. The route became CR 886 when it was relinquished to county control in the early 1980s. The Florida Department of Transportation subsequently reused the SR 886 designation for Port Boulevard in Downtown Miami.

In 1983, Golden Gate Parkway was extended west from Goodlette-Frank Road to US 41 (Tamiami Trail). Golden Gate Parkway's intersection with Goodlette-Frank Road was shifted south a short distance to allow for the extension. A right-turn slip lane was built along Golden Gate Parkway's original alignment to Goodlette-Frank Road in the mid 2000s.

Golden Gate Parkway was upgraded significantly in the mid 2000s. It was widened to six lanes with the addition of the overpass at CR 31 (Airport-Pulling Road). Interchange ramps were also added at Interstate 75 around that time (Golden Gate Parkway previously crossed the interstate without an interchange).

=== Major intersections ===
Location	mi	km	Destinations	Notes
Naples	0.00	0.00	US 41 (Tamiami Trail / SR 45) – Fort Myers, Miami	Western terminus
Naples	0.51	0.82	CR 851 (Goodlette-Frank Road) – Naples	
	2.07	3.33	CR 31 (Airport-Pulling Road) – Naples Municipal Airport	interchange
	3.06	4.92	CR 881 (Livingston Road)	
	4.10	6.60	I-75 (SR 93) – Tampa, Miami	Exit 105 on I-75
Golden Gate	5.06	8.14	Santa Barbara Boulevard	
Golden Gate	7.25	11.67	CR 951 (Collier Boulevard) – Marco Island	Eastern terminus
1.000 mi = 1.609 km; 1.000 km = 0.621 mi

== County Road 887 ==
County Road 887
- Location: North Naples
- Length: 1.5 mi (2.4 km)

County Road 887 is Old 41 Road in North Naples.

=== Route description ===
Old 41 Road begins at US 41 (Tamiami Trail) in North Naples. From here, it heads northeast passing residential communities and the Rail Head Industrial Park. just north of the Rail Head Industrial Park, it crosses into Lee County and Bonita Springs.

=== History ===
Old 41 Road in both Collier and Lee Counties was originally a routing of Tamiami Trail (US 41) through Downtown Bonita Springs. After US 41 was rerouted to its present alignment in 1976, the former route was redesignated SR 887. SR 887 was turned over to county control in both Lee and Collier Counties in the early 1980s. Though, the Lee County segment is now controlled by the City of Bonita Springs and is no longer signed CR 887.

The SR 887 designation has since been reused for the Port Miami Tunnel since its opening on August 3, 2014.

=== Major intersections ===
mi	km	Destinations	Notes
0.0	0.0	US 41 (Tamiami Trail / SR 45) – Fort Myers, Naples	
1.5	2.4	Old 41 Road north (former CR 887)	Continuation into Lee County
1.000 mi = 1.609 km; 1.000 km = 0.621 mi

== County Road 888 ==
County Road 888
- Location: North Naples
- Length: 1.6 mi (2.6 km)

County Road 888 is Wiggins Pass Road in North Naples.

=== Route description ===
Wiggins Pass Road begins at CR 901 (Vanderbilt Drive) near Delnor-Wiggins Pass State Park. From here, it heads east and intersects US 41 (Tamiami Trail). It terminates just a half a mile east of US 41. It dead ends into Cemex's North Naples plant, which is located at the southern terminus of the Seminole Gulf Railway.

=== History ===
Wiggins Pass Road west of US 41 was previously designated SR 865B (Vanderbilt Drive was SR 865A at the time). It was redesignated SR 888 after the state road renumbering in January 1976. It became CR 888 when it was relinquished to county control in the 1980s.

=== Major intersections ===
mi	km	Destinations	Notes
0.0	0.0	CR 901 (Vanderbilt Drive)	
1.3	2.1	US 41 (Tamiami Trail / SR 45) – Fort Myers, Miami	
2.3	3.7	Orchid Court	
1.000 mi = 1.609 km; 1.000 km = 0.621 mi

== County Road 890 ==
County Road 890
- Location: Immokalee
- Length: 3.2 mi (5.1 km)

County Road 890 connects downtown Immokalee with Lake Trafford to the west. It is locally known as Lake Trafford Road.

== County Road 892 ==
County Road 892
- Location: Goodland
- Length: 1.1 mi (1.8 km)

County Road 892 is a short mile-long route on Marco Island connecting CR 92 (San Marco Road) with the community of Goodland. It is locally named Goodland Drive.

== County Road 894 ==
County Road 894
- Location: Immokalee
- Length: 0.5 mi (800 m)

County Road 894 is a short road just north of downtown Immokalee. It is known locally as Experimental Station Road. It runs half a mile east from State Road 29.

== County Road 896 ==
County Road 896
- Location: Naples
- Length: 7.0 mi (11.3 km)

County Road 896 is Pine Ridge Road running just north of Naples and Golden Gate.

=== Route description ===
Pine Ridge Road begins at US 41 (Tamiami Trail) at the northern city limit of Naples. The Waterside Shops are located at the northwest corner of this intersection with the road continuing west from US 41 as Seagate Drive. Pine Ridge Road runs east from US 41 along the southern side of the community Pine Ridge, for which the road is named, before intersecting CR 851 (Goodlette-Frank Road). It continues along the south side of North Naples and intersects two more of Collier County's major north-south routes, CR 31 (Airport-Pulling Road) and CR 881 (Livingston Road). A mile east of Livingston Road, Pine Ridge Road comes to an interchange with Interstate 75. From here, it continues east just north of Golden Gate before coming to its terminus at CR 951 (Collier Boulevard). While CR 896 terminates here, the road continues east as White Boulevard, a residential street.

=== History ===
Pine Ridge Road between US 41 and present-day Airport-Pulling Road was originally a spur of SR 31, connecting it to US 41. SR 31 was the secondary state designation for Airport-Pulling Road. After the state road renumbering in 1976, Pine Ridge Road was redesignated SR 896. SR 896 became CR 896 when it was relinquished to county control in the 1980s.

=== Major intersections ===
Location	mi	km	Destinations	Notes
Naples	0.00	0.00	US 41 (Tamiami Trail / SR 45) – Fort Myers, Miami	Western terminus
Naples	0.51	0.82	CR 851 (Goodlette-Frank Road) – Naples	
	1.99	3.20	CR 31 (Airport-Pulling Road) – Naples Municipal Airport	
	3.04	4.89	CR 881 (Livingston Road)	
	4.00	6.44	I-75 (SR 93) – Tampa, Miami	Exit 107 on I-75
	5.13	8.26	Logan Boulevard	
	7.02	11.30	CR 951 (Collier Boulevard) – Marco Island	Eastern terminus
1.000 mi = 1.609 km; 1.000 km = 0.621 mi

== County Road 898 ==
County Road 898
- Location: Naples
- Length: 0.5 mi (800 m)

County Road 898 is the unsigned designation for Solana Road on the north side of the city of Naples.

=== Route description ===
Solana Road runs for a half mile between US 41 near Park Shore and CR 851 (Goodlette-Frank Road).

=== History ===
Solana Road was originally designated as SR 862. SR 862 was a discontinuous state road at the time, which also included Vanderbilt Beach Road west of US 41. When the state roads were renumbered in 1976, Solana Road was redesignated SR 898 and later CR 898 when it was relinquished to county control. The route is now unsigned.

=== Major intersections ===
Location	mi	km	Destinations	Notes
Naples	0.00	0.00	US 41 (Tamiami Trail / SR 45) – Fort Myers, Miami	Western terminus
Naples	0.51	0.82	CR 851 (Goodlette-Frank Road)	Eastern terminus
1.000 mi = 1.609 km; 1.000 km = 0.621 mi

== County Road 901 ==
County Road 901
- Location: Vanderbilt Beach
- Length: 5.4 mi (8.7 km)

County Road 901, known as Vanderbilt Drive, runs along the coast of northern Collier County.

=== Route description ===
Vanderbilt Drive begins at CR 862 (Vanderbilt Beach Road) in Vanderbilt Beach and runs north. It passes close to Delnor-Wiggins Pass State Park and crosses the Cocohatchee River before terminating just at the Lee-Collier County Line at Bonita Beach Road (Lee County Road 865) in Bonita Springs.

=== History ===
Vanberbilt Drive was first designated as SR 865A in 1966. It was considered a spur of SR 865, which at the time ran along Bonita Beach Road at the north end. When state roads were renumbered in 1976, SR 865A became SR 901. It became CR 901 in the 1980s when it was relinquished to county control.

=== Major intersections ===
County	mi	km	Destinations	Notes
Collier	0.00	0.00	CR 862 (Vanderbilt Beach Road)	Southern terminus of CR 901
Collier	1.34	2.16	CR 846 east (111th Avenue)	
Collier	2.83	4.55	CR 888 east (Wiggins Pass Road)	
Collier–Lee county line	5.35	8.61	CR 865 (Bonita Beach Road)	Northern terminus of CR 901
1.000 mi = 1.609 km; 1.000 km = 0.621 mi

== County Road 951 ==
County Road 951
- Location: East Naples
- Length: 14.7 mi (23.7 km)

County Road 951 is the main north–south route through East Naples and Golden Gate. It begins at U.S. Route 41 in East Naples. Heading north, it intersects State Road 84 and Interstate 75 before running along the eastern side of Golden Gate. It terminates at CR 846 (Immokalee Road). Known as Collier Boulevard, CR 951 was once part of SR 951.

== County Road 952 ==
County Road 952
- Location: Isles of Capri
- Length: 2.6 mi (4.2 km)

County Road 952 is Capri Boulevard, which is the main access to the Isles of Capri near Marco Island.

=== Route description ===
Capri Boulevard begins at the Isles of Capri at Pelican Street and runs northeast. It then turns east and comes to an end at SR 951 (Collier Boulevard).

=== History ===
Capri Boulevard west of present-day Antigua Street on the north side of the Isles of Capri was the southern end of Old Marco Road, a road built in 1912 to provide access to ferry service to Marco Island. This ferry service operated from present-day Isles of Capri until 1938, when the original Goodland Bridge was built providing direct vehicle access to the island. This led to a decline in importance for the Old Marco Road. The northern segment of Old Marco Road is now Barefoot Williams Road near US 41.

Isles of Capri was developed in the 1950s. By then, SR 951 (known then as Isles of Capri Road) was built along the former route of the Atlantic Coast Line Railroad's Marco Island branch to replace Old Marco Road (which was then closed) and Capri Boulevard was connected to it. Capri Boulevard was designated as the south end of SR 951 when it was complete in the late 1950s. When the S.S. Jolley Bridge was built to Marco Island in 1969, the extension of Isles of Capri Road to the bridge was designated SR 951A.

When state roads in Collier County were renumbered in 1976, Capri Boulevard became SR 952 and Isles of Capri Road (now Collier Boulevard) became SR 951 in its entirety. SR 952 became CR 952 when it was relinquished to county control.

=== Major intersections ===
Location	mi	km	Destinations	Notes
	0.0	0.0	Pelican Street	
	2.6	4.2	SR 951 (Collier Boulevard)	
1.000 mi = 1.609 km; 1.000 km = 0.621 mi

== County Road 953 ==
County Road 953
- Location: Marco Island
- Length: 2.6 mi (4.2 km)

County Road 953 is Bald Eagle Drive on Marco Island. It begins at CR 92 (San Marco Road) in the middle of the island and runs north, terminating at Palm Street near the Snook Inn.
