= County Road 846 (Florida) =

County highway in Florida, United States

County Road 846

Route information
- Maintained by Collier County TMS and Hendry County R&BD
- Length: 54.1 mi (87.1 km)

Major junctions
- South end: CR 901 near Naples Park
- US 41 in North Naples; CR 881 near North Naples; I-75 near North Naples; CR 951 near Orangetree; SR 29 in Immokalee
- East end: CR 833 in Hendry County

Location
- Country: United States
- State: Florida
- Counties: Collier, Hendry

Highway system
- County roads in Florida

County Road 846 (CR 846) is a 54-mile-long (87 km) county road in northern Collier County and western Hendry County in Southwest Florida. It primarily connects the Naples area with the agricultural area of Immokalee. A vast majority of the road in Collier County is named Immokalee Road and it is a major commuter route.

== Route description ==
=== North Naples to Immokalee ===
CR 846 begins at CR 901 (Vanderbilt Drive) in North Naples near Delnor-Wiggins Pass State Park. From here, it heads east as a two-lane road along 111th Avenue for a mile (1.6 km) before coming to an intersection with US Highway 41 (US 41, Tamiami Trail). At US 41, it becomes Immokalee Road and expands into a major six-lane roadway. It continues east through North Naples and intersects with CR 851 (Goodlette-Frank Road) and CR 31 (Airport-Pulling Road), both of which head south into central Naples. Further east, it intersects CR 881 (Livingston Road), a major road linking Collier and Lee counties before coming to an interchange with Interstate 75 (I-75).

Beyond I-75, it intersects CR 951 (Collier Boulevard) as it heads into rural Collier County. At Orangetree, it turns north and is reduced to a two-lane rural road and then turns east again as it passes Corkscrew Swamp Sanctuary. Just north of Ave Maria, it turns north again and enters Immokalee along First Street. It passes the Seminole Casino Immokalee and expands to four lanes before coming to an intersection with State Road 29 (SR 29), the main road through Immokalee.

=== East of Immokalee ===
At SR 29 in Immokalee, there is a brief gap in the route. CR 846 resumes at SR 29 two miles (3.2 km) east near Immokalee Regional Airport and heads east as a two-lane road. It passes through more agricultural areas before crossing into Hendry County. In Hendry County, CR 846 continues east nine miles (14 km) before turning north and terminating near Dinner Island Ranch Wildlife Management Area, which is located about 20 miles (32 km) southwest of Clewiston. It terminates at CR 833, a route connecting Hendry County and Broward County.

== History ==
The first segment of what would become CR 846 was built in the late 1940s, extending from Immokalee east to the Hendry County line, and was later added to the state highway system as SR 846. By 1956, SR 846 was extended to its eastern terminus at SR 833 (present-day CR 833).

The first segment of the route west of Immokalee, which extended from Immokalee to a point near Oil Well Grade Road, was built in 1955. By 1958, the route was extended west to US 41 (Tamiami Trail) in North Naples. Upon its completion, the segment west of Immokalee was initially known as the Naples Immokalee Highway before becoming known as Immokalee Road.

SR 846 would also provide access to Corkscrew Swamp Sanctuary, which opened its first boardwalk in 1956. Sanctuary Road, the main entrance road to the sanctuary, was originally designated SR 846A before being redesignated SR 849 in 1976.

By 1973, the SR 846 designation was extended west from US 41 along 111th Avenue to Vanderbilt Drive. A nine-mile (14 km) segment of SR 846 from Immokalee west was rebuilt with wider lanes in 1977.

The interchange between Immokalee Road and I-75 opened in 1981 when the first segment of the freeway opened in Collier County.

SR 846 became CR 846 in the mid-1980s, when the full route was relinquished to county control. Immokalee Road was widened to four lanes between US 41 and I-75 in the early 1990s. It was widened to four lanes from I-75 east to CR 951 (Collier Boulevard) in 2002. Immokalee Road from Oil Well Road (CR 858) west to US 41 would be widened to six lanes by 2008.

== Major intersections ==
County	Location	mi	km	Destinations	Notes
Collier	North Naples	0.0	0.0	CR 901 (Vanderbilt Drive) – Bonita Springs, Vanderbilt Beach	Western terminus
Collier	North Naples	1.0	1.6	US 41 (Tamiami Trail / SR 45) – Fort Myers, Miami	
Collier	North Naples	1.8	2.9	CR 851 south (Goodlette-Frank Road) – Naples	
Collier	North Naples	2.9	4.7	CR 31 south (Airport-Pulling Road)	
Collier	North Naples	4.0	6.4	CR 881 (Livingston Road)	
Collier		4.7	7.6	I-75 (SR 93) – Tampa, Miami	Exit 111 on I-75
Collier		6.0	9.7	Logan Boulevard	
Collier		8.0	12.9	CR 951 south (Collier Boulevard) – Golden Gate, Marco Island	
Collier	Orangetree	14.7	23.7	CR 858 east (Oil Well Road) – Ave Maria	
Collier		20.0	32.2	CR 849 north (Sanctuary Road) – Corkscrew Swamp Sanctuary	Former SR 846A
Collier	Immokalee	33.9	54.6	SR 29 (Main Street) – LaBelle, Everglades City	
Collier		42.9	69.0	CR 858 east (County Line Road)	
Hendry		54.1	87.1	CR 833 (Sam Jones Trail)	Eastern terminus
1.000 mi = 1.609 km; 1.000 km = 0.621 mi
