= County Road 881 (Florida) =

County road in Florida, United States

County Road 881

Route information
- Maintained by Lee County DOT, Collier County TMS, and the city of Bonita Springs
- Length: 29.3 mi (47.2 km)

Major junctions
- South end: CR 856 near Naples
- CR 896 near Naples; CR 846 near Naples; CR 865 in Bonita Springs; CR 850 in Estero; CR 840 in Three Oaks
- North end: CR 876 near Fort Myers

Location
- Country: United States
- State: Florida
- Counties: Collier, Lee

Highway system
- County roads in Florida

County Road 881 (CR 881) is a major thoroughfare in Southwest Florida. It is one of three major routes connecting Collier and Lee counties along with US Highway 41 (US 41, Tamiami Trail) and Interstate 75 (I-75). Locally, it is known as Livingston Road in Collier County and Imperial Parkway and Three Oaks Parkway in Lee County. The route is fully signed in Collier County, but is only signed sparingly in Lee County (though it is indicated on county maps).

CR 881 is maintained by the respective counties except for the segment between Bonita Beach Road (CR 865) and East Terry Street, which is maintained by the city of Bonita Springs.

== Route description ==
=== Collier County ===
CR 881 begins as a six-lane road at Radio Road (CR 856) just east of Naples Airport. About 1.5 miles (2.4 km) after it begins, it intersects with Golden Gate Parkway (CR 886), which connects Naples with Golden Gate. It continues north and intersects Pine Ridge Road (CR 896) where it enters North Naples. Livingston Road passes North Collier Regional Park shortly before its intersection with Immokalee Road (CR 846). At Veterans Memorial Boulevard, Livingston Road is reduced to four lanes and passes the Mediterra community before crossing into Lee County.

=== Lee County ===
Upon entering Lee County, CR 881 becomes Imperial Parkway. A mile north of the county line, Imperial Parkway intersects with Bonita Beach Road (CR 865), the main east–west thoroughfare through Bonita Springs. After intersecting Bonita Beach Road, Imperial Parkway continues north and crosses the Imperial River and winds through some residential neighborhoods before running directly beside I-75 as it heads north toward Estero. As it enters Estero, Imperial Parkway shifts to the west and intersects with Coconut Road, where it becomes Three Oaks Parkway.

From Coconut Road, Three Oaks Parkway continues north through the Brooks neighborhood and comes to an intersection with Corkscrew Road (CR 850), the main east–west thoroughfare through Estero. From Corkscrew Road, it continues north through the community of Three Oaks.

After intersecting with Alico Road (CR 840), Three Oaks Parkway continues north. North of the airport canal, it runs directly beside Interstate 75 before coming to its northern terminus at Daniels Parkway (CR 876) just north of the Fiddlesticks neighborhood. At Daniels Parkway, the road continues north as Palomino Lane, a residential street.

== History ==
County Road 881 became a major thoroughfare in the 2000s, and was created from connecting various local streets. Imperial Parkway in Bonita Springs (originally known as Imperial Street) was an early local street between Terry Street and Oak Creek dating back to the early 1900s. Imperial Street was also one of the first crossings of the Imperial River, even predating the Tamiami Trail's crossing of the river. In Collier County, Livingston Road originally existed as a two-lane residential road north of Pine Ridge Road (much of this segment is now the parallel Old Livingston Road).

The first segment of Three Oaks Parkway in Lee County between Alico Road (CR 840) and Corkscrew Road (CR 850) opened in April 1988. The two-lane road was originally named Corlico Parkway (a portmanteau of Corkscrew and Alico) but was later changed to Three Oaks Parkway within a year of opening. It was built by the developers of the residential community of Three Oaks.

In the early 2000s, a four-lane extension of Three Oaks Parkway was built south from Corkscrew Road to just south of Coconut Road. The extension from Williams Road south was built by Bonita Bay Properties, the developers of The Brooks neighborhood (who also built Coconut Road). Lee County built the remaining segment north of Williams Road to Corkscrew Road.

Livingston Road was rebuilt and extended to its full length segmentally in the early 2000s and was fully complete by 2005. The expanded Livingston Road was built as a six-lane road from Radio Road to Immokalee Road and a two-lane road further north (which was widened to six lanes a few years later). The segment of Imperial Parkway from the Collier County line to Bonita Beach Road (CR 865) was built in 2000 as a two-lane road by Bonita Bay Properties, the developer of the Mediterra community. This segment was also widened to four lanes a few years later.

The two segments of CR 881 were linked in the late 2000s. The city of Bonita Springs expanded Imperial Parkway from a residential street to a four-lane road from Bonita Beach Road to East Terry Street (which was also widened at the same time). Imperial Parkway was then extended north from East Terry Street to Coconut Road in Estero to connect with Three Oaks Parkway in 2008.

Also in 2008, the original segment of Three Oaks Parkway from Corkscrew Road to Alico Road was widened to four lanes. The widening also realigned a portion of Three Oaks Parkway to run beside Interstate 75. The original alignment is now Pine Chase Drive.

In 2010, Three Oaks Parkway was extended on the north end from Alico Road a short distance to a dead end at the airport canal. This segment was built by a private developer. Three Oaks Parkway was extended at the north end from the airport canal to Daniels Parkway on November 2, 2026.

== Major intersections ==
County	Location	mi	km	Destinations	Notes
Collier		0.00	0.00	CR 856 (Radio Road)	Southern terminus
Collier		1.41	2.27	CR 886 (Golden Gate Parkway) to I-75 / US 41 – Golden Gate	
Collier		4.00	6.44	CR 896 (Pine Ridge Road) to I-75 / US 41	
Collier	North Naples	6.22	10.01	CR 862 (Vanderbilt Beach Road) – Vanderbilt Beach	
Collier	North Naples	8.21	13.21	CR 846 (Immokalee Road) to I-75 / US 41 – North Naples, Immokalee	
Lee	Bonita Springs	12.44	20.02	CR 865 (Bonita Beach Road) to I-75 / US 41	
Lee	Estero	20.54	33.06	CR 850 (Corkscrew Road) to I-75 / US 41	
Lee	Three Oaks	25.01	40.25	CR 840 (Alico Road) to I-75 / US 41	
Lee		29.20	46.99	CR 876 (Daniels Parkway) to I-75 / US 41	Northern terminus
1.000 mi = 1.609 km; 1.000 km = 0.621 mi
