= Collier Boulevard =

State highway in Florida, United States

Collier Boulevard
- State Road 951 and County Road 951
- SR 951 in red, CR 951 in blue, city-controlled portion in grey

Route information
- Maintained by FDOT, Collier County TMS, and the city of Marco Island
- Length: 26.8 mi (43.1 km)

Major junctions
- South end: Marco Island
- US 41 near Naples Manor; SR 84 near Naples; I-75 near Golden Gate
- North end: CR 846 near Orangetree

Location
- Country: United States
- State: Florida
- County: Collier

Highway system
- Florida State Highway System; Interstate; US; State; Former; Pre‑1945; Toll; Scenic
← SR 949	→ SR 953

Collier Boulevard is a nearly 27-mile-long (43 km) north–south divided highway that extends from the south end of Marco Island through central Collier County to CR 846 (Immokalee Road) north of Golden Gate. State-maintained segments of Collier Boulevard are designated as State Road 951 (SR 951), which previously existed over the entire route from CR 92 on Marco Island to CR 846. County-maintained segments are County Road 951 (CR 951), which were relinquished from state control in the 1980s.

Due to a numbering anomaly within the Florida Department of Transportation’s numbering system of State Roads, SR 951 is the only SR 9xx highway that is not in Miami-Dade County: Krome Avenue (SR 997) lies 78 miles (126 km) to the east; the similarly numbered SR 953 (LeJeune Road) is another 12.5 miles (20.1 km) to the east of SR 997.

== Route description ==
Collier Boulevard begins as a four-lane city road on Marco Island near Caxambas Pass, and it runs north along the west side of Marco Island. Collier Boulevard becomes a state road at the south end of the S.S. Jolley Bridge with the designation SR 951. After crossing the S.S. Jolley Bridge, SR 951 passes through marshland and woodland as it heads north on the mainland. It intersects CR 952 (Capri Boulevard), the main road to Isles of Capri and Mainsail Drive, which provides access to Marco Island Airport. Further north, the road passes by some newer housing and country club developments and expands to six lanes before it intersects with US 41 (Tamiami Trail).

At US 41, Collier Boulevard becomes CR 951 and continues north. It passes to the east of East Naples and Lely before coming to an intersection with SR 84 (Davis Boulevard). At SR 84, Collier Boulevard briefly switches back to state maintenance (SR 951) as it passes through an interchange with Interstate 75 (Alligator Alley). Just north of I-75, Collier Boulevard again switches to county control (CR 951) and it is reduced to four lanes.

After passing just east of the community of Golden Gate, Collier Boulevard continues north another six miles before coming to its northern terminus at CR 846 (Immokalee Road) just west of Orangetree.

== History ==
The first segment of Collier Boulevard (known then as Isles of Capri Road) south of U.S. Route 41 (Tamiami Trail) was built around 1955 during the development of the Isles of Capri. The Isles of Capri Road would be designated SR 951. This segment was built upon the abandoned rail bed of the Atlantic Coast Line Railroad's Marco Island branch (which existed from 1927 to 1944) and would replace an earlier road to the area that was built around 1912. The original road, known as Old Marco Road, ran just to the west of SR 951 and historically provided access to a ferry service to Marco Island, which launched from present-day Isles of Capri. The ferry service was discontinued in 1938 when the original Goodland Bridge was built further east and the road's importance diminished. Present-day Capri Boulevard (CR 952) east to its connection with the Old Marco Road at Antigua street, was also built at this time and was designated as the southern end of SR 951. A small section of Old Marco Road is still in service at the north end and is now Barefoot Williams Road.

The northern section of Collier Boulevard from present-day SR 84 to Immokalee Road (CR 846) was built by 1960. It was built as part of a northern extension of SR 858 (present-day Radio Road). By 1963, SR 951 was extended north from US 41 to connect with SR 858. At this point, SR 951 became a discontinuous route at SR 858, with SR 951 resuming at SR 858 further east heading north along present-day Airport-Pulling Road, Golden Gate Parkway, and Goodlette-Frank Road.

The road was extended south from Isles of Capri to Marco Island in 1969 when the Marco River Bridge (known today as the S.S. Jolley Bridge) was built. The route south across the bridge was designated SR 951B when it opened.

Many state roads in Collier County were re-designated on January 5, 1976. SR 951 was then designated as a secondary state road from Marco Island (at State Road 92) northward along the former SR 858 to an intersection with the then-State Road 846 (now County Road 846). The discontinuous segment of SR 951 received different designations. The state road designation of the northernmost 14 miles (23 km) of SR 951 were phased out in the 1980s as they were relinquished to county control.

The southern section of the road was still known as Isles of Capri Road until 2000, when the full road from Marco Island to Immokalee Road was officially named Collier Boulevard.

State Road 951 formerly extended 2.6 miles (4.2 km) to the south, terminating at County Road 92 (San Marco Road) in Marco Island. This section was turned over to the city of Marco Island on November 29, 2004.

== Major intersections ==
The entire route is in Collier County.

Location	mi	km	Destinations	Notes
Marco Island	0.000	0.000	San Marco Road (CR 92 east) – Goodland	
Marco Island	1.5	2.4	Bald Eagle Drive (CR 953)	
Marco Island	2.606	4.194	Foot of Jolley Bridge	Southern end of state maintenance
	2.76	4.44	Judge S.S. Jolley Bridge over Big Marco Pass	
	4.135	6.655	CR 952 west (Capri Boulevard) – Isles of Capri	
	9.678	15.575	US 41 (SR 90)	Northern end of state maintenance
	13.2	21.2	CR 864 west (Rattlesnake Hammock Road)	
	16.205	26.079	SR 84 west (Davis Boulevard) – Naples	Southern end of state maintenance
	16.59	26.70	I-75 (SR 93) – Tampa, Miami	I-75 exit 101
	16.843	27.106	Northern end of state maintenance	
Golden Gate	18.3	29.5	CR 886 west (Golden Gate Parkway)	
	20.3	32.7	CR 896 west (Pine Ridge Road) to I-75	
	22.4	36.0	Vanderbilt Beach Road (CR 862)	
	24.351	39.189	CR 846 (Immokalee Road) to I-75 / US 41 north – Naples Park, Immokalee	
1.000 mi = 1.609 km; 1.000 km = 0.621 mi: Route transition
