= Alico Road =

County road in Florida, United States

Alico Road
- County Road 840

Route information
- Maintained by Lee County DOT
- Length: 11.1 mi (17.9 km)

Major junctions
- West end: US 41 near San Carlos Park
- SR 739 near San Carlos Park; I-75 near Three Oaks
- East end: CR 850 near Estero

Location
- Country: United States
- State: Florida
- County: Lee

Highway system
- County roads in Florida; County roads in Lee County

Alico Road, also designated as County Road 840 (CR 840), is an east–west thoroughfare in Lee County, Florida, just north of San Carlos Park. It is a major commuter route and provides access to Florida Gulf Coast University and Southwest Florida International Airport.

== Route description ==
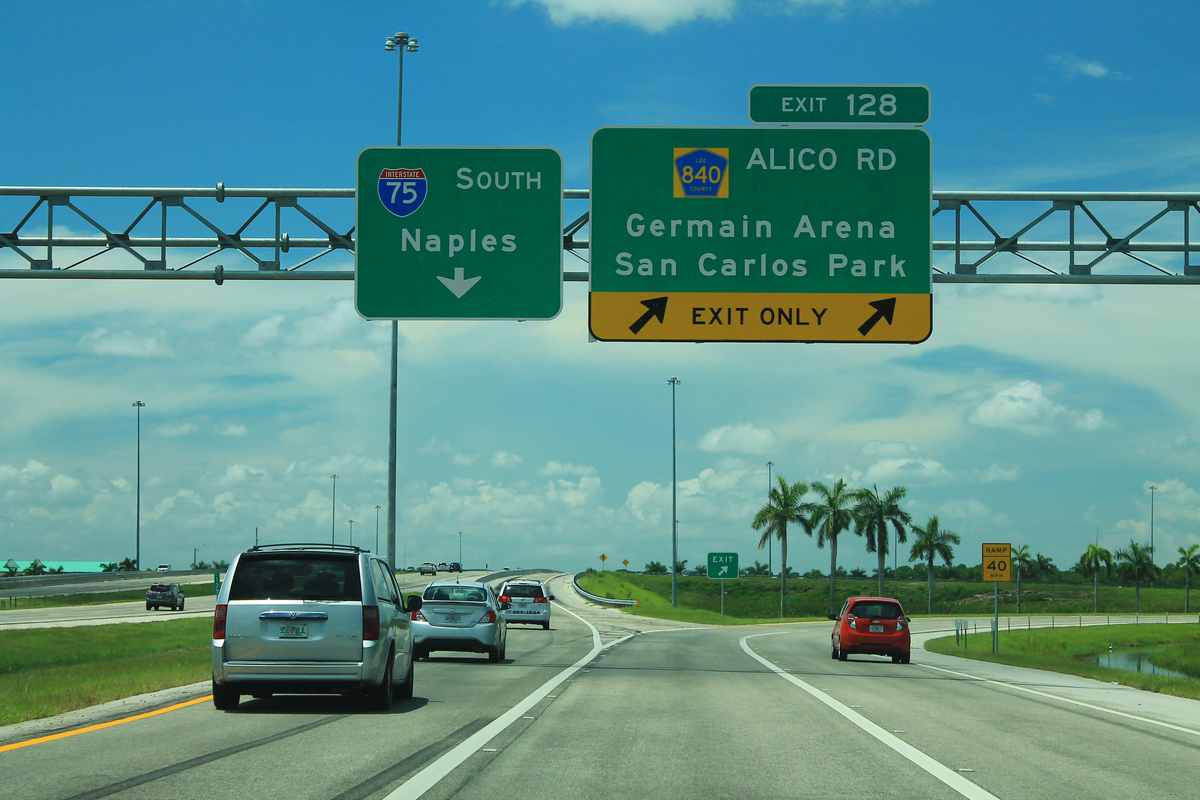
I-75 ramps approaching Alico Road (CR 840)

Alico Road begins at US Highway 41 (US 41, Tamiami Trail) just north of San Carlos Park. From US 41, it heads east as a four-lane road, but becomes a six-lane road at the interchange with State Route 739 (SR 739, Michael G. Rippe Parkway). It continues east along the northern boundaries of San Carlos Park and Three Oaks before coming to an interchange with Interstate 75 (I-75).

Just east of I-75, Alico Road passes Gulf Coast Town Center and then intersects with CR 885 (Ben Hill Griffin Parkway), which provides access to Florida Gulf Coast University to the south and Southwest Florida International Airport to the north.

Beyond CR 885, Alico Road is reduced to four lanes as it travels along the south side of Southwest Florida International Airport. It is reduced to a two-lane undivided road at Airport Haul Road and turns south before coming to an end at Corkscrew Road (CR 850).

The road is maintained by the Lee County Department of Transportation (LCDOT), except for the I-75 interchange, which is maintained by the Florida Department of Transportation (FDOT).

== History ==
Alico Road originally was a rural dirt road connecting Tamiami Trail (US 41) to agricultural and industrial land to the east. Much of this land was owned by the Alico Land Development Company, for which the road is named. The name Alico is an acronym of Atlantic Land and Improvement Company, the company's name prior to 1960 when it was a subsidiary of the Atlantic Coast Line Railroad (the company that built most of Southwest Florida's railroad network).

Rock mines were prevalent along Alico Road in its early days. In the late 1960s, a rock mine was located near Alico Road and US 41. This mine was operated by West Coast Rock Company until 1971, when it was acquired by Shands and Baker, Inc. (which later became Florida Rock Industries). In 1973, Florida Rock Industries leased 2,000 acres (810 ha) from Alico six miles (9.7 km) further east for a larger rock mine. The Seaboard Coast Line Railroad (the Atlantic Coast Line's successor) built a railroad spur along Alico Road to serve the mine.

Alico Road would also gain more prominence as the community of San Carlos Park expanded in the 1970s and the road was paved by 1980.

As I-75 was being planned in the early 1970s, initial plans did not include an interchange with Alico Road. An interchange was added to the plans as residential and industrial growth in San Carlos Park continued. I-75 opened through Southwest Florida in 1979, though its interchange with Alico Road did not open until February 1981. The interchange was originally a folded diamond interchange with all of its ramps on the south side due to the railroad spur.

The easternmost 3.5 miles (5.6 km) of the parallel railroad spur were removed in 1994 by Seminole Gulf Railway, who took over Southwest Florida's railroad network in 1987. The remaining railroad spur now ends at Domestic Avenue.

Alico Road continued to become a major commuter thoroughfare in the 1990s and in the early 2000s, work began to widen the road. In 2005, LCDOT completed widening Alico Road to six lanes from just east of the Seminole Gulf Railway main line crossing to Three Oaks Parkway (CR 881). At the end of 2007, FDOT completed widening the road to six lanes from Three Oaks Parkway to Ben Hill Griffin Parkway (CR 885), which also rebuilt the interchange with I-75 as a partial cloverleaf interchange with ramps in all four corners. In 2008, FDOT realigned Alico Road from the railroad tracks to US 41, moving its intersection with US 41 north a quarter of a mile (0.4 km). The four-lane realignment also included part of the ramps for the SR 739 extension and interchange (which was built in 2012).

A two-mile (3.2 km) stretch of Alico Road east of Ben Hill Griffin Parkway was widened to four lanes in 2021 due to residential development.

== Future ==
Lee County is currently developing plans for an extension of Alico Road that would continue it past its southern turn to Corkscrew Road and continue it east to SR 82. The existing north–south segment connecting to Corkscrew Road would then become a separate road.

== Major intersections ==
The entire road is in Lee County.

Location	mi	km	Destinations	Notes
	0.00	0.00	US 41 (Tamiami Trail)	
San Carlos Park	0.40	0.64	SR 739 north (Michael G. Rippe Parkway)	Westbound exit and eastbound entrance; interchange
Three Oaks	3.10	4.99	CR 881 (Three Oaks Parkway)	
Three Oaks	3.50	5.63	I-75 – Tampa, Naples	Exit 128 on I-75
	4.20	6.76	CR 885 (Ben Hill Griffin Parkway) – Southwest Florida International Airport	
	11.10	17.86	CR 850 (Corkscrew Road) to I-75 / US 41	
1.000 mi = 1.609 km; 1.000 km = 0.621 mi: Incomplete access
