= Florida State Road 84 =

Highway in Florida

State Road 84
- Florida State Road 84 highlighted in red

Route information
- Maintained by FDOT
- Length: 26.24 mi (42.23 km) 6.464 mi (10.40 km) in Collier County; 19.776 mi (31.83 km) in Broward County

Collier County section
- West end: US 41 in Naples
- East end: SR 951 / CR 951 near Golden Gate

Broward County section
- West end: I-75 in Weston
- Major intersections: I-595 from Sunrise to Davie; Florida's Turnpike / US 441 in Davie; I-95 in Fort Lauderdale; US 1 / SR A1A in Fort Lauderdale
- East end: Miami Road in Fort Lauderdale

Location
- Country: United States
- State: Florida
- Counties: Collier, Broward

Highway system
- Florida State Highway System; Interstate; US; State; Former; Pre‑1945; Toll; Scenic
← SR 83	→ SR 85

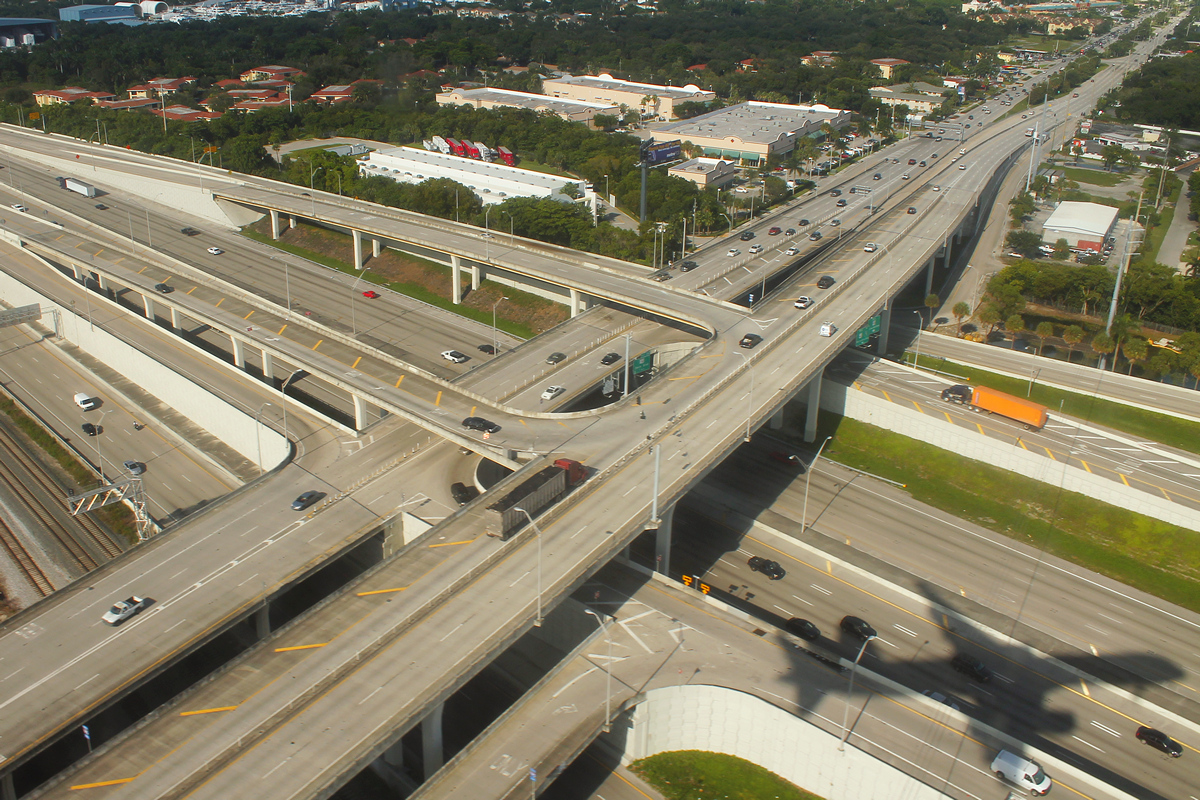
An aerial view of the interchange of FL 84 at I-95.

State Road 84 (SR 84) is a highway in the U.S. state of Florida originally extending from Tamiami Trail (U.S. Route 41) in Naples to U.S. Route 1 in Fort Lauderdale. The road consists of two noncontiguous pieces––in Collier County as Davis Boulevard and in Broward County as Marina Mile Boulevard and highway frontage roads.

== Route description ==
=== Collier County segment ===
A 7-mile-long section exists in Collier County, Florida, beginning at Tamiami Trail (US 41) in Naples. It travels east along Davis Boulevard, passing through the neighborhood of East Naples. This section has an eastern terminus at Collier Boulevard, where state maintenance of State Road 951 to the north transitions to the county as County Road 951 to the south, near Exit 101 of Interstate 75 (Alligator Alley) south of Golden Gate. East of SR / CR 951, the road is known as Beck Boulevard, a local road.

From 1969 until the completion of Interstate 75 in 1993, SR 84 was a primary route through Alligator Alley across the southern Florida peninsula.

=== Broward County segment ===
A 12-mile-long stretch in Broward County, Florida that is now primarily a service road for Interstate 595 (SR 862), with the westbound lanes adjacent to the New River Canal. The easternmost three miles (5 km) comprise a divided four-lane highway traversing a Fort Lauderdale neighborhood mostly known as Marina Mile Boulevard (though the most eastern mile of SR 84 is also known as Southeast 24th Street). The present I-595 follows the original route of SR 84 west of the split between the two roads.

== History ==
In the 1960s, Tamiami Trail was becoming insufficient to handle the rapidly growing traffic between Tampa and South Florida, and adding lanes to the road that was once considered a major engineering feat was not feasible in light of the demands of nearby Everglades National Park and the Miccosukee Tribe living near the Trail. It was finally decided that a second transpeninsular road would be best to serve the need of motorists to go from “coast to coast” south of Lake Okeechobee, the new one featuring a toll limited access two-lane expressway, the "Everglades Parkway" (the original name of the road that became better known as “Alligator Alley”).

Construction began on Alligator Alley in the early 1960s. On the Naples side, the route would connect with Davis Boulevard, which was previously a local road running from US 41 to Airport Road (CR 31). Davis Boulevard was named for George Davis, one of the Naples area's first attorneys who built one of the first houses along the road near Shadowlawn Drive.

Maps in the late 1960s indicated that Alligator Alley would be designated State Road 838, a designation which runs along Sunrise Boulevard in Fort Lauderdale. Though, when the highway was completed and opened on February 11, 1968, the State Road 84 designation and signs were placed along the entire length of the road (101 miles or 162.54 kilometres) from Naples to Fort Lauderdale.

Two decades later, the southern extension of Interstate 75 from Tampa was moving forward with earnest, as was the construction of Interstate 595. Because the population and traffic of southern Broward County were growing at a fast rate, Interstate 595 was being built to improve the connections between the Alley and US 1 (and improve access to Port Everglades and Fort Lauderdale-Hollywood International Airport), and the eastbound lanes of SR 84 were shifted southward to accommodate the new expressway that runs down what once was a large grassy median with limited cross-overs/turnarounds for SR 84. I-595 was opened to traffic in the mid-1980s.

When four-laning of Alligator Alley was completed to Interstate highway and environmental standards (several tunnels were constructed at various points under the road for the critically endangered Florida Panther), signs along the toll road identifying it as SR 84 were removed, and I-75 signs went up to replace them in early 1993. While the SR 84 could have remained the hidden designation of the road, the Florida Department of Transportation decided to supersede it with the hidden designation already in place for I-75 in most of the state: SR 93. This created the disconnection of SR 84 that exists to the present day.

A short local road that was once part of SR 84 east of Collier Boulevard connecting it to Alligator Alley is now known as Beck Boulevard. It was named in honor of Edward J. Beck, a former toll collector on the original Alligator Alley who was murdered on the job on January 30, 1974. The Collier County Commission renamed the road in honor of Beck in 2000. At the same time, the state also dedicated the current Alligator Alley toll plaza to Beck's memory.

== Major intersections ==
County	Location	mi	km	Destinations	Notes
Collier	Naples	0.000	0.000	US 41 north (5th Avenue)	
Collier	Naples	0.277	0.446	Commercial Drive to US 41 south	
Collier	East Naples	1.005	1.617	CR 31 (Airport–Pulling Road)	
Collier		4.050	6.518	Santa Barbara Boulevard	
Collier		5.770	9.286	CR 856 west (Radio Road)	East end of CR 856
Collier		6.464	10.403	CR 951 south / SR 951 north (Collier Boulevard) to I-75 – Marco Island, Golden Gate	Termini of CR 951 and SR 951
Gap in route, connection made via 79.22 miles (127.49 kilometres) of I-75
Broward	Weston	0.000– 0.298	0.000– 0.480	I-75 / Glades Parkway south	Exit 22 on I-75
Broward	Weston	1.212	1.951	I-75 / Indian Trace south – Weston, Miami	Exit 21 on I-75
Broward	Weston	3.259	5.245	Bonaventure Boulevard south	
Broward	Sunrise–Weston– Davie tripoint	3.798	6.112	I-595 / Weston Road south to I-75 south – Markham Park	
Broward	Sunrise–Weston– Davie tripoint			Southwest 148th Avenue south	Eastbound exit, eastbound entrance
Broward	Davie–Plantation line	5.804	9.341	I-595 east / 136th Avenue to SR 869 (Sawgrass Expressway)	Exit 1 on I-595
Broward	Davie–Plantation line	6.859	11.038	I-595 / SR 823 south (Flamingo Road) – Sawgrass Mills Mall	Exit 2 on I-595
Broward	Davie–Plantation line	7.880	12.682	I-595 / Hiatus Road	Exit 3 on I-595
Broward	Davie–Plantation line	8.898	14.320	I-595 / Nob Hill Road	Exit 4 on I-595
Broward	Davie–Plantation line	9.950	16.013	I-595 / Pine Island Road	Exit 5 on I-595
Broward	Davie–Plantation line	10.917	17.569	I-595 / SR 817 (University Drive) – South Florida Education Center	Exit 6 on I-595
Broward	Davie–Plantation line	12.445	20.028	I-595 / Davie Road south – South Florida Education Center	Exit 7 on I-595
Broward	Davie–Plantation line	12.819	20.630	I-595 west to I-75 / SR 869	West end of concurrency with I-595
Broward	Davie–Plantation line	13.072	21.037	Florida's Turnpike – Miami, Orlando	Exit 54 on Turnpike; signed as exit 8 eastbound
Broward	Davie–Fort Lauderdale– Broadview Park tripoint	14.070	22.643	US 441 (SR 7)	Signed as exits 9A (north) and 9B (south) eastbound
Broward	Davie–Fort Lauderdale– Broadview Park tripoint	14.186	22.830	I-595 east – Airport, Port	East end of concurrency with I-595
Broward	Fort Lauderdale	16.705	26.884	South Fork New River drawbridge	
Broward	Fort Lauderdale	17.722	28.521	I-95 – Miami, West Palm Beach	Exit 25 on I-95
Broward	Fort Lauderdale	19.720	31.736	US 1 / SR A1A – Downtown, Beaches, Hollywood, Airport	
Broward	Fort Lauderdale	19.776	31.826	Miami Road / 24th Street east – Port Everglades, Convention Center	Terminus of state maintenance
1.000 mi = 1.609 km; 1.000 km = 0.621 mi: Concurrency terminus
