= Corkscrew Road =

Road in Florida, United States

Corkscrew Road
- County Road 850

Route information
- Maintained by Lee County DOT and Collier County TMS
- Length: 20.9 mi (33.6 km)

Major junctions
- West end: US 41 in Estero
- CR 881 in Estero; I-75 in Estero; CR 885 in Estero
- East end: SR 82 near Immokalee

Location
- Country: United States
- State: Florida
- Counties: Lee, Collier

Highway system
- County roads in Florida

Corkscrew Road, also designated as County Road 850 (CR 850), is a major road in Southwest Florida running from Estero in Lee County east to a point near Immokalee in Collier County. The western section is the primary east–west road in Estero.

== Route description ==
CR 850 begins at US Highway 41 (US 41, Tamiami Trail) in Estero, just across from the Koreshan State Historic Site, and heads east. While not part of CR 850, Corkscrew Road does extend a half mile (0.8 km) west of US 41 as a city street accessing a residential neighborhood and the Koreshan State Historic Site.

From US 41, Corkscrew Road (CR 850) proceeds east as a four-lane divided road through Estero. About 1.5 miles (2.4 km) east of US 41, CR 850 intersects Three Oaks Parkway (CR 881), a major north–south corridor connecting Lee and Collier counties. A half a mile (0.8 km) later, CR 850 turns north-northeast and comes to an interchange with Interstate 75 (I-75).

Just east of I-75, CR 850 passes Miromar Outlets and intersects with Ben Hill Griffin Parkway (CR 885), which provides access to Florida Gulf Coast University to the north. CR 850 turns back east near the Bella Terra neighborhood, where it is reduced to a two-lane road.

It continues east through rural Lee County. As turns northeast as it enters Collier County. It runs northeast along the north side of Corkscrew Regional Ecosystem Watershed (CREW) before coming to its eastern terminus at State Road 82 (SR 82) near Immokalee.

== History ==
The route was first commissioned as a state road in 1935 with the designation SR 276. It became SR 850 ten years later during the 1945 Florida State Road renumbering. It was then transferred to county control in 1980. All of CR 850 is maintained by its respective counties, except for the interchange with I-75, which is maintained by the Florida Department of Transportation.

The Florida Department of Transportation reused the SR 850 designation from 1980 to 1983 for 103rd Street and 49th Street in Miami-Dade County. In 1983, 103rd Street became SR 932, and the SR 850 designation has since been used for the state-controlled segment of Northlake Boulevard in Palm Beach Gardens.

== Future ==
Corkscrew Road is currently being widened to four lanes from the Bella Terra neighborhood east to Alico Road.

== Major intersections ==
County	Location	mi	km	Destinations	Notes
Lee	Estero	0.00	0.00	US 41 (Tamiami Trail)	
Lee	Estero	1.40	2.25	CR 881 (Three Oaks Parkway)	
Lee	Estero	2.00	3.22	I-75 – Tampa, Naples	Exit 123 on I-75
Lee	Estero	2.60	4.18	CR 885 north (Ben Hill Griffin Parkway)	Southern terminus of CR 885
Lee		7.00	11.27	CR 840 west (Alico Road)	Eastern terminus of CR 840
Collier		20.9	33.6	SR 82	
1.000 mi = 1.609 km; 1.000 km = 0.621 mi
