= Three Oaks =

Three Oaks may refer to:

- Three Oaks, East Sussex, England
  - Three Oaks railway station, East Sussex
- Three Oaks, Florida, USA
- Three Oaks, Michigan, USA
- Three Oaks Township, Michigan, USA
