= Isles of Capri, Florida =

Unincorporated community in Florida, US

Coordinates: 25°58′58″N 81°43′39″W

Isles of Capri is an island community located in unincorporated Collier County, Florida. The isles are a grouping of four mangrove islands that were developed and connected in the 1950s. The isles are connected by Capri Boulevard, and can be accessed from nearby SR 951 (Collier Boulevard). Isles of Capri is located just north of Marco Island.

== Background ==
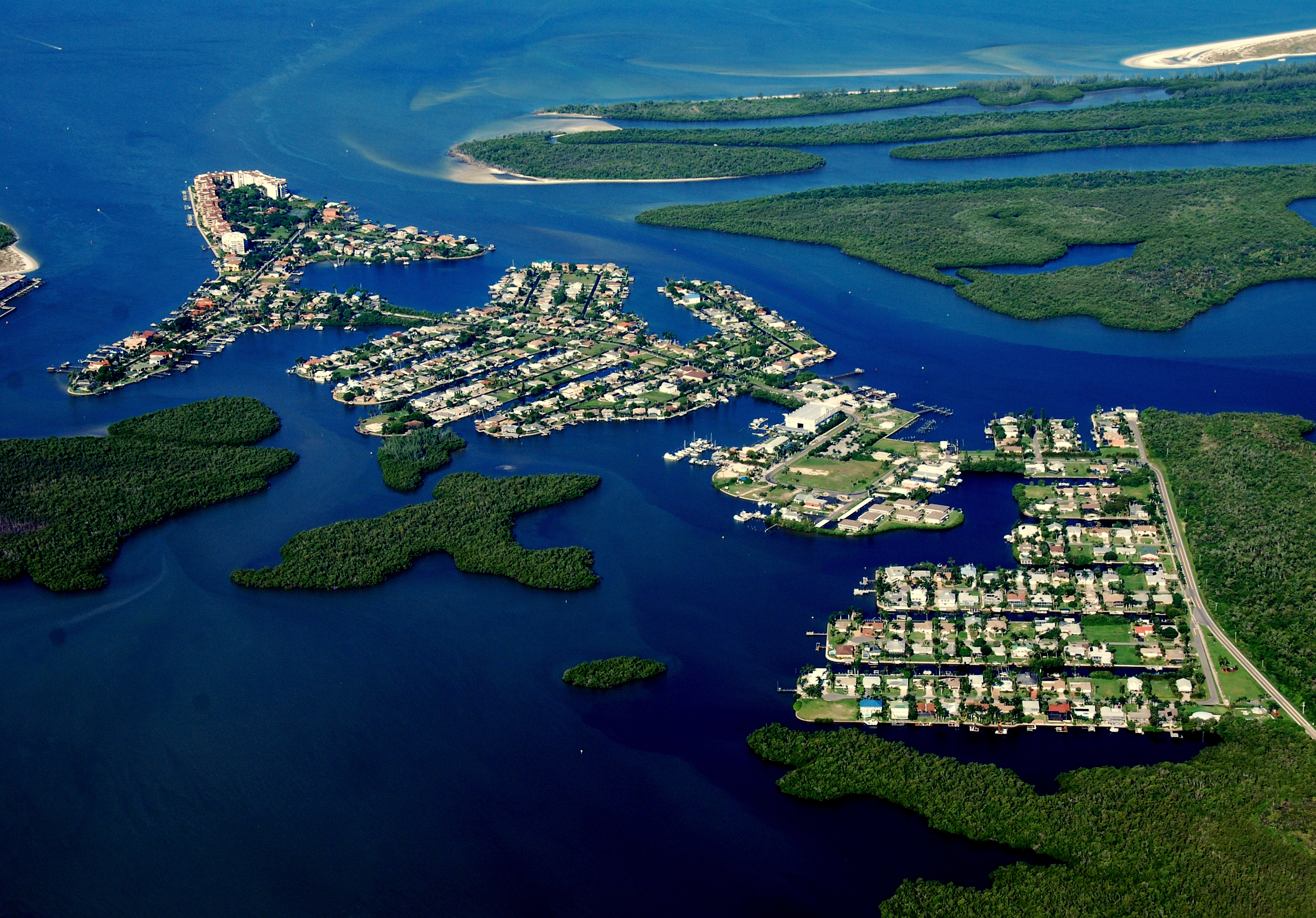
Isles Of Capri, aerial view

Leland L. "Doc" Loach purchased four mangrove islands in 1955. Soon after, the isles were dredged and connected to form its current configuration.

Today, Isles of Capri is a vacation, boating and fishing community, evidenced by the numerous docks and a large marina located on the isles. Residents and visitors are attracted to the Isles by water activities and canal, bay and Gulf of Mexico views. Like Collier County, the island has both a permanent and seasonal population. The population drops significantly in the summer.

While much of Isles of Capri is residential, what the locals call the "commercial island" is the home to multiple restaurants, marinas and real estate offices.

La Peninsula, a condominium community made up of seven individual complexes, sits at the southwestern tip of Isles of Capri.

== Geography and climate ==
Much of Isles of Capri sits in the Rookery Bay preserve. The isles are surrounded by shallow saltwater bays. A broad array of fish, manatees and bottlenose dolphins live in the water around the isles.

Located south of Naples and along the coast of the Gulf of Mexico, Isles of Capri features a tropical climate with a pronounced dry season from November through April. Daytime highs range from the mid 70s Fahrenheit in January to the low 90s Fahrenheit in July. The area is typically frost-free. Occasional cold fronts can drop nighttime lows into the 30s and 40s Fahrenheit during the winter months for a day or two at a time. Temperature extremes are modulated when compared to inland Collier County because the water surrounding the isles is warm for much of the year.

Hurricanes occasionally affect Isles of Capri. In 2017, Hurricane Irma caused extensive damage over much of coastal Collier County.
