= Stan Gober Memorial Bridge =

- Coordinates: 25.9329°N 81.6527°W
- Carries: CR 92 (San Marco Road)
- Crosses: Marco Channel
- Locale: Goodland, Florida
- Other name: Goodland Bridge
- ID number: 030184

History
- Opened: Original Bridge: 1938; Current Bridge; 1975

Location
- Interactive map of Stan Gober Memorial Bridge

The Stan Gober Memorial Bridge (previously known as the Goodland Bridge) is a bridge near Goodland, Florida connecting the east side of Marco Island with main land Collier County. The bridge is one of two bridges connecting Marco Island with the main land, with the other being the S.S. Jolley Bridge further west. The bridge is 55 feet tall and carries two lanes of County Road 92 (San Marco Road) over the Marco Channel.

== History ==
Originally known as the Goodland Bridge, the Stan Gober Memorial Bridge was built in 1975, replacing a wooden swing bridge. The original bridge was built in 1938 and it was the first vehicle bridge to connect Marco Island with the main land. The original bridge's iron swing span had been used previously on a bridge over the Caloosahatchee River near Fort Myers from 1924 to 1931. The original bridge's construction was funded by the Works Progress Administration (WPA), an agency created by President Franklin D. Roosevelt's New Deal. Before the bridge was built, a ferry service connected the Isles of Capri with Marco Island. Ruins of the original bridge remain today just to the south of the current bridge.

The current bridge was named after Stan Gober in 2012, who was the owner and operator of Stan's Idle Hour, a restaurant in Goodland.
