= Gulf Coast Town Center =

- Location: Fort Myers, Florida, United States
- Coordinates: 26°29′10″N 81°47′17″W
- Address: 9903 Gulf Coast Main Street
- Opened: November 4, 2005
- Developer: CBL & Associates Properties
- Manager: CBL Properties
- Owner: CBL Properties
- Num. of stores: 94
- Num. of anchor tenants: 11 (10 open, 1 vacant)
- Floor area: 1,238,721 square feet (120,000 m^{2})

Gulf Coast Town Center is an outdoor shopping mall in Fort Myers, Florida, United States. Opened in phases between 2005 and 2007, the center features Bass Pro Shops, Belk, Costco, Dick's Sporting Goods, LA Fitness, Marshalls, Regal Entertainment Group, and Target as its anchor stores. It is managed by CBL & Associates Properties.

== History ==
One of the first tenants confirmed for the mall site was a Belk department store, which was announced in 2003. The first phase included Staples, Petco, Jo-Ann Fabrics, Babies "R" Us, and a Regal Cinemas movie theater, followed by a Bass Pro Shops in the second phase in 2007. Other tenants included Costco, Linens 'n Things, Best Buy, Residence Inn by Marriott, JCPenney, and several restaurants. The final phase, completed in 2008, included Ron Jon Surf Shop, Dick's Sporting Goods, and Borders Books & Music.
