= S.S. Jolley Bridge =

Bridge in Florida, United States

- Coordinates: 25.96363°N 81.7097°W
- Carries: SR 951 (Collier Boulevard)
- Crosses: Marco Island-Naples waterway and Big Marco River west
- Locale: Collier County, Florida

History
- Opened: 1969 (original span); 2011 (parallel span)

Location
- Interactive map of S.S. Jolley Bridge

S.S. Jolley Bridge (also known as Judge S.S. Jolley Bridge) is a bridge located in Collier County, Florida connecting Marco Island with the mainland in Naples. The bridge is a good location for fishing.

== History ==
The Jolley Bridge opened in 1969 and was the second vehicular bridge connecting to Marco Island. The first was the original span of the Goodland Bridge built in 1938. When it opened, it included fishing piers below the bridge. The piers were heavily damaged after the landfall of Hurricane Wilma in 2005, and were subsequently removed.

In 2011, a second parallel span was built next to the original to provide two additional travel lanes. Today, southbound traffic uses the newer span, and northbound traffic uses the original span.

The Jolley Bridge is named for former Collier County Judge Seward Stokley Jolley, who served from 1935 until 1959.
