= Gordon River Greenway =

Greenways in Florida, United States

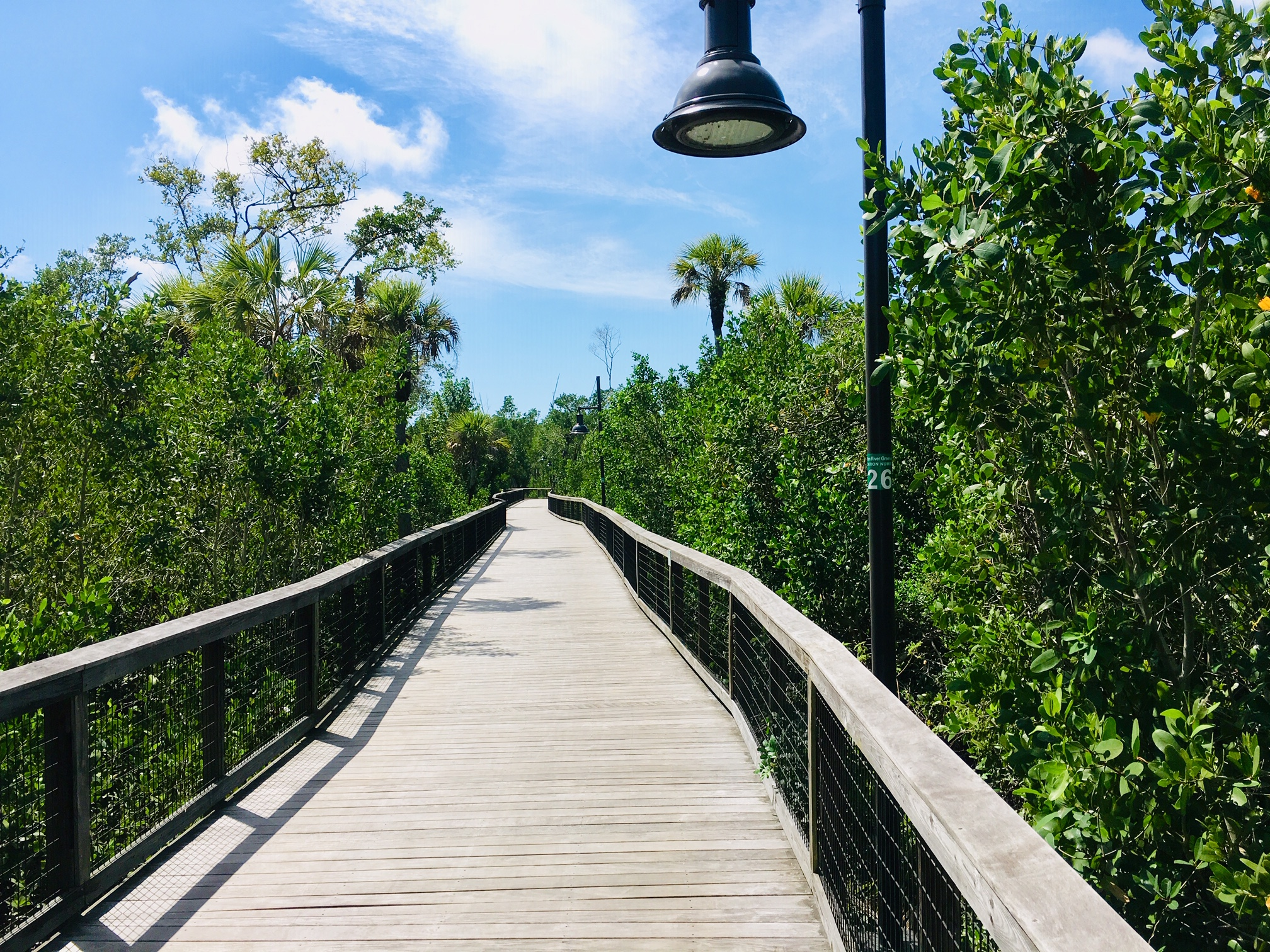
- Location: Naples, Florida, United States
- Use: Cycling, Walking, Hiking, Jogging
- Season: Year round
- Surface: Asphalt
- Website: Gordon River Greenway

The Gordon River Greenway is a nearly 2-mile system of trails and boardwalks running along the Gordon River in Naples, Florida, United States.

== Route ==
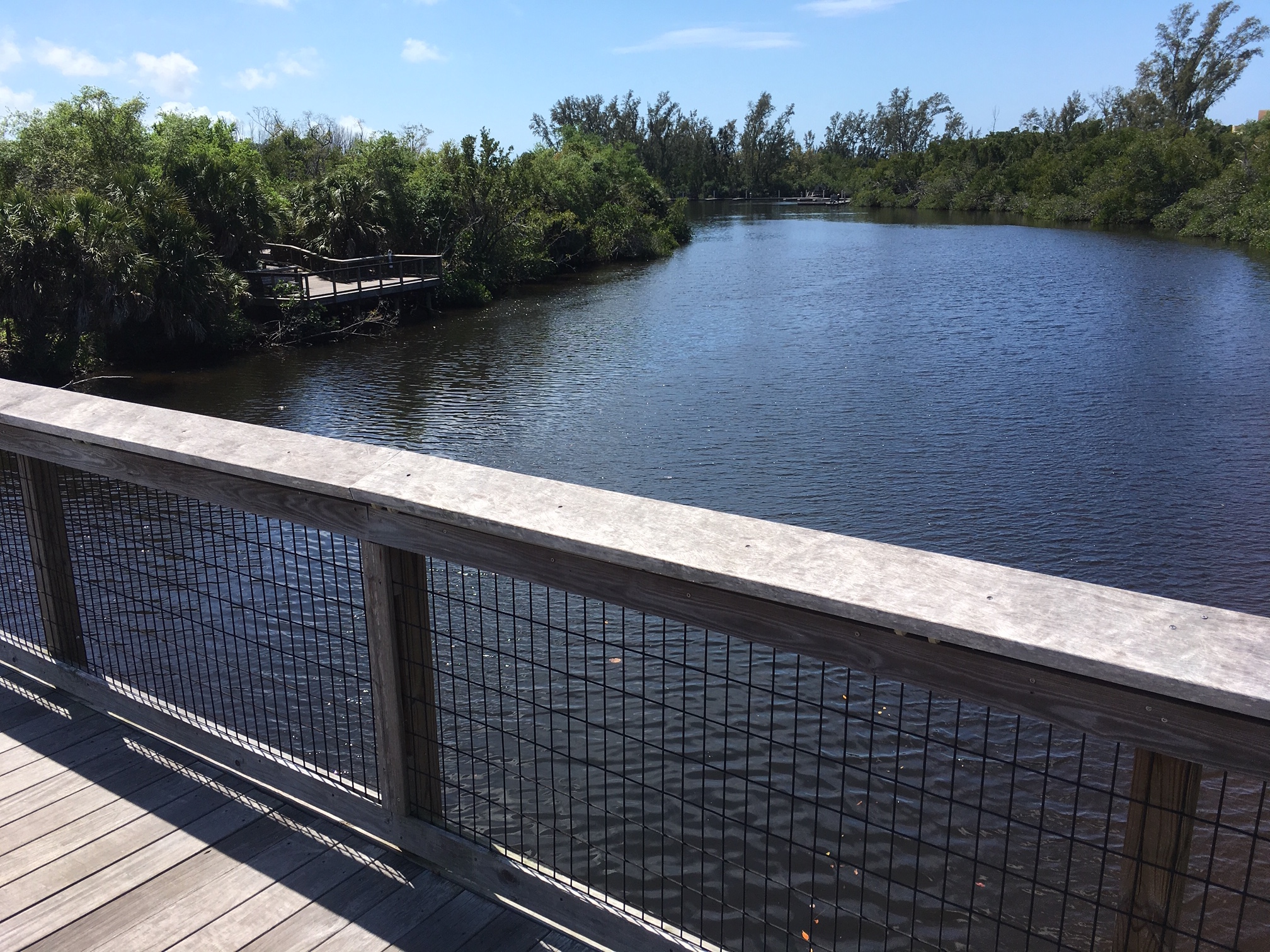
Gordon River as seen from bridge.

The northern terminus is at a trailhead along Golden Gate Parkway across from Freedom Park. From the trailhead, two parallel trails head south, which eventually merge. A short connection west connects the trail to the Naples Zoo. The main trail continues south and connects with an almost half-mile unpaved loop before crossing the Gordon River. South of Gordon River, it runs along the west side of Naples Airport before crossing the Gordon River again and terminating at Baker Park. It also connects with the bike path along North Road, which continues south and east along the south side of the airport.

== History ==
The northern part of the trail from the northern terminus to Naples Airport opened in 2014. Though, much of the land was purchased by Collier County in 2004. Baker Park and the southern section opened in 2019. The middle link along North Road (on the west side of the airport) opened in early 2020.

== Points of interest ==
- Freedom Park
- Naples Zoo
- Gordon River
- Naples Airport
- Baker Park
