= Corkscrew Swamp Sanctuary =

Audubon protected area near Naples, Florida

- IUCN category V (protected landscape/seascape)
- Location within Florida
- Location: 375 Sanctuary Rd W, Naples, FL 34120 Collier County, Florida, United States
- Nearest city: Naples, Florida
- Coordinates: 26°22′32″N 81°36′15″W
- Governing body: National Audubon Society

Ramsar Wetland
- Designated: 23 March 2009
- Reference no.: 1888

U.S. National Natural Landmark
- Designated: March 1964

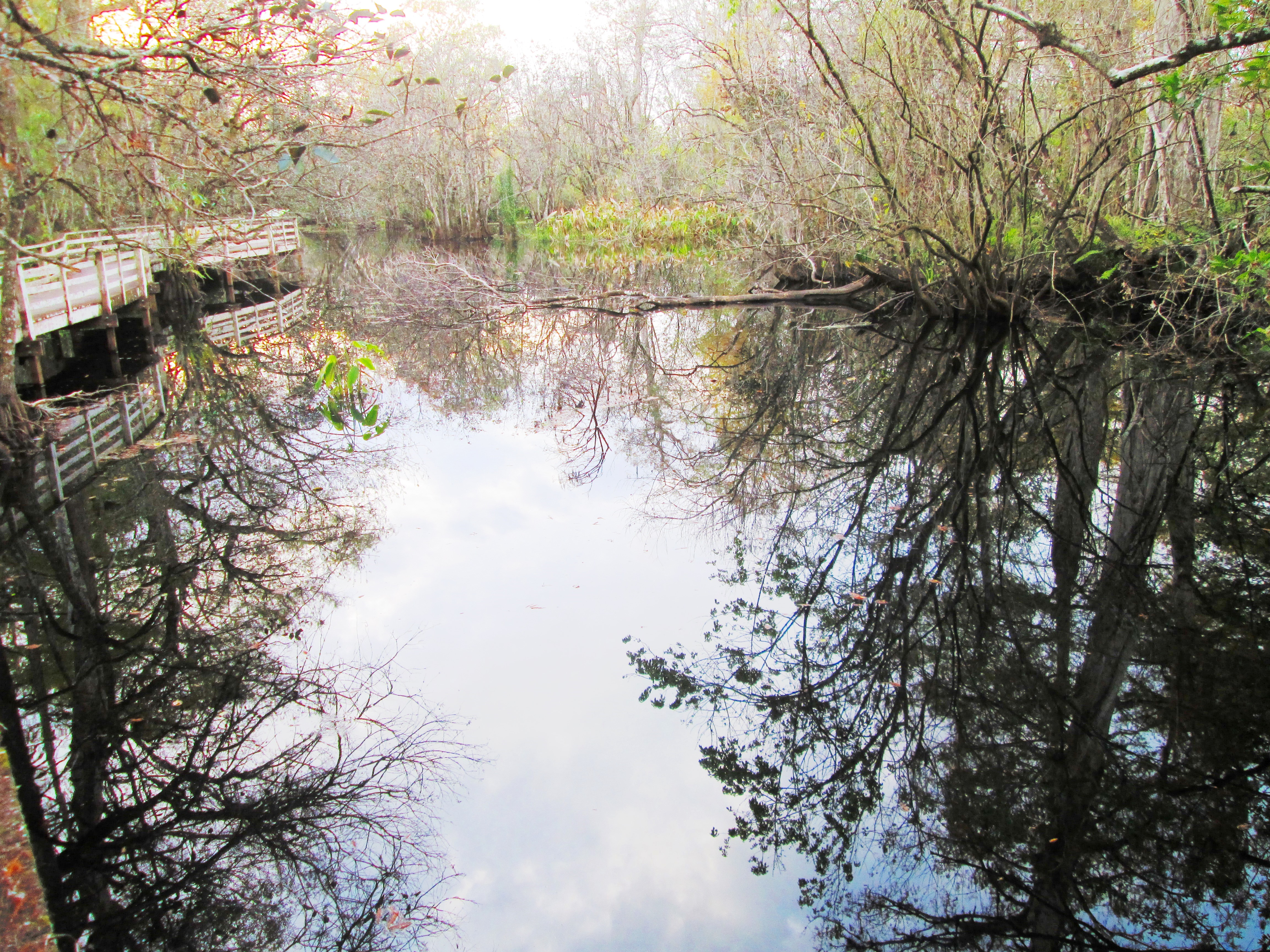
One of the Lettuce Lakes in the Corkscrew Swamp Sanctuary.

Corkscrew Swamp Sanctuary is a National Audubon Society sanctuary located in southwest Florida, north of Naples, Florida and east of Bonita Springs, in the United States. The sanctuary was established to protect one of the largest remaining stands of bald cypress (Taxodium distichum) and pond cypress (T. ascendens) in North America from extensive logging that was ongoing throughout the 1940s and 1950s. Part of the natural area is old-growth forest and recognized by the Old-Growth Forest Network.

== History ==
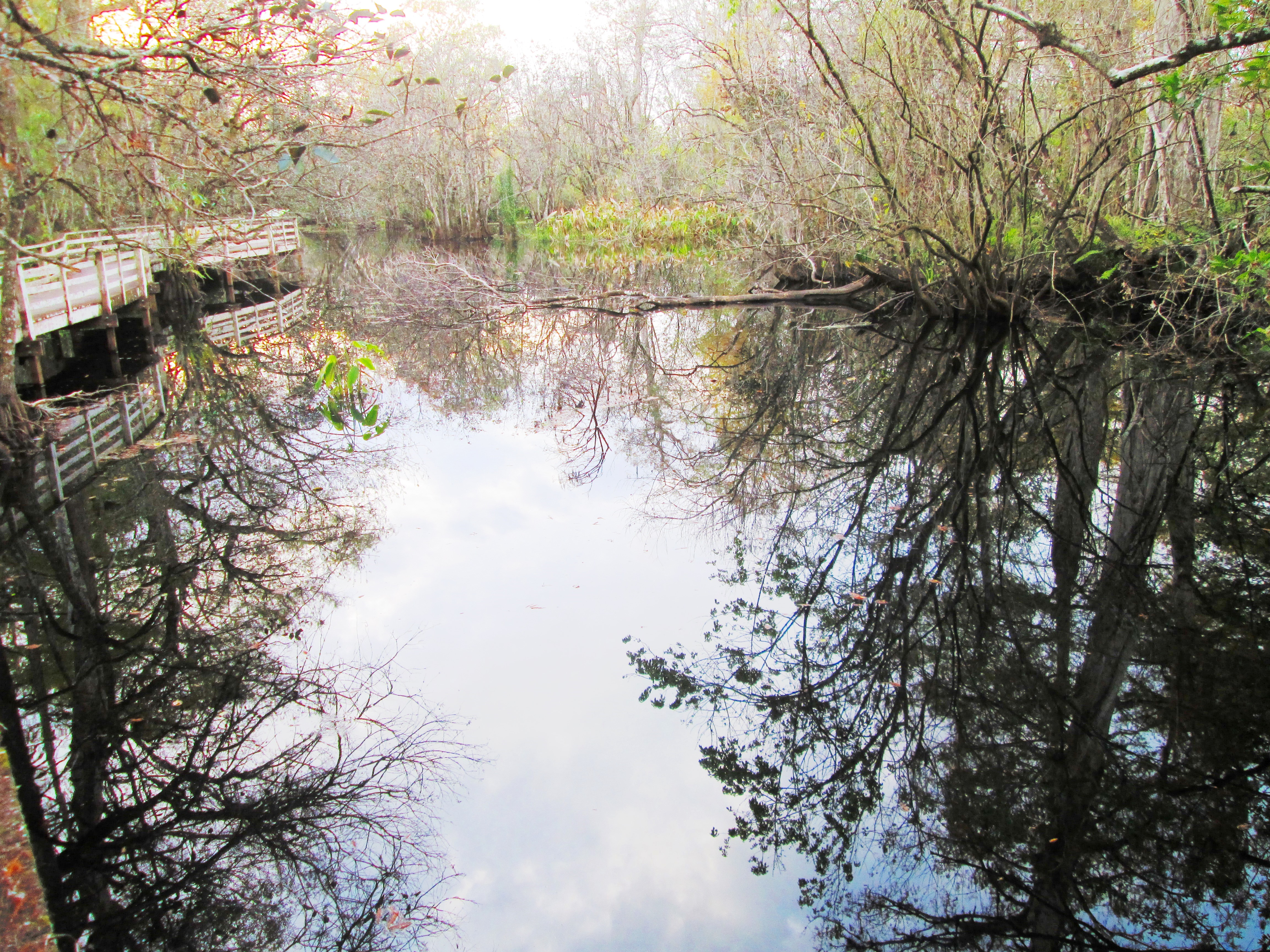
One of the park's Lettuce Lakes

The Corkscrew Cypress Rookery Association was formed in 1954 to protect the area. The National Audubon Society accepted responsibility for management and started constructing the first boardwalk through the swamp in 1955. In all, nearly 45 km^{2} (17 sq mi) of wetland was purchased or donated, most of it from or by the owners, Lee Tidewater Cypress Center Co. and Collier Enterprises. Some of the funding that went to preserving the wetland was donated by Theodore Miller Edison, youngest son of the inventor Thomas Edison.

In 2018, researchers at the Sanctuary determined that beginning around the year 2000, the amount of groundwater in the park began to diminish. Records have been kept of water levels beginning in 1957, and analysis determined that previous changes in the landscape – such as the building of Immokalee Road, the use of canals to drain land for real estate development, the increase in agriculture in the area, the installation of electrical and telephone lines, or the paving over of neighboring wetlands – had not altered the water levels, which are measured at Lettuce Lake, the park's deepest standing water. But since 2000 or 2001, despite the same amount of annual rainfall during the wet season, during the dry season the water now drains away quickly instead of slowly receding as it had done in the past. The cause of the change is unknown – there was no major topographical change at the time – but the cause and the effects of the drier dry season for the Sanctuary and surrounding Collier County are under investigation.

== Park offerings and amenities ==
A boardwalk of 2.25 miles in length provides walking access through pine flatwoods, wet prairie, stands of pond cypress and bald cypress, and marsh ecosystems within the sanctuary. In 2017, some parts of the boardwalk were damaged by bald cypress trees knocked over by Hurricane Irma. Most of the damage was repaired, but several small sections have been permanently closed.

The sanctuary is named a Ramsar Convention Wetland of International Importance, a Wetland of Distinction by the Society of Wetland Scientists, and a gateway site for the Great Florida Birding Trail. It was an important breeding area for the endangered wood stork and other wetland birds. It also has wintering passerines, including the painted bunting. Numerous wading bird species can be found in the wetlands of the sanctuary, including the yellow-crowned night heron, black-crowned night heron, tricolored heron, great egret, and snowy egret. Specialist birds include limpkin, barred owl and, in summer, swallow-tailed kite.

American alligators and cottonmouth snakes are also inhabitants of the sanctuary.

The sanctuary visitor center includes a Living Machine demonstration site and an interactive experience called the Spurlino Foundation Discovery Center, which opened in 2026.

== Gallery ==
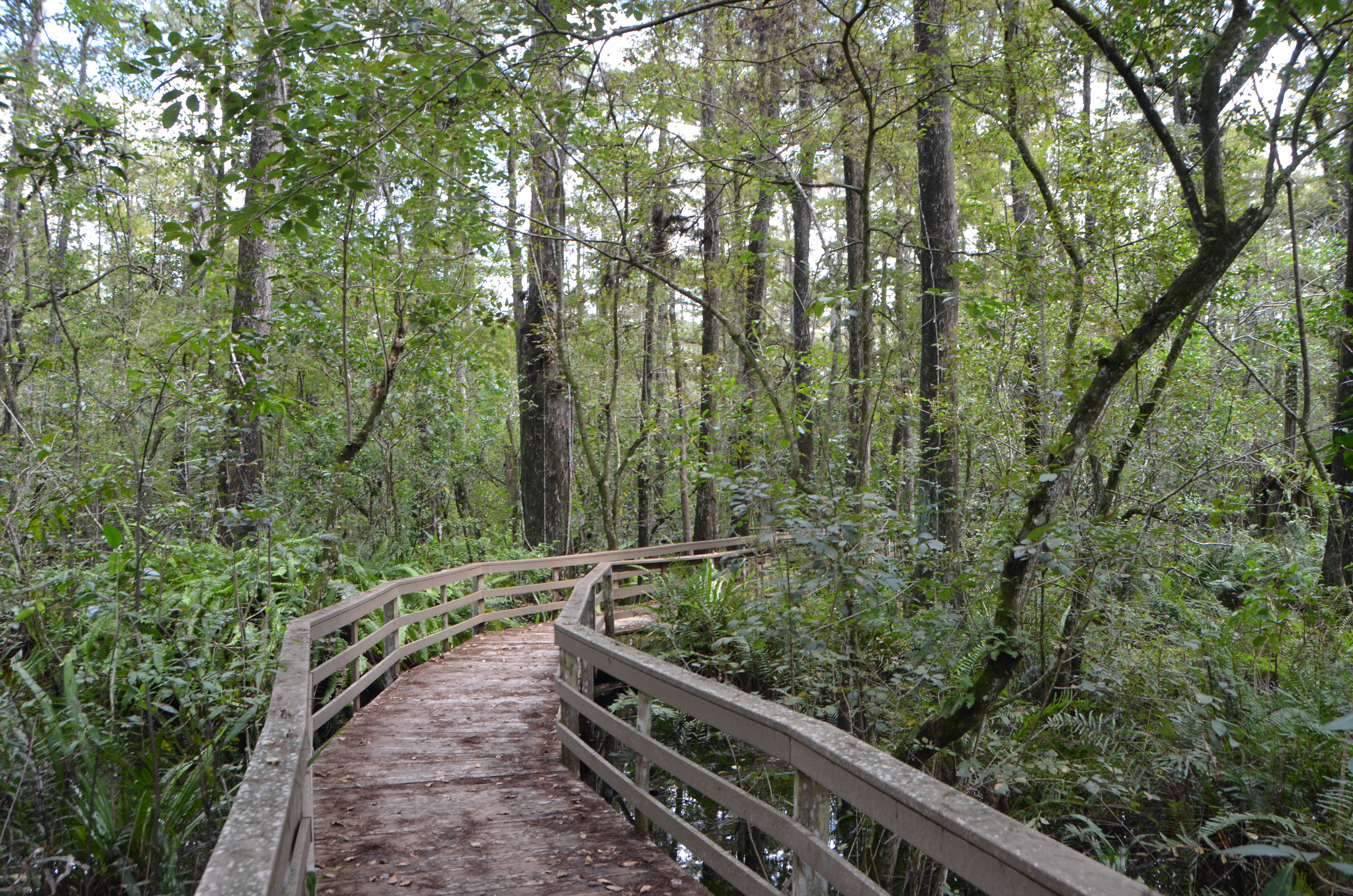
One of the many boardwalks in the sanctuary

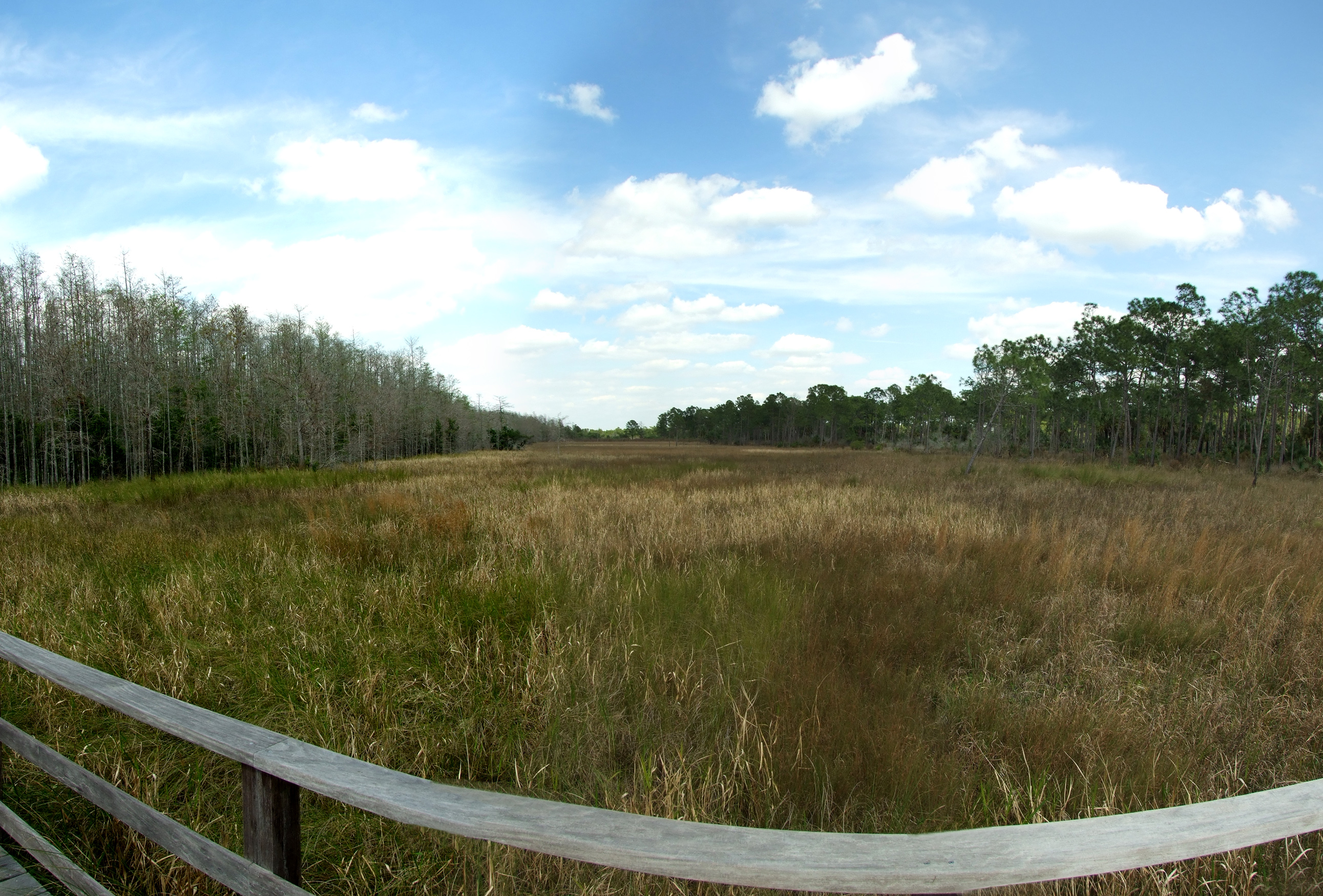
A sawgrass prairie

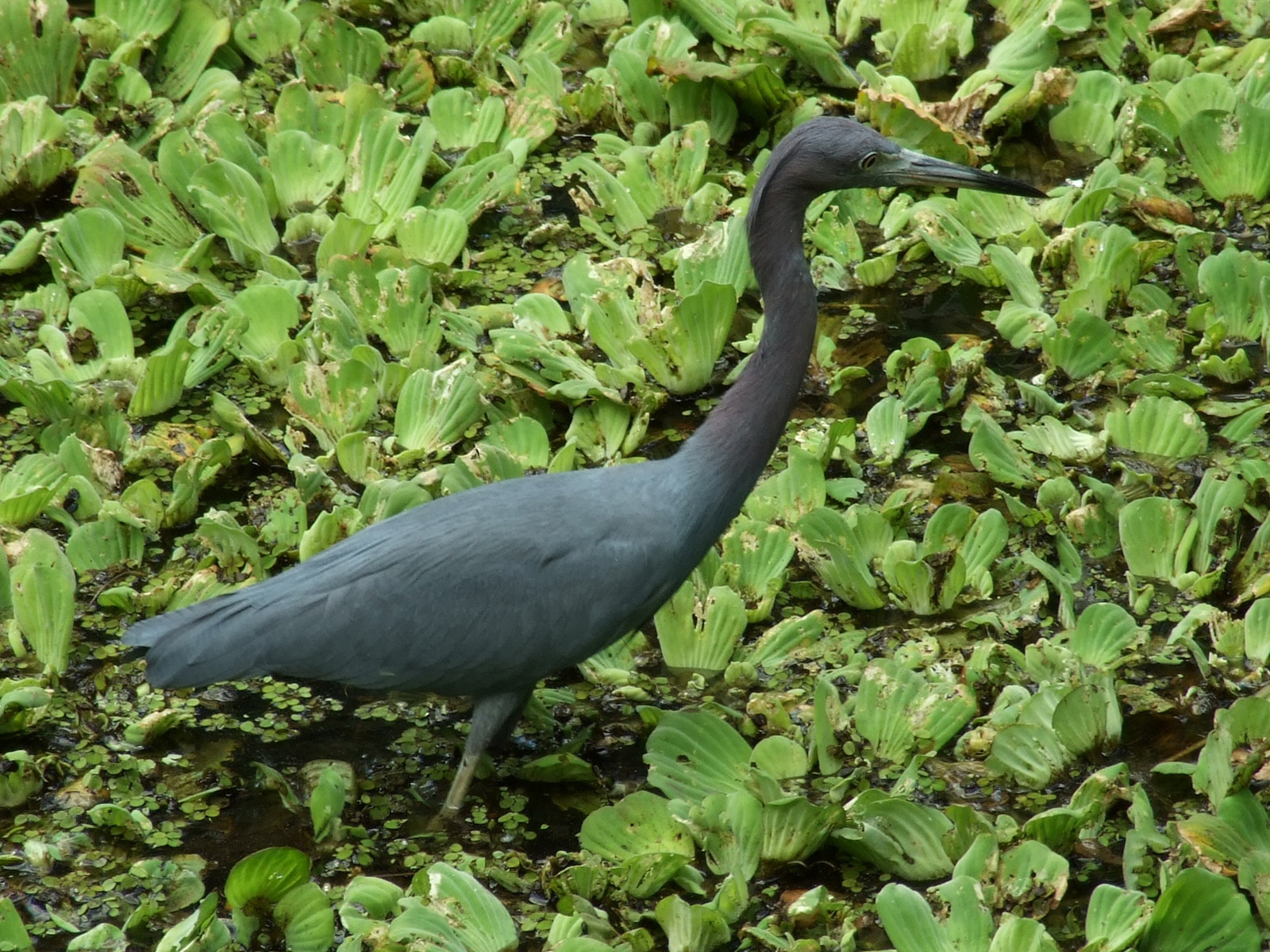
Male little blue heron

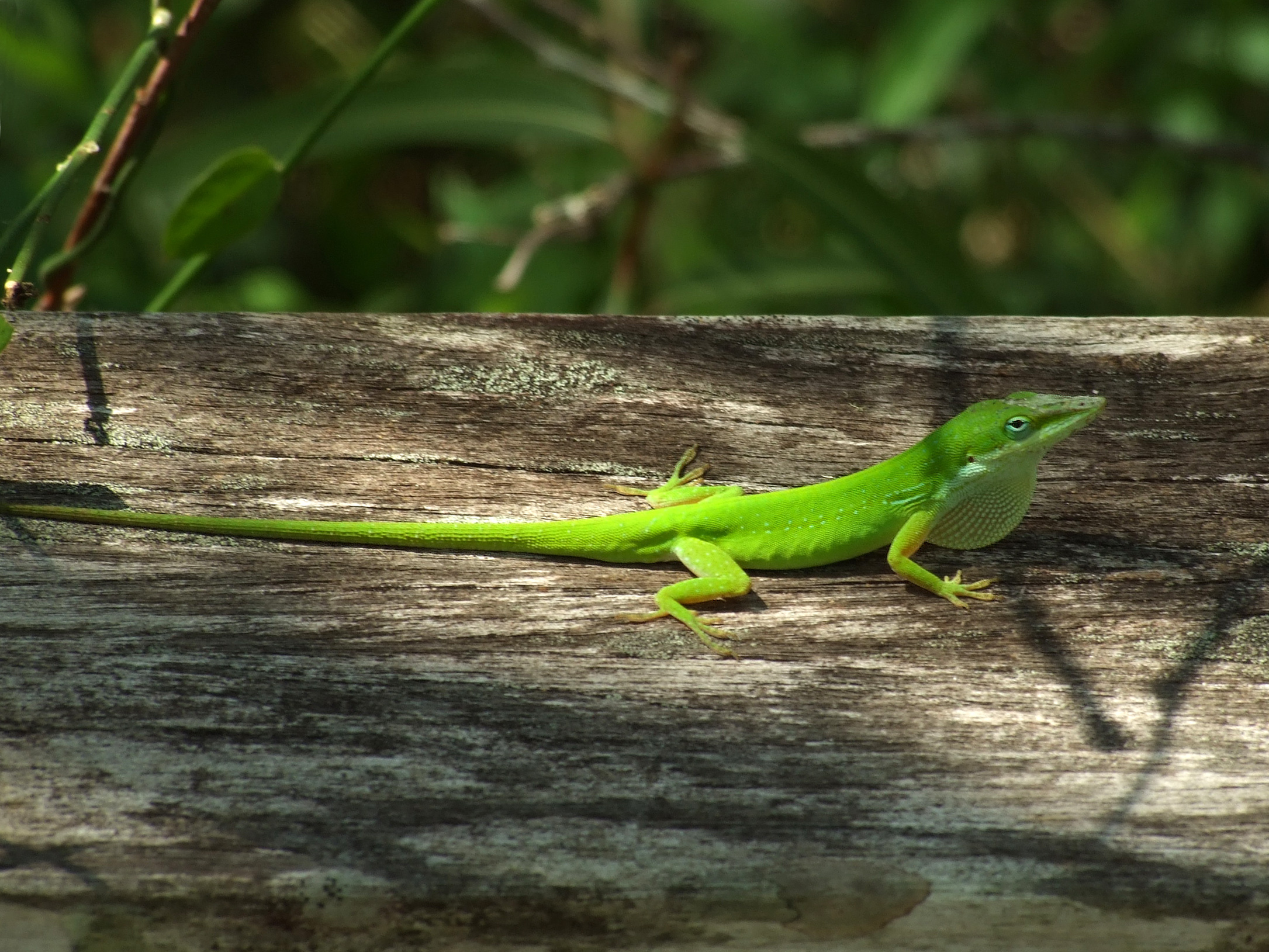
Male Anolis carolinensis

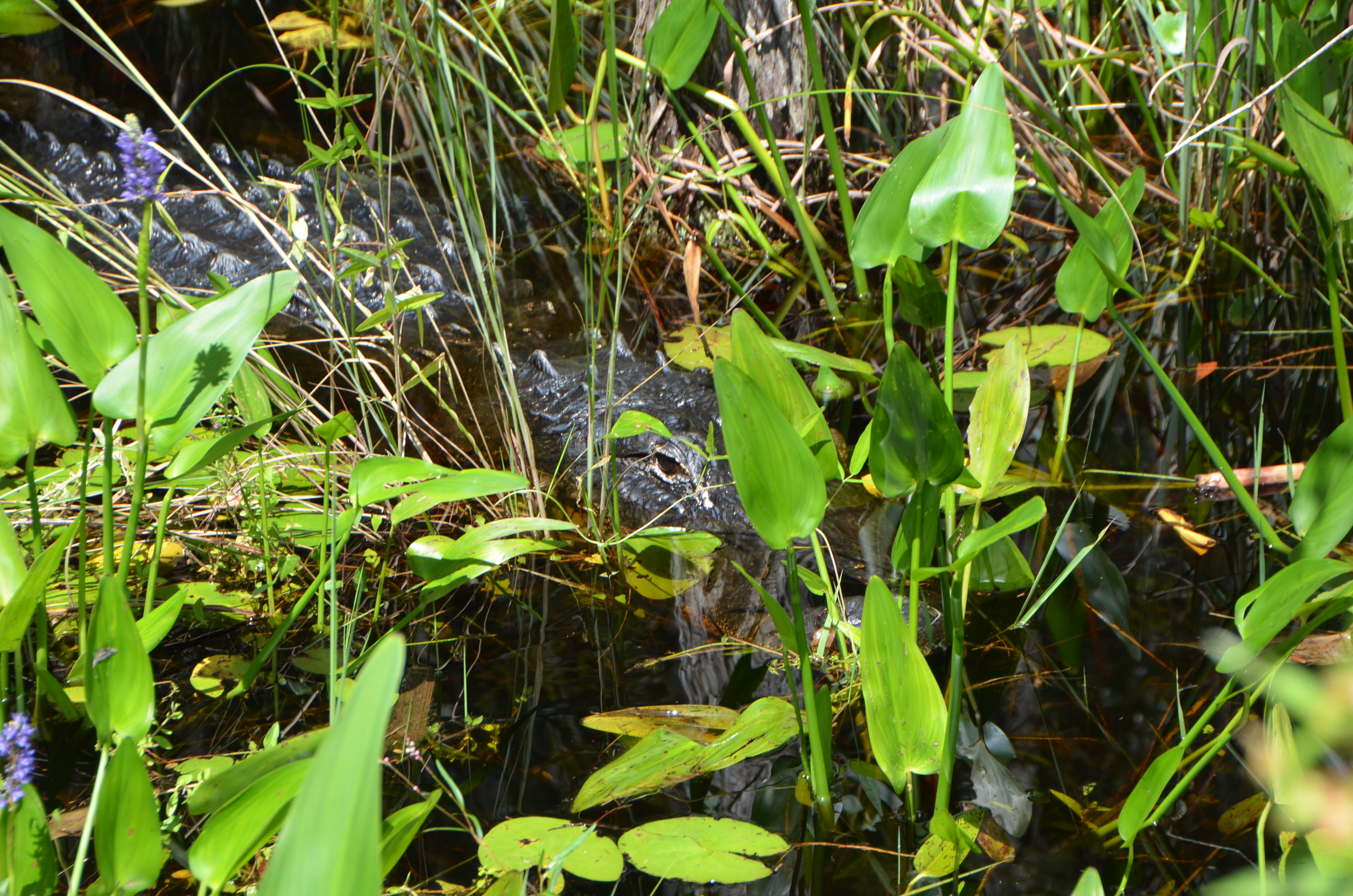
Adult American alligator

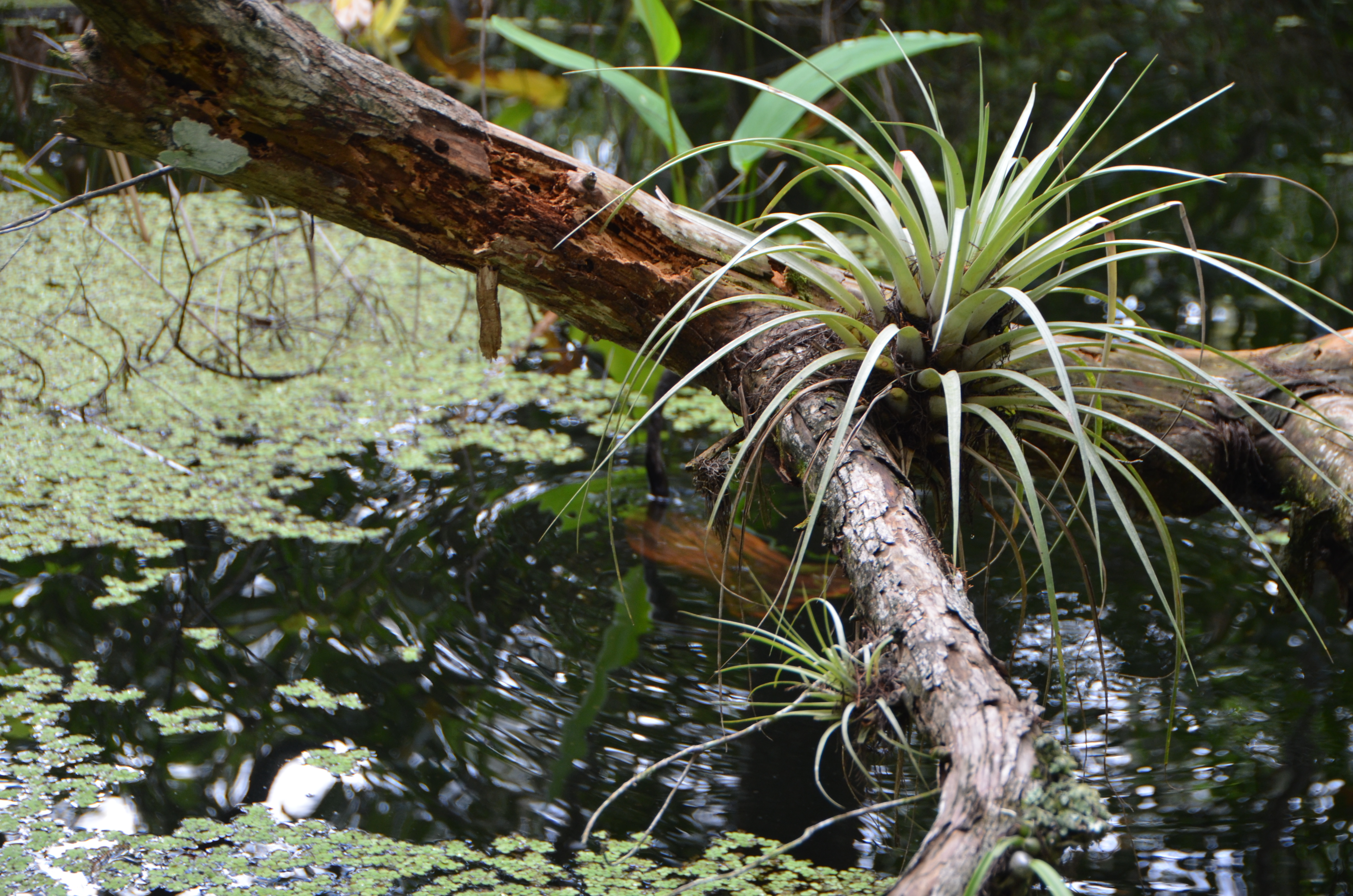
Tillandsia species

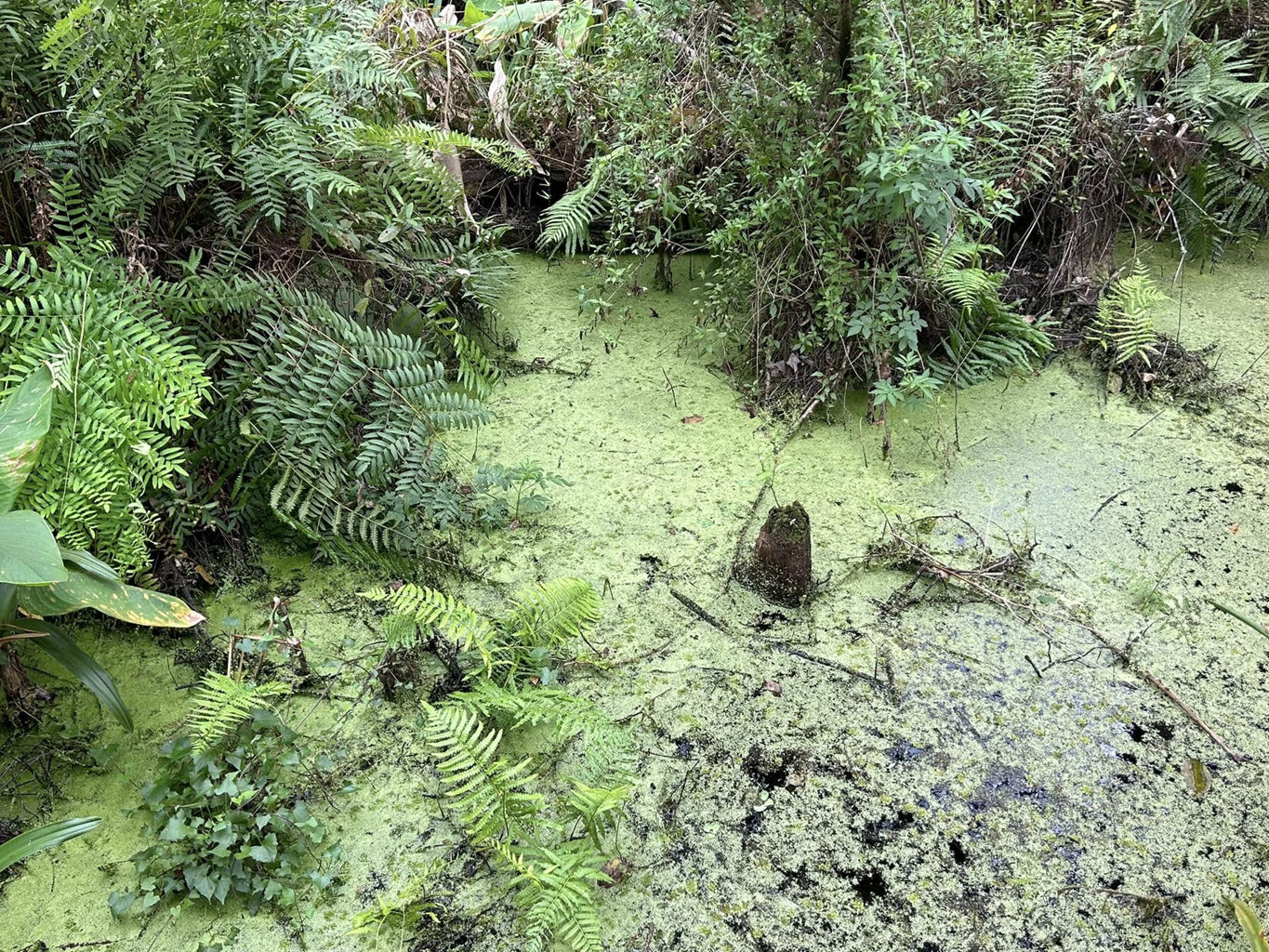
Swamp
