= Delnor-Wiggins Pass State Park =

State park in Florida, United States

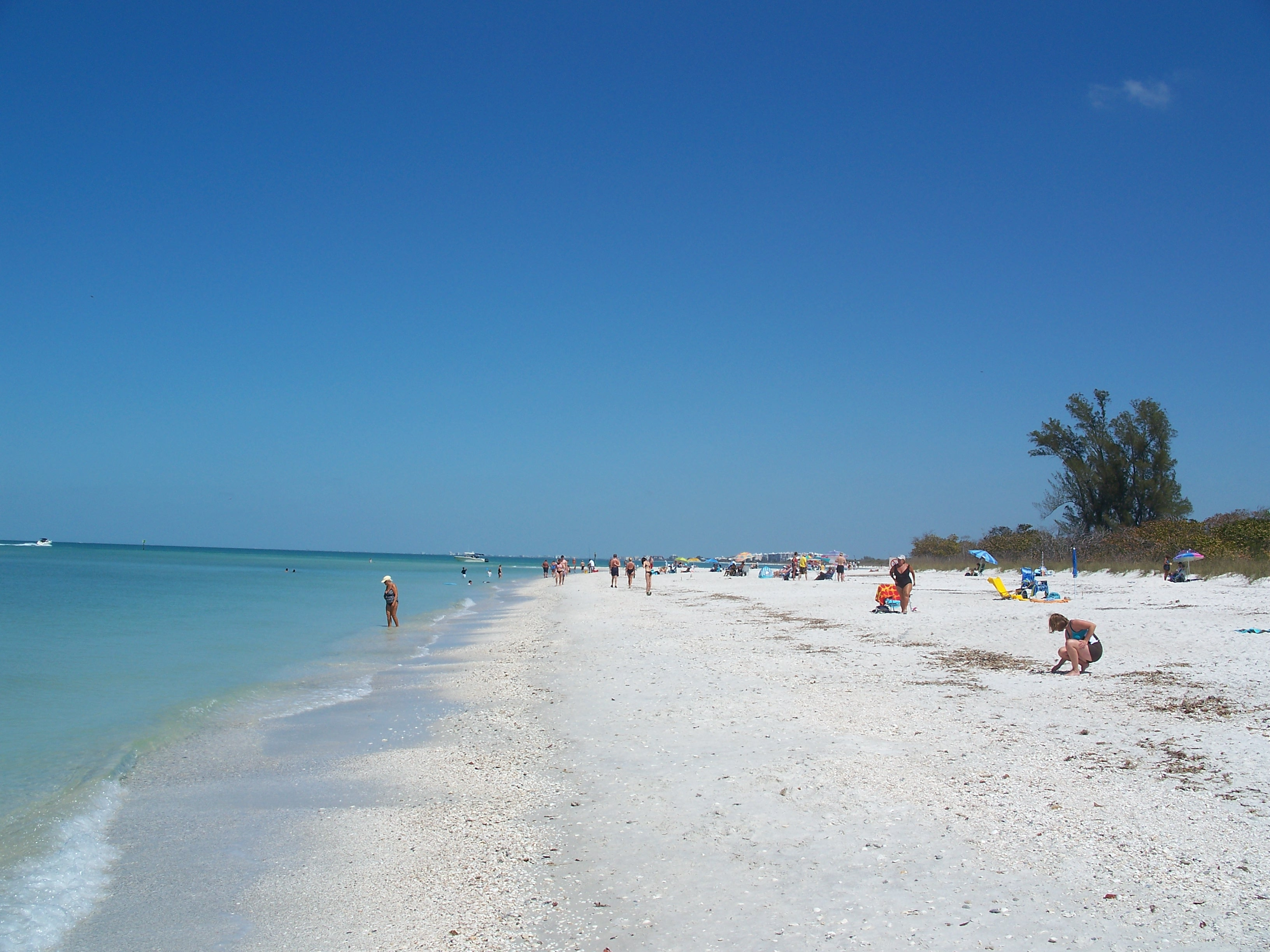
- The beach on a sunny day

- Location within Florida Location within the United States
- Interactive map of Delnor-Wiggins Pass State Park
- Location: Collier County, Florida, USA
- Nearest city: Naples, Florida
- Coordinates: 26°16′52″N 81°49′41″W
- Established: 1976
- Governing body: Florida Department of Environmental Protection, Florida State Park

Delnor-Wiggins Pass State Park is a Florida state park located on a barrier island on Florida's southwest coast near Naples, Florida, 6 miles west of I-75 in North Naples. The Cocohatchee River and the Gulf of Mexico are accessible from the park, which contains a hard-bottom reef.

== History ==
The early record of this area begins in the late 1800s with Joe Wiggins, for whom the park is named. He ran a trading post where he traded goods with settlers. Decades later, in 1964, Collier County acquired the land through the help of Lester J. and Dellora A. Norris. This is where the name Delnor comes from; the first three letters of Dellora and the first three letters of Norris. In 1970, the state of Florida purchased the land from Collier County for a state park, which opened in 1976.

== Geography ==
Submerged land and mangrove swamp account for about 80% of the park. Wiggins Pass and the Cocohatchee River estuary lie to the north, while Vanderbilt Channel and Water Turkey Bay lie to the east.

== Fauna ==
Among the wildlife of the park are bald eagles, ospreys, owls, loggerhead sea turtles, West Indian manatees, and migratory shorebirds. The endangered gopher tortoise can also be found there. It is the only tortoise found east of the Mississippi River.

== Recreational activities ==
Activities include fishing, sunbathing, swimming, paddleboarding, boating, geocaching, hiking, and nature viewing. Visitors can also scuba dive, snorkel, kayak, and picnic. A fishing license is required to fish at the park in some areas. Weddings can also be held there.

== Amenities ==
Due to hurricane destruction, amenities including boardwalks, observation decks, picnic areas, pavilions, as well as concessions are no longer available for use. However, parking, boat ramp and the beach itself are still available for use.

Pets are ONLY allowed throughout the PAVED areas of the park, but they are NOT permitted on the beach. To protect wildlife on the beach, pets are to be kept on a 6-foot, hand-held leash at all times.

Delnor-Wiggins Pass State Park is committed to providing a variety of amenities accessible to its visitors at no charge, but they are available as first-come, first-serve basis. The park offers: portable restrooms, parking, beach wheelchairs (located in parking lot 1 and 3), as well as an electric beach wheelchair which can be requested at the Mobile Ranger Station or call the office at 239-409-0637 to check availability.

== Notable Changes ==
The pass gets dredged out nearly every other year from sediment buildup.

== Hours and fees ==
Delnor-Wiggins Pass State Park is open from 8 am to sundown every day of the year (including holidays). Admission is $6 per vehicle, and $5 to use the boat ramp, in addition to the admission fee.
