= Orangetree, Florida =

- Census-designated place
- Location in Collier County and the state of Florida
- Coordinates: 26°17′34″N 81°34′43″W
- Country: United States
- State: Florida
- County: Collier

Area
  - Total: 4.41 sq mi (11.43 km^{2})
  - Land: 3.64 sq mi (9.42 km^{2})
  - Water: 0.78 sq mi (2.01 km^{2})
- Elevation: 20 ft (6.1 m)

Population (2020)
  - Total: 5,896
  - Density: 1,621.0/sq mi (625.87/km^{2})
- Time zone: UTC-5 (Eastern (EST))
  - Summer (DST): UTC-4 (EDT)
- ZIP code: 34120
- Area code: 239
- FIPS code: 12-52162
- GNIS feature ID: 2403379

Orangetree is a census-designated place (CDP) in Collier County, Florida, United States. The population was 5,896 at the 2020 census, up from 4,406 at the 2010 census. It is part of the Naples–Marco Island Metropolitan Statistical Area.

== Geography ==
Orangetree is located in northeastern Collier County 23 miles (37 km) northeast of downtown Naples.

According to the United States Census Bureau, the CDP has a total area of 4.4 square miles (11.4 km^{2}), of which 3.8 square miles (9.9 km^{2}) is land and 0.62 square miles (1.6 km^{2}), or 13.60%, is water.

== Demographics ==
Historical population
Census	Pop.	Note	%±
2000	950		—
2010	4,406		363.8%
2020	5,896		33.8%
U.S. Decennial Census

=== 2020 census ===
As of the 2020 census, Orangetree had a population of 5,896. The median age was 41.7 years. 24.5% of residents were under the age of 18 and 16.4% of residents were 65 years of age or older. For every 100 females there were 97.0 males, and for every 100 females age 18 and over there were 92.1 males age 18 and over.

100.0% of residents lived in urban areas, while 0.0% lived in rural areas.

There were 1,978 households in Orangetree, of which 38.6% had children under the age of 18 living in them. Of all households, 72.0% were married-couple households, 7.7% were households with a male householder and no spouse or partner present, and 14.3% were households with a female householder and no spouse or partner present. About 11.7% of all households were made up of individuals and 5.8% had someone living alone who was 65 years of age or older.

There were 2,202 housing units, of which 10.2% were vacant. The homeowner vacancy rate was 2.1% and the rental vacancy rate was 7.3%.

Orangetree racial composition (Hispanics excluded from racial categories) (NH = Non-Hispanic)
Race	Number	Percentage
White (NH)	3,610	61.23%
Black or African American (NH)	418	7.09%
Native American or Alaska Native (NH)	7	0.12%
Asian (NH)	142	2.41%
Some Other Race (NH)	36	0.61%
Mixed/Multi-Racial (NH)	189	3.21%
Hispanic or Latino	1,494	25.34%
Total	5,896	

=== 2000 census ===
As of the census of 2000, there were 950 people, 327 households, and 292 families residing in the CDP. The population density was 214.8 inhabitants per square mile (82.9/km^{2}). There were 355 housing units at an average density of 80.3 per square mile (31.0/km^{2}). The racial makeup of the CDP was 95.05% White, 1.26% African American, 0.11% Native American, 0.21% Asian, 0.11% Pacific Islander, 1.89% from other races, and 1.37% from two or more races. Hispanic or Latino of any race were 13.58% of the population.

There were 327 households, out of which 45.0% had children under the age of 18 living with them, 80.1% were married couples living together, 6.4% had a female householder with no husband present, and 10.7% were non-families. 10.1% of all households were made up of individuals, and 2.4% had someone living alone who was 65 years of age or older. The average household size was 2.91 and the average family size was 3.07.

In the CDP, the population was spread out, with 30.3% under the age of 18, 3.6% from 18 to 24, 32.6% from 25 to 44, 23.4% from 45 to 64, and 10.1% who were 65 years of age or older. The median age was 35 years. For every 100 females, there were 100.8 males. For every 100 females age 18 and over, there were 95.3 males.

The median income for a household in the CDP was $56,645, and the median income for a family was $57,614. Males had a median income of $39,297 versus $26,071 for females. The per capita income for the CDP was $20,616. None of the families and 1.7% of the population were living below the poverty line, including no under eighteens and none of those over 64.

== Education ==
Orangetree's public schools are operated by the District School Board of Collier County. Residents are zoned to Corkscrew Elementary School and Middle School, and Palmetto Ridge High School, all in Orangetree.

== Weather ==
In 2016, the Bulletin of the American Meteorological Society announced that Orangetree experiences more lightning than any other location in the United States, with around 200 flashes of lightning per square mile each year.
