= Three Oaks, Florida =

- Census-designated place
- Location in Lee County and the state of Florida
- Coordinates: 26°28′21″N 81°47′45″W
- Country: United States
- State: Florida
- County: Lee

Area
  - Total: 1.78 sq mi (4.61 km^{2})
  - Land: 1.73 sq mi (4.49 km^{2})
  - Water: 0.046 sq mi (0.12 km^{2})
- Elevation: 20 ft (6.1 m)

Population (2020)
  - Total: 5,472
  - Density: 3,155.5/sq mi (1,218.33/km^{2})
- Time zone: UTC-5 (Eastern (EST))
  - Summer (DST): UTC-4 (EDT)
- FIPS code: 12-71758
- GNIS feature ID: 2402929

Three Oaks is a census-designated place (CDP) in Lee County, Florida, United States. The population was 5,472 at the 2020 census, up from 3,592 at the 2010 census. It is part of the Cape Coral-Fort Myers, Florida Metropolitan Statistical Area.

== Geography ==
Three Oaks is located in south-central Lee County. It is bordered to the south by the village of Estero and to the west by the San Carlos Park census-designated place. Interstate 75 forms the eastern border of the Three Oaks CDP, with access from Exit 128 (Alico Road) at the northeast corner of the CDP. I-75 leads north 10 miles (16 km) to the eastern side of Fort Myers and south 22 miles (35 km) to the Naples area.

According to the United States Census Bureau, the Three Oaks CDP has a total area of 1.7 square miles (4.3 km^{2}), of which 1.6 square miles (4.2 km^{2}) are land and 0.05 square miles (0.12 km^{2}), or 2.77%, are water.

== Demographics ==
Historical population
Census	Pop.	Note	%±
2000	2,255		—
2010	3,592		59.3%
2020	5,472		52.3%
U.S. Decennial Census

=== 2020 census ===
As of the 2020 census, Three Oaks had a population of 5,472. The median age was 32.6 years. 22.1% of residents were under the age of 18 and 11.0% of residents were 65 years of age or older. For every 100 females there were 99.3 males, and for every 100 females age 18 and over there were 97.3 males age 18 and over.

100.0% of residents lived in urban areas, while 0.0% lived in rural areas.

There were 2,097 households in Three Oaks, of which 32.6% had children under the age of 18 living in them. Of all households, 48.4% were married-couple households, 19.6% were households with a male householder and no spouse or partner present, and 23.7% were households with a female householder and no spouse or partner present. About 19.7% of all households were made up of individuals and 5.0% had someone living alone who was 65 years of age or older.

There were 2,291 housing units, of which 8.5% were vacant. The homeowner vacancy rate was 1.4% and the rental vacancy rate was 10.8%.

Racial composition as of the 2020 census
Race	Number	Percent
White	4,342	79.3%
Black or African American	129	2.4%
American Indian and Alaska Native	6	0.1%
Asian	219	4.0%
Native Hawaiian and Other Pacific Islander	1	0.0%
Some other race	241	4.4%
Two or more races	534	9.8%
Hispanic or Latino (of any race)	850	15.5%

=== 2000 census ===
As of the census of 2000, there were 2,255 people, 749 households, and 650 families residing in the CDP. The population density was 1,739.5 inhabitants per square mile (671.6/km^{2}). There were 789 housing units at an average density of 608.6 per square mile (235.0/km^{2}). The racial makeup of the CDP was 96.10% White, 0.27% African American, 0.18% Native American, 1.37% Asian, 1.37% from other races, and 0.71% from two or more races. Hispanic or Latino of any race were 4.26% of the population.

There were 749 households, out of which 52.1% had children under the age of 18 living with them, 77.0% were married couples living together, 7.9% had a female householder with no husband present, and 13.2% were non-families. 10.4% of all households were made up of individuals, and 3.7% had someone living alone who was 65 years of age or older. The average household size was 3.01 and the average family size was 3.23.

In the CDP, the population was spread out, with 33.6% under the age of 18, 3.6% from 18 to 24, 32.1% from 25 to 44, 22.1% from 45 to 64, and 8.7% who were 65 years of age or older. The median age was 36 years. For every 100 females, there were 96.8 males. For every 100 females age 18 and over, there were 93.0 males.

The median income for a household in the CDP was $69,911, and the median income for a family was $74,286. Males had a median income of $50,250 versus $30,217 for females. The per capita income for the CDP was $23,997. About 1.0% of families and 1.6% of the population were below the poverty line, including 2.5% of those under age 18 and none of those age 65 or over.
