= Vanderbilt Beach, Florida =

- Unincorporated community
- Location within Florida
- Coordinates: 26°16′14″N 81°47′23″W
- Country: United States
- State: Florida
- County: Collier
- Elevation: 10 ft (3.0 m)
- Time zone: UTC-5 (Eastern (EST))
  - Summer (DST): UTC-4 (EDT)
- ZIP code: 34108
- Area code: 239
- GNIS feature ID: 294955

Vanderbilt Beach is an unincorporated community in Collier County, Florida, United States. It is located north of the Pelican Bay census-designated place and west of Naples Park, along the Gulf of Mexico. Vanderbilt Beach is 9 miles (14 km) north of the center of Naples. Vanderbilt Beach shares the ZIP code 34108 with Naples Park and North Naples.

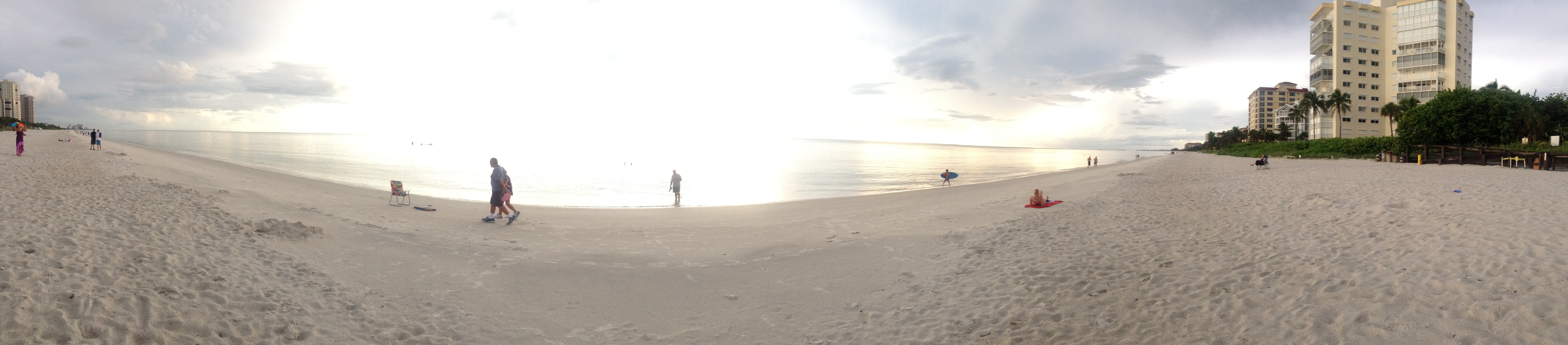
Vanderbilt Beach north of Naples, Florida
