= Golden Gate, Florida =

- Census-designated place
- Location in Collier County and the state of Florida
- Coordinates: 26°11′04″N 81°42′11″W
- Country: United States
- State: Florida
- County: Collier

Area
  - Total: 4.11 sq mi (10.65 km^{2})
  - Land: 3.90 sq mi (10.11 km^{2})
  - Water: 0.20 sq mi (0.53 km^{2})
- Elevation: 13 ft (4.0 m)

Population (2020)
  - Total: 25,321
  - Density: 6,484.9/sq mi (2,503.82/km^{2})
- Time zone: UTC-5 (Eastern (EST))
  - Summer (DST): UTC-4 (EDT)
- ZIP code: 34116
- Area code: 239
- FIPS code: 12-26300
- GNIS feature ID: 2402531

Golden Gate is a community and census-designated place (CDP) in Collier County, Florida, United States. Golden Gate's boundaries coincide with a 2 by 2 miles (3.2 by 3.2 km) square of significantly higher density development than surrounding areas. The population was 25,321 as recorded in the 2020 census, up from 23,961 at the 2010 census. It is part of the Naples–Marco Island Metropolitan Statistical Area.

== Geography ==
Golden Gate is located in western Collier County 8 miles (13 km) northeast of Naples.

According to the United States Census Bureau, the CDP has a total area of 4.1 square miles (10.6 km^{2}), of which 3.9 square miles (10.1 km^{2}) is land and 0.19 square miles (0.5 km^{2}), or 5.08%, is water.

== Demographics ==
Historical population
Census	Pop.	Note	%±
1990	14,148		—
2000	20,951		48.1%
2010	23,961		14.4%
2020	25,321		5.7%
U.S. Decennial Census

=== 2020 census ===
As of the 2020 census, Golden Gate had a population of 25,321. The median age was 35.7 years. 25.5% of residents were under the age of 18 and 10.5% of residents were 65 years of age or older. For every 100 females there were 104.1 males, and for every 100 females age 18 and over there were 103.4 males age 18 and over.

100.0% of residents lived in urban areas, while 0.0% lived in rural areas.

There were 7,821 households in Golden Gate, of which 43.8% had children under the age of 18 living in them. Of all households, 46.7% were married-couple households, 19.8% were households with a male householder and no spouse or partner present, and 24.7% were households with a female householder and no spouse or partner present. About 16.3% of all households were made up of individuals and 6.0% had someone living alone who was 65 years of age or older.

There were 8,382 housing units, of which 6.7% were vacant. The homeowner vacancy rate was 0.7% and the rental vacancy rate was 5.2%.

Racial composition as of the 2020 census
Race	Number	Percent
White	7,551	29.8%
Black or African American	3,788	15.0%
American Indian and Alaska Native	298	1.2%
Asian	144	0.6%
Native Hawaiian and Other Pacific Islander	5	0.0%
Some other race	5,464	21.6%
Two or more races	8,071	31.9%
Hispanic or Latino (of any race)	16,549	65.4%

Golden Gate racial composition (Hispanics excluded from racial categories) (NH = Non-Hispanic)
Race	Number	Percentage
White (NH)	4,513	17.82%
Black or African American (NH)	3,650	14.41%
Native American or Alaska Native (NH)	17	0.07%
Asian (NH)	136	0.54%
Pacific Islander (NH)	2	0.01%
Some Other Race (NH)	104	0.41%
Mixed/Multi-Racial (NH)	350	1.38%
Hispanic or Latino	16,549	65.36%
Total	25,321	

=== 2000 census ===
As of the census of 2000, there were 20,951 people, 6,518 households, and 5,012 families residing in the CDP. The population density was 5,190.7 inhabitants per square mile (2,004.1/km^{2}). There were 7,010 housing units at an average density of 1,736.8 per square mile (670.6/km^{2}). The racial makeup of the CDP was 77.00% White, 10.15% African American, 0.38% Native American, 0.71% Asian, 0.12% Pacific Islander, 7.34% from other races, and 4.31% from two or more races. Hispanic or Latino of any race were 37.14% of the population.

There were 6,518 households, out of which 44.6% had children under the age of 18 living with them, 54.6% were married couples living together, 13.7% had a female householder with no husband present, and 23.1% were non-families. 14.6% of all households were made up of individuals, and 3.7% had someone living alone who was 65 years of age or older. The average household size was 3.21 and the average family size was 3.44.

In the CDP, the population was spread out, with 30.1% under the age of 18, 11.6% from 18 to 24, 36.0% from 25 to 44, 16.1% from 45 to 64, and 6.2% who were 65 years of age or older. The median age was 30 years. For every 100 females, there were 111.7 males. For every 100 females age 18 and over, there were 114.0 males.

The median income for a household in the CDP was $42,295, and the median income for a family was $41,774. Males had a median income of $28,630 versus $22,911 for females. The per capita income for the CDP was $15,923. About 11.4% of families and 14.1% of the population were below the poverty line, including 18.0% of those under age 18 and 9.9% of those age 65 or over.

== Public transportation ==
Golden Gate is served by Collier Area Transit's 3A, 3B, 4, and 10 routes.
