= County roads in Florida =

County Roads in Florida
- County road shields used in Florida

System information
- Notes: State Roads are generally state-maintained.

Highway names
- Interstates: Interstate X
- US Highways: U.S. Highway X
- State: State Road X
- County: County Road X

System links
- County roads in Florida

County Roads in Florida are controlled and maintained by the respective counties in which they reside. These county roads are found in every county of Florida.

== History ==
The county road system was created in 1977 as a result of the Florida Department of Transportation changing the division of roads from secondary state roads, which were at one time primary state roads, to county roads. Most secondary roads and some primary roads were given to the counties, and occasionally a new state road was taken over; some main roads in incorporated areas were given to the localities. As a result of how the county road system was created, county roads generally follow the same numbering grid pattern as the state roads.

== Signage ==
The secondary signs had the S changed to C (for county) and a small “COUNTY” sticker added to the bottom. As signs grew old, they were replaced with the standard county road pentagon marker from the Manual on Uniform Traffic Control Devices. While this occurred throughout Florida, the part of the state south of State Road 70 was hit particularly hard by the transition from state to county control and maintenance.
