= Florida's 26th congressional district =

U.S. House district for Florida

Coordinates: 25°41′05″N 80°59′56″W

- Map of district boundaries
- Representative: Mario Díaz-Balart; R–Miami
- Area: 5,171 mi^{2} (13,390 km^{2})
- Distribution: 97.7% urban; 2.3% rural
- Population (2025): 830,512
- Median household income: $80,017
- Ethnicity: 73.0% Hispanic; 19.4% White; 4.8% Black; 1.2% Two or more races; 1.1% Asian; 0.5% other
- Cook PVI: R+7

Florida's 26th congressional district is an electoral district for the U.S. Congress, which was first created in South Florida in 2013 as a result of Florida's population gain in the 2010 census. In the 2020 redistricting cycle, it was drawn as a successor to the previous 25th district, and includes most of inland Collier County, as well as the northwestern suburbs of Miami, including Doral, Hialeah, Miami Lakes, and some neighborhoods in Miami itself, such as Allapattah and Wynwood. The previous iteration of the 26th district, which included Monroe County and the southwestern suburbs of Miami, was instead renamed as the newly created 28th district.

From 2013 to 2023, the 26th district was located in far South Florida, and contained all of Monroe County, as well as a portion of south-west Miami-Dade County. Geographically, it was the successor to the old 25th district, and included Homestead, Key Largo, Marathon, and Key West, as well as Florida International University, Key West International Airport, and all three of Florida's national parks.

Republican Mario Díaz-Balart currently represents the district.

== Characteristics ==
According to the APM Research Lab's Voter Profile Tools (featuring the U.S. Census Bureau's 2019 American Community Survey), the district contained about 482,000 potential voters (citizens, age 18+). Of these, 68% are Latino, 18% White, and 12% Black. Nearly half (49%) of the district's potential voters are immigrants. The median income among households (with one or more potential voter) in the district is about $68,200, while 11% of households live below the poverty line. As for the educational attainment of potential voters in the district, 15% of those 25 and older have not earned a high school degree, while 28% hold a bachelor's or higher degree.

== Recent election results from statewide races ==
The 2010s iteration of this district was the only one in the U.S. to vote for the Democratic candidate for President in 2012 and 2016, then flip to the Republican candidate in 2020. In contrast, the district's 2020s iteration was the only one in the U.S. to vote for the Republican candidate for President in 2008 and 2012, only to flip once to the Democratic candidate in 2016 and then back to the Republicans in 2020.

Year	Office	Results
2008	President	McCain 55% - 45%
2010	Senate	Rubio 61% - 16%
2010	Governor	Scott 60% - 40%
2010	Attorney General	Bondi 61% - 35%
2010	Chief Financial Officer	Atwater 62% - 32%
2012	President	Romney 51% - 49%
2012	Senate	Nelson 52% - 48%
2014	Governor	Scott 58% - 42%
2016	President	Clinton 50% - 47%
2016	Senate	Rubio 57% - 41%
2018	Senate	Scott 55% - 45%
2018	Governor	DeSantis 54% - 45%
2018	Attorney General	Moody 55% - 43%
2018	Chief Financial Officer	Patronis 56% - 44%
2020	President	Trump 59% - 41%
2022	Senate	Rubio 70% - 30%
2022	Governor	DeSantis 70% - 29%
2022	Attorney General	Moody 69% - 31%
2022	Chief Financial Officer	Patronis 70% - 30%
2024	President	Trump 67% - 32%
2024	Senate	Scott 68% - 31%

== Composition ==
For the 118th and successive Congresses (based on redistricting following the 2020 census), the district contains all or portions of the following counties and communities:

Collier County (17)

Ave Maria, Berkshire Lakes, Chokoloskee, Everglades, Golden Gate, Heritage Bay, Immokalee (part; also 18th), Island Walk, Lely, Lely Resort, Marco Shores-Hammock Bay, Naples Manor, Orangetree, Plantation Island, Verona Walk, Vineyards, Winding Cypress

Miami-Dade County (13)

Brownsville (part; also 24th), Country Club, Doral, Gladeview (part; also 24th), Hialeah, Hialeah Gardens, Medley, Miami (part; also 24th and 27th), Miami Lakes, Miami Springs, Palm Springs North, Virginia Gardens, West Little River (part; also 24th)

== List of members representing the district ==
Representative	Party	Years	Cong ress	Electoral history	Geography
District created January 3, 2013
Joe Garcia (Miami)	Democratic	January 3, 2013 – January 3, 2015	113th	Elected in 2012. Lost re-election.	2013–2017
Carlos Curbelo (Miami)	Republican	January 3, 2015 – January 3, 2019	114th 115th	Elected in 2014. Re-elected in 2016. Lost re-election.	2013–2017
Carlos Curbelo (Miami)	Republican	January 3, 2015 – January 3, 2019	114th 115th	Elected in 2014. Re-elected in 2016. Lost re-election.	2017–2023
Debbie Mucarsel-Powell (Miami)	Democratic	January 3, 2019 – January 3, 2021	116th	Elected in 2018. Lost re-election.	2017–2023
Carlos Giménez (Miami)	Republican	January 3, 2021 – January 3, 2023	117th	Elected in 2020. Redistricted to the 28th district.	2017–2023
Mario Díaz-Balart (Miami)	Republican	January 3, 2023 – present	118th 119th	Redistricted from the 25th district and re-elected in 2022. Re-elected in 2024. Re-elected in 2026.	2023–2027: Most of inland Collier County and the northwest of Miami-Dade County

== Election results ==
=== 2012 ===
2012 Florida's 26th congressional district election
Party	Candidate	Votes	%
Democratic	Joe Garcia	135,694	53.6
Republican	David Rivera	108,820	43.0
Total votes		252,957	100.0

=== 2014 ===
2014 Florida's 26th congressional district election
Party	Candidate	Votes	%
Republican	Carlos Curbelo	83,031	51.5
Democratic	Joe Garcia (incumbent)	78,306	48.5
Total votes		161,337	100.0
Republican gain from Democratic			

=== 2016 ===
2016 Florida's 26th congressional district election
Party	Candidate	Votes	%
Republican	Carlos Curbelo (incumbent)	148,547	53.0
Democratic	Joe Garcia	115,493	41.2
Total votes		280,542	100.0
Republican hold			

=== 2018 ===
2018 Florida's 26th congressional district election
Party	Candidate	Votes	%
Democratic	Debbie Mucarsel-Powell	119,797	50.9
Republican	Carlos Curbelo (incumbent)	115,678	49.1
Total votes		235,475	100.0
Democratic gain from Republican			

=== 2020 ===
2020 Florida's 26th congressional district election
Party	Candidate	Votes	%
Republican	Carlos A. Giménez	177,211	51.7
Democratic	Debbie Mucarsel-Powell (incumbent)	165,377	48.3
Total votes		342,588	100.0
Republican gain from Democratic			

=== 2022 ===
2022 Florida's 26th congressional district election
Party	Candidate	Votes	%
Republican	Mario Díaz-Balart (incumbent)	143,240	70.8
Democratic	Christine Olivo	58,868	29.1
Total votes		202,108	100.0
Republican hold			

=== 2024 ===
2024 Florida's 26th congressional district election
Party	Candidate	Votes	%
Republican	Mario Díaz-Balart (incumbent)	217,199	70.92
Democratic	Joey Atkins	89,072	29.08
Total votes		306,271	100.0
Republican hold			
