= Pelican Marsh, Florida =

- Census-designated place
- Location within Florida Location within the United States
- Coordinates: 26°15′08″N 81°46′53″W
- Country: United States
- State: Florida
- County: Collier

Area
  - Total: 2.10 sq mi (5.44 km^{2})
  - Land: 1.95 sq mi (5.04 km^{2})
  - Water: 0.16 sq mi (0.41 km^{2})
- Elevation: 13 ft (4.0 m)

Population (2020)
  - Total: 2,453
  - Density: 1,261.7/sq mi (487.15/km^{2})
- Time zone: UTC-5 (Eastern (EST))
  - Summer (DST): UTC-4 (EDT)
- ZIP Codes: 34108, 34109 (Naples)
- Area code: 239
- FIPS code: 12-55680
- GNIS feature ID: 2806007

Pelican Marsh is a census-designated place (CDP) in northwestern Collier County, Florida, United States. It is bordered to the west by Naples Park and to the south by Pine Ridge, and it is 8 miles (13 km) north of Naples. U.S. Route 41 (Tamiami Trail) forms the western edge of the community.

Pelican Marsh was first listed as a CDP prior to the 2020 census. The population was 2,453 at the 2020 census. It is a part of the Naples-Marco Island, Florida Metropolitan Statistical Area.

== Demographics ==
Historical population
Census	Pop.	Note	%±
2020	2,453		—
U.S. Decennial Census

Pelican Marsh first appeared as a census designated place in the 2020 U.S. census.

=== 2020 census ===
As of the 2020 census, Pelican Marsh had a population of 2,453. The median age was 71.4 years. 4.3% of residents were under the age of 18 and 67.9% of residents were 65 years of age or older. For every 100 females there were 88.4 males, and for every 100 females age 18 and over there were 88.6 males age 18 and over.

100.0% of residents lived in urban areas, while 0.0% lived in rural areas.

There were 1,327 households in Pelican Marsh, of which 5.7% had children under the age of 18 living in them. Of all households, 64.3% were married-couple households, 10.6% were households with a male householder and no spouse or partner present, and 22.0% were households with a female householder and no spouse or partner present. About 28.4% of all households were made up of individuals and 21.8% had someone living alone who was 65 years of age or older.

There were 2,050 housing units, of which 35.3% were vacant. The homeowner vacancy rate was 3.1% and the rental vacancy rate was 17.0%.

Racial composition as of the 2020 census
Race	Number	Percent
White	2,322	94.7%
Black or African American	12	0.5%
American Indian and Alaska Native	1	0.0%
Asian	36	1.5%
Native Hawaiian and Other Pacific Islander	0	0.0%
Some other race	12	0.5%
Two or more races	70	2.9%
Hispanic or Latino (of any race)	68	2.8%
