= Waterside Shops =

- Location: Pelican Bay, FL
- Coordinates: 26.2132°N 81.8025°W
- Opened: November 1992; 34 years ago
- Developer: Westinghouse Communities of Naples, Inc. and the Courtelis Company
- Manager: Forbes-Cohen and Simon Malls
- Owner: Forbes-Cohen
- Architect: Dorsky Hodges & Partners Inc.
- Num. of stores: 60
- Num. of anchor tenants: 2 (1 open, 1 vacant)
- Floor area: 280,000 square feet
- Floors: 1
- Website: Waterside Shops

Waterside Shops is an open-air mall located on Tamiami Trail in Pelican Bay, Florida, just to the north of Naples, Florida. Opened in November 1992, the mall features Saks Fifth Avenue as the anchor tenant. The mall opened with 85% of its retail space leased. Since 2003, the mall has been managed by the Southfield, Michigan-based Forbes Company, which also operates several other upscale malls in Michigan and Florida. Its open-air concourses feature waterfalls and landscaping. Some of the more popular stores the mall has are Gucci, Louis Vuitton, Tesla, Rolex, and among others.

== History ==
Upon opening, the mall originally featured tropical pond-like fountains surrounded by landscaping of lush foliage, along with stone walkways and columns. Predominantly Mediterranean in terms of cosmetic theming, this original appearance would remain unchanged until the arrival of a mid-2000s overhaul project, one which sought to transform the property into much more of a luxury destination. Though much of the older landscaping was toned down around that time, the fountains would remain, though still vastly altered to fit the new sleek, modern, and more so ritzy appeal of the property's new era. In addition to all the visual alterations, higher end tenants would also be brought in to replace many middle-ground businesses. These changes likely stemmed from a greater goal to differentiate Waterside from nearby outdoor lifestyle malls catering to the middle class. Now poised to serve a higher income bracket, Waterside Shops would go on to draw in a large number of highly exclusive tenants.

In 2005, Nordstrom signed a letter of intent to open a new two-level 80,000 square foot location at Waterside Shops. The move would come as part of a larger effort to revitalize the property after the closure of Jacobson's. A new wing was also proposed to connect Nordstrom with the existing common spaces, slicing through the shuttered Jacobson's, while simultaneously adding new in-line space on each side. The expansion would feature large palmetto trees in the center of the new walkway with shaded bench seating beneath the towering fronds overhead.

In 2007, Saks Fifth Avenue would begin expanding outward, to the west of its existing site. Though they still kept their original building, the luxury department store chain simply opted to enlarge its footprint at the mall via an addition tacked on to the side. Interior renovations to the building would also be put underway around that time.

In the fall seasons of 2008, Nordstrom opened its doors at the mall to much fanfare from wealthy locals all around the region. The Waterside location would end up being Nordstrom's first and only full line store in Southwest Florida, up until its later closure.

Throughout the 2010s, some tenants would come and go, though the mall would remain virtually unscathed by this as occupancy rates remained remarkably high overall. Unlike other regional malls during that time, which often had trouble securing replacement stores of comparable quality to ones who left, Waterside somehow managed to retain a full roster of vibrant high-end brands, even with of course, some notable departures.

In May 2020, it was revealed that Nordstrom would be closing this location permanently as part of a plan to close 16 locations nationwide. This move effectively left Saks Fifth Avenue as the mall's only remaining anchor tenant.

On February 16, 2024 it was reported that Barnes & Noble would be closing its Waterside Shops outparcel location as a part of a nationwide restructuring effort to pivot towards off-mall operations better in line with their renewed store placement strategy. In tune with corporate planning, the store permanently closed to the public on the evening of July 23, 2024.

In the summer of 2024, one of Waterside's most ambitious renovation proposals to date was submitted. Plans included the demolition of ((Nordstrom))'s former department store anchor, which had been vacant for nearly half a decade. In addition to that, by the end of 2025, both ((Williams-Sonoma)) and ((Pottery Barn)) would see their longtime in-line stores relocated to a two-level outparcel building formerly occupied by ((Barnes & Noble)). As far as the common areas of the mall went, those too would receive a facelift, with cosmetic enhancements such as the replacement of lighting fixtures, floor tiles, and more.

Prior to the 2024 revampment, the center had last been renovated beginning in 2006, with updated water features and a new palm-lined concourse leading out to the mall's ((Nordstrom)) anchor (which would open by the end of 2008) to the north end of the property. The in-line tenants situated within the new concourse essentially swallowed up what was left of the former ((Jacobson's)) anchor, which had been shuttered years prior.

Though brief talks had surfaced in the past of Von Maur potentially filling the void left behind by Nordstrom, those plans would never end up coming to fruition. Since Von Maur failed to act in a timely manner in its proposals to repurpose the building, Forbes Co. (Waterside's owner) determined it would find an alternative solution for re-use of the space.

In late September of 2024, demolition would officially begin on both the vacant Nordstrom building, in addition to a covered pedestrian bridge connecting the store with a nearby parking deck. Work would conclude by the end of 2024’s fall season, seeing the site graded over to await redevelopment. Currently, plans are in the works to have the site reimagined by luxury home furnishings chain Restoration Hardware (stylized as simply RH). The gallery is expected to feature a rooftop restaurant in addition to three levels of net retail selling space.

== Junior anchors ==
Former

- Barnes & Noble {original tenant} (1992-2024)
