= Fiddler's Creek community development districts =

Two districts in Collier County, Florida

Fiddler's Creek Community Development District #1 and #2 are community development districts in Collier County, Florida, established in 1996 by Chapter 42X, Florida Administrative Code by the Florida Land and Water Adjudicatory Commission pursuant to the provisions of Chapter 190, Florida Statutes. Each district owns, controls, operates or maintains various properties and facilities within the district, including lakes and ponds, roads, landscaping and sidewalks.

Fiddler's Creek CDD #1 encompasses an area of approximately 1,389.77 acres within the Fiddler's Creek Development of Regional Impact, a master planned, mixed-use community located in Collier County. Fiddler's Creek CDD #2 encompasses an area of approximately 998.79 acres within the Fiddler's Creek Development.

Under Florida law, a community development district is a local, special purpose government framework and is an alternative to municipal incorporation for managing and financing infrastructure required to support development of a community.

Both community development districts are located south of Naples on Collier Boulevard and Tamiami Trail East. Fiddler's Creek is a master-planned residential community. Of the community's 4,000 acres, less than one-third is developed for residential use, the remainder being dedicated primarily to nature preserves, lakes, golf courses and recreation areas.
