= Winding Cypress, Florida =

- Census-designated place
- Location within Florida Location within the United States
- Coordinates: 26°03′51″N 81°40′41″W
- Country: United States
- State: Florida
- County: Collier

Area
  - Total: 1.94 sq mi (5.03 km^{2})
  - Land: 1.85 sq mi (4.80 km^{2})
  - Water: 0.089 sq mi (0.23 km^{2})
- Elevation: 7 ft (2.1 m)

Population (2020)
  - Total: 697
  - Density: 376.2/sq mi (145.24/km^{2})
- Time zone: UTC-5 (Eastern (EST))
  - Summer (DST): UTC-4 (EDT)
- ZIP Code: 34114 (Naples)
- Area code: 239
- FIPS code: 12-78063
- GNIS feature ID: 2806009

Winding Cypress is a census-designated place (CDP) in western Collier County, Florida, United States. It is 9 miles (14 km) southeast of Naples and is bordered to the southwest by U.S. Route 41 (Tamiami Trail) and to the north by the community of Verona Walk.

Winding Cypress was first listed as a CDP prior to the 2020 census. The population was 697 at the 2020 census. It is part of the Naples-Marco Island, Florida Metropolitan Statistical Area.

== Demographics ==
Historical population
Census	Pop.	Note	%±
2020	697		—
U.S. Decennial Census

Winding Cypress first appeared as a census designated place in the 2020 U.S. census.

=== Racial and ethnic composition ===
Winding Cypress CDP, Florida – Racial and ethnic composition Note: the US Census treats Hispanic/Latino as an ethnic category. This table excludes Latinos from the racial categories and assigns them to a separate category. Hispanics/Latinos may be of any race.
Race / Ethnicity (NH = Non-Hispanic)	Pop 2020	2020
White alone (NH)	639	91.68%
Black or African American alone (NH)	11	1.58%
Native American or Alaska Native alone (NH)	0	0.00%
Asian alone (NH)	9	1.29%
Native Hawaiian or Pacific Islander alone (NH)	0	0.00%
Other race alone (NH)	1	0.14%
Mixed race or Multiracial (NH)	8	1.15%
Hispanic or Latino (any race)	29	4.16%
Total	697	100.00%
