= Pine Ridge, Florida =

Pine Ridge is the name of several places in the U.S. state of Florida:

- Pine Ridge, Citrus County, Florida
- Pine Ridge, Collier County, Florida
