= Plantation Island =

Plantation Island may refer to:

- Plantation Island, Florida
- Malolo Lailai, Fiji
