= Lely, Florida =

- Census-designated place
- Location in Collier County and the state of Florida
- Coordinates: 26°06′11″N 81°43′47″W
- Country: United States
- State: Florida
- County: Collier

Area
  - Total: 1.47 sq mi (3.82 km^{2})
  - Land: 1.37 sq mi (3.55 km^{2})
  - Water: 0.10 sq mi (0.27 km^{2})
- Elevation: 7 ft (2.1 m)

Population (2020)
  - Total: 3,694
  - Density: 2,692.3/sq mi (1,039.49/km^{2})
- Time zone: UTC-5 (Eastern (EST))
  - Summer (DST): UTC-4 (EDT)
- ZIP code: 34113
- Area code: 239
- FIPS code: 12-39987
- GNIS feature ID: 2403229

Lely is a census-designated place (CDP) in Collier County, Florida, United States. The population was 3,694 at the 2020 census, up from 3,451 at the 2010 census. It is part of the Naples–Marco Island Metropolitan Statistical Area.

== Geography ==
Lely is located in western Collier County. It is bordered on the southwest by U.S. Route 41, on the south by Naples Manor, and on the southeast by Lely Resort. Downtown Naples is 5 miles (8 km) to the northwest on U.S. 41.

According to the United States Census Bureau, the Lely CDP has a total area of 1.5 square miles (3.8 km^{2}), of which 1.4 square miles (3.5 km^{2}) is land and 0.12 square miles (0.3 km^{2}), or 7.04%, is water.

== Demographics ==
Historical population
Census	Pop.	Note	%±
1990	3,014		—
2000	3,857		28.0%
2010	3,451		−10.5%
2020	3,694		7.0%
U.S. Decennial Census

=== 2020 census ===
As of the 2020 census, Lely had a population of 3,694. The median age was 67.7 years. 7.8% of residents were under the age of 18 and 54.9% were 65 years of age or older. For every 100 females, there were 81.7 males, and for every 100 females age 18 and over there were 80.4 males age 18 and over.

100.0% of residents lived in urban areas, while 0.0% lived in rural areas.

There were 1,894 households in Lely, of which 9.6% had children under the age of 18 living in them. There were 1,030 families residing in the CDP. Of all households, 40.3% were married-couple households, 19.2% were households with a male householder and no spouse or partner present, and 35.2% were households with a female householder and no spouse or partner present. About 44.3% of all households were made up of individuals, and 33.7% had someone living alone who was 65 years of age or older.

There were 2,756 housing units, of which 31.3% were vacant. The homeowner vacancy rate was 2.3% and the rental vacancy rate was 6.5%.

Lely racial composition (Hispanics excluded from racial categories) (NH = Non-Hispanic)
Race	Number	Percentage
White (NH)	3,051	82.59%
Black or African American (NH)	176	4.76%
Native American or Alaska Native (NH)	5	0.14%
Asian (NH)	28	0.76%
Pacific Islander (NH)	1	0.03%
Some Other Race (NH)	7	0.19%
Mixed/Multi-Racial (NH)	65	1.76%
Hispanic or Latino	361	9.77%
Total	3,694	

=== 2000 census ===
As of the census of 2000, there were 3,857 people, 2,037 households, and 1,179 families residing in the CDP. The population density was 2,638.9 inhabitants per square mile (1,018.9/km^{2}). There were 2,641 housing units at an average density of 1,806.9 per square mile (697.6/km^{2}). The racial makeup of the CDP was 97.41% White, 0.70% African American, 0.16% Native American, 0.44% Asian, 0.91% from other races, and 0.39% from two or more races. Hispanic or Latino of any race were 3.71% of the population.

There were 2,037 households, out of which 8.7% had children under the age of 18 living with them, 52.7% were married couples living together, 3.8% had a female householder with no husband present, and 42.1% were non-families. 37.8% of all households were made up of individuals, and 26.3% had someone living alone who was 65 years of age or older. The average household size was 1.82 and the average family size was 2.33.

In the CDP, the population was spread out, with 8.1% under the age of 18, 2.8% from 18 to 24, 13.1% from 25 to 44, 25.8% from 45 to 64, and 50.2% who were 65 years of age or older. The median age was 65 years. For every 100 females, there were 82.2 males. For every 100 females age 18 and over, there were 80.2 males.

The median income for a household in the CDP was $45,170, and the median income for a family was $57,361. Males had a median income of $40,719 versus $31,139 for females. The per capita income for the CDP was $32,430. About 5.1% of families and 6.3% of the population were below the poverty line, including 6.2% of those under age 18 and 8.9% of those age 65 or over.
