= Heritage Bay, Florida =

- Census-designated place
- Location within Florida Location within the United States
- Coordinates: 26°17′02″N 81°39′46″W
- Country: United States
- State: Florida
- County: Collier

Area
  - Total: 1.10 sq mi (2.85 km^{2})
  - Land: 0.66 sq mi (1.71 km^{2})
  - Water: 0.44 sq mi (1.13 km^{2})
- Elevation: 13 ft (4.0 m)

Population (2020)
  - Total: 1,117
  - Density: 1,689.6/sq mi (652.35/km^{2})
- Time zone: UTC-5 (Eastern (EST))
  - Summer (DST): UTC-4 (EDT)
- ZIP Code: 34120 (Naples)
- Area code: 239
- FIPS code: 12-29381
- GNIS feature ID: 2806004

Heritage Bay is a census-designated place (CDP) in northern Collier County, Florida, United States. It is 18 miles (29 km) northeast of Naples and 12 miles (19 km) southeast of Bonita Springs.

The community was first listed as a CDP prior to the 2020 census. The population was 1,117 at the 2020 census. It is part of the Naples-Marco Island, Florida Metropolitan Statistical Area.

== Demographics ==
Historical population
Census	Pop.	Note	%±
2020	1,117		—
U.S. Decennial Census

Heritage Bay first appeared as a census designated place in the 2020 U.S. census.

=== 2020 census ===
As of the 2020 census, Heritage Bay had a population of 1,117. The median age was 70.3 years. 2.0% of residents were under the age of 18 and 69.9% of residents were 65 years of age or older. For every 100 females there were 105.0 males, and for every 100 females age 18 and over there were 103.5 males age 18 and over.

100.0% of residents lived in urban areas, while 0.0% lived in rural areas.

There were 612 households in Heritage Bay, of which 4.9% had children under the age of 18 living in them. Of all households, 69.0% were married-couple households, 16.3% were households with a male householder and no spouse or partner present, and 12.1% were households with a female householder and no spouse or partner present. About 23.9% of all households were made up of individuals and 16.4% had someone living alone who was 65 years of age or older.

There were 1,387 housing units, of which 55.9% were vacant. The homeowner vacancy rate was 6.5% and the rental vacancy rate was 27.5%.

Racial composition as of the 2020 census
Race	Number	Percent
White	1,070	95.8%
Black or African American	6	0.5%
American Indian and Alaska Native	0	0.0%
Asian	6	0.5%
Native Hawaiian and Other Pacific Islander	0	0.0%
Some other race	10	0.9%
Two or more races	25	2.2%
Hispanic or Latino (of any race)	32	2.9%
