= Collier Area Transit =

Public transit system in Collier County, Florida

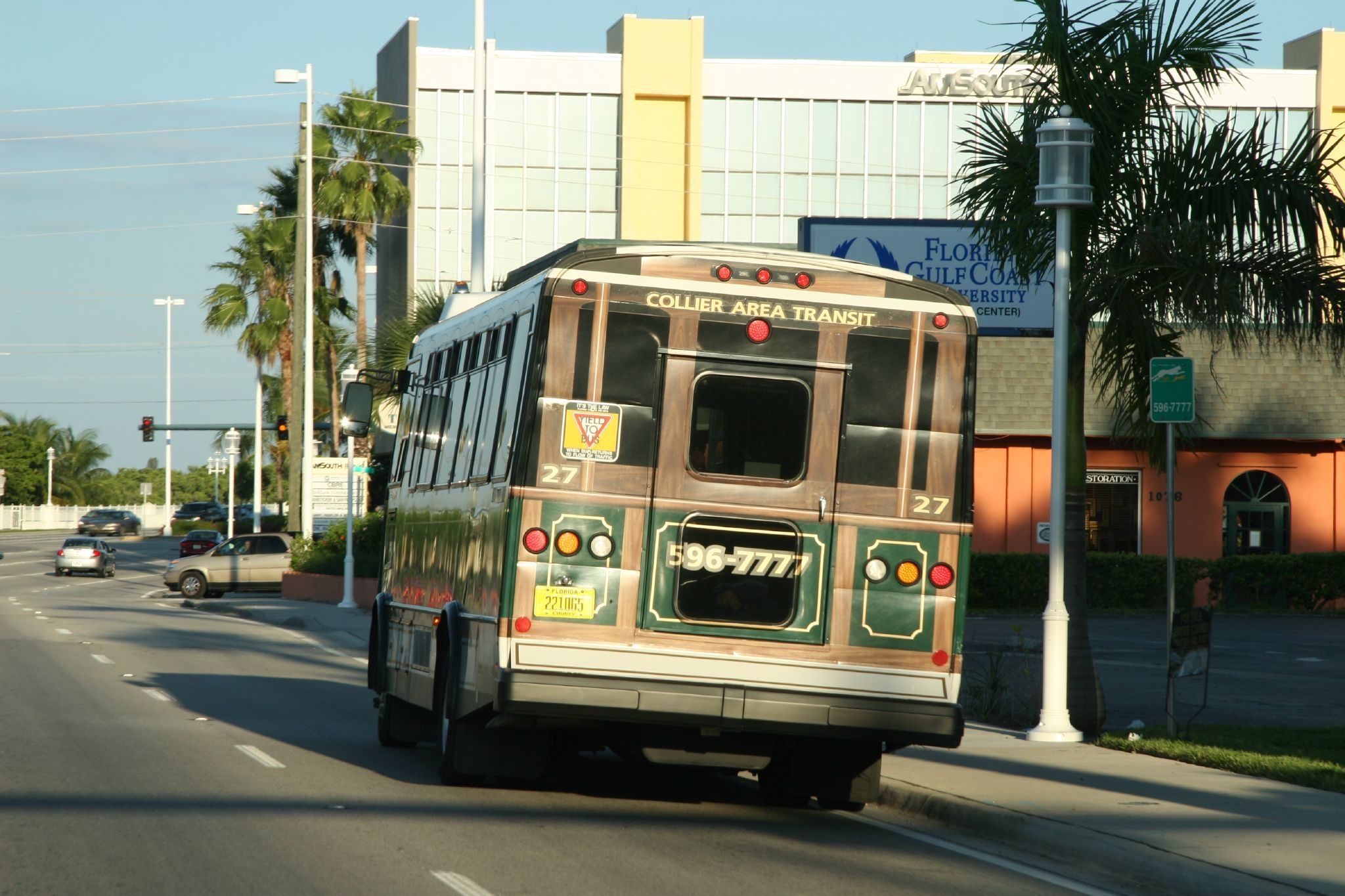
- Founded: 2001
- Headquarters: 8300 Radio Rd; Naples, FL 34104
- Service area: Collier County
- Service type: Bus service, Paratransit
- Alliance: LinC
- Routes: 16
- Hubs: Collier County Govt Center
- Fleet: 53
- Daily ridership: 3,850 (weekday)
- Operator: MV Transportation
- Chief executive: 140
- Website: Collier Area Transit (CAT) Website

Collier Area Transit (CAT) is the public transportation system in Collier County, Florida. Regular transit bus service and the paratransit system are administered by the Collier County Department of Alternative Transportation Modes. Service is provided to Immokalee, Marco Island, Golden Gate and the City of Naples area, seven days a week from 6 a.m. to 7:30 p.m. depending on the route.

December 2025 saw some of their fleet get new Lecip fareboxes, but by March the whole fleet followed suit.

== Routes ==
As of 2019, there are 21 bus routes. Keolis does not operate here anymore. CAT is now operated by MV Transportation.
