= Marco Shores-Hammock Bay, Florida =

- Census-designated place
- Location within Florida Location within the United States
- Coordinates: 25°59′58″N 81°41′10″W
- Country: United States
- State: Florida
- County: Collier

Area
  - Total: 1.08 sq mi (2.80 km^{2})
  - Land: 0.89 sq mi (2.30 km^{2})
  - Water: 0.20 sq mi (0.51 km^{2})
- Elevation: 3 ft (0.91 m)

Population (2020)
  - Total: 957
  - Density: 1,079.4/sq mi (416.76/km^{2})
- Time zone: UTC-5 (Eastern (EST))
  - Summer (DST): UTC-4 (EDT)
- ZIP Code: 34114 (Naples)
- Area code: 239
- FIPS code: 12-43090
- GNIS feature ID: 2806006

Marco Shores-Hammock Bay is a census-designated place (CDP) in western Collier County, Florida, United States. It is 13 miles (21 km) southeast of Naples and 3 miles (5 km) north of Marco Island, and contains the Hammock Bay Golf and Country Club and the Marco Island Executive Airport. It is bordered to the west by Florida State Road 951 (Collier Boulevard) and to the south by McIlvane Bay.

The location was first listed as a CDP prior to the 2020 census. The population was 957 at the 2020 census. It is a part of the Naples-Marco Island, Florida Metropolitan Statistical Area.

== Demographics ==
Historical population
Census	Pop.	Note	%±
2020	957		—
U.S. Decennial Census

Marco Shores-Hammock Bay first appeared as a census designated place in the 2020 U.S. census.

=== Racial and ethnic composition ===
Marco Shores-Hammock Bay CDP, Florida – Racial and ethnic composition Note: the US Census treats Hispanic/Latino as an ethnic category. This table excludes Latinos from the racial categories and assigns them to a separate category. Hispanics/Latinos may be of any race.
Race / Ethnicity (NH = Non-Hispanic)	Pop 2020	2020
White alone (NH)	861	89.97%
Black or African American alone (NH)	6	0.63%
Native American or Alaska Native alone (NH)	1	0.10%
Asian alone (NH)	16	1.67%
Native Hawaiian or Pacific Islander alone (NH)	0	0.00%
Other race alone (NH)	3	0.31%
Mixed race or Multiracial (NH)	6	0.63%
Hispanic or Latino (any race)	64	6.69%
Total	957	100.00%
