= Berkshire Lakes, Florida =

- Census-designated place
- Location within Florida Location within the United States
- Coordinates: 26°09′37″N 81°43′39″W
- Country: United States
- State: Florida
- County: Collier

Area
  - Total: 0.78 sq mi (2.02 km^{2})
  - Land: 0.66 sq mi (1.70 km^{2})
  - Water: 0.12 sq mi (0.32 km^{2})
- Elevation: 3 ft (0.91 m)

Population (2020)
  - Total: 2,527
  - Density: 3,845/sq mi (1,484.5/km^{2})
- Time zone: UTC-5 (Eastern (EST))
  - Summer (DST): UTC-4 (EDT)
- ZIP Code: 34104 (Naples)
- Area code: 239
- FIPS code: 12-05806
- GNIS feature ID: 2806002

Berkshire Lakes is a census-designated place (CDP) in western Collier County, Florida, United States. It is 5 miles (8 km) east of Naples and is bordered to the northeast by Interstate 75.

Berkshire Lakes was first listed as a CDP prior to the 2020 census. The population was 2,527 at the 2020 census. It is a part of the Naples-Marco Island, Florida Metropolitan Statistical Area.

== Demographics ==
Historical population
Census	Pop.	Note	%±
2020	2,527		—
U.S. Decennial Census

Berkshire Lakes first appeared as a census designated place in the 2020 U.S. census.

=== 2020 census ===
As of the 2020 census, Berkshire Lakes had a population of 2,527. The median age was 60.3 years. 11.1% of residents were under the age of 18 and 40.9% of residents were 65 years of age or older. For every 100 females there were 85.0 males, and for every 100 females age 18 and over there were 80.5 males age 18 and over.

100.0% of residents lived in urban areas, while 0.0% lived in rural areas.

There were 1,254 households in Berkshire Lakes, of which 13.6% had children under the age of 18 living in them. Of all households, 48.6% were married-couple households, 13.6% were households with a male householder and no spouse or partner present, and 32.2% were households with a female householder and no spouse or partner present. About 34.4% of all households were made up of individuals and 24.3% had someone living alone who was 65 years of age or older.

There were 1,635 housing units, of which 23.3% were vacant. The homeowner vacancy rate was 2.1% and the rental vacancy rate was 9.9%.

Racial composition as of the 2020 census
Race	Number	Percent
White	2,052	81.2%
Black or African American	88	3.5%
American Indian and Alaska Native	1	0.0%
Asian	51	2.0%
Native Hawaiian and Other Pacific Islander	0	0.0%
Some other race	75	3.0%
Two or more races	260	10.3%
Hispanic or Latino (of any race)	341	13.5%
