= North Naples, Florida =

- Unincorporated community
- Location within the state of Florida North Naples (the United States)
- Coordinates: 26°13′09″N 81°47′30″W
- Country: United States
- State: Florida
- County: Collier
- Elevation: 13 ft (4.0 m)
- Time zone: UTC-5 (Eastern (EST))
  - Summer (DST): UTC-4 (EDT)
- ZIP codes: 34107-34110, 34119
- GNIS feature ID: 287841

North Naples is an unincorporated community in northwest Collier County, Florida, United States, located immediately north of Naples. The North Naples area includes the census-designated places of Naples Park, Pelican Bay, and Pine Ridge, as well as additional surrounding land.

North Naples is part of the Naples–Marco Island Metropolitan Statistical Area.

== Geography ==
=== Climate ===
North Naples has a tropical climate with warm dry winters and hot humid summers with heavy rain, despite it being north of the tropics. It is a part of one of the only tropical climates in the continental USA.

== Education ==
North Naples is served by the District School Board of Collier County and various private institutions including the following.

=== Elementary ===
- Pelican Marsh Elementary School (public)
- Naples Park Elementary School (public)
- Laurel Oak Elementary School (public)
- Veterans Memorial Elementary School (public)
- The Village School (private)

=== Middle ===
- North Naples Middle School (public)
- The Village School (private)
- Pine Ridge Middle School (public)
- Oakridge Middle School (public)
- Mason Classical Academy (charter)

=== High ===
- Barron Collier High School (public)
- Gulf Coast High School (public)
- Aubrey Rogers High School (public)
- The Village School (private)
- Mason Classical Academy (charter)

== Public transportation ==
North Naples is served by Collier Area Transit's 2A, 2B, 6, and 10 routes.

== Healthcare ==
North Naples is served by North Naples Hospital, part of the NCH system.
