= Naples Park, Florida =

- Census-designated place
- Location in Collier County and the state of Florida
- Coordinates: 26°15′48″N 81°48′34″W
- Country: United States
- State: {Florida
- County: Collier

Area
  - Total: 1.23 sq mi (3.19 km^{2})
  - Land: 1.23 sq mi (3.19 km^{2})
  - Water: 0.0039 sq mi (0.01 km^{2})
- Elevation: 13 ft (4.0 m)

Population (2020)
  - Total: 5,092
  - Density: 4,140.0/sq mi (1,598.47/km^{2})
- Time zone: UTC-5 (Eastern (EST))
  - Summer (DST): UTC-4 (EDT)
- ZIP code: 34108
- Area code: 239
- FIPS code: 12-47675
- GNIS feature ID: 2403325

Naples Park is an unincorporated community and census-designated place (CDP) in Collier County, Florida, United States. The population was 5,092 at the 2020 census, down from 5,967 at the 2010 census. It is part of the Naples-Marco Island, Florida Metropolitan Statistical Area.

== History ==
Naples Park was officially opened on November 4, 1951. Constructed by M. H. Davis Properties, Inc. lots were initially being sold for as low as $149.00, designed for lower or retirement level income buyers. The Naples Park Area Association was founded in 1957 and a clubhouse was built by members four years later. The neighborhood had its own fire department until 1961, when the North Naples Fire District expanded into the area.

== Geography ==
Naples Park is located in northwestern Collier County. It is part of the area known as North Naples, just north of Pelican Bay. It is bounded to the east by U.S. Route 41, to the north by 111th Avenue North, to the west by Vanderbilt Drive, and to the south by 91st Avenue North. Vanderbilt Lagoon is to the west, connecting to the Gulf of Mexico. Downtown Naples is 8 miles (13 km) to the south.

The Mercato, an outdoor shopping mall to the east of U.S. Route 41 is also considered part of Naples Park. It is the only portion of Naples Park to the east of U.S. Route 41.

According to the United States Census Bureau, the Naples Park CDP has a total area of 1.2 square miles (3.2 km^{2}), all land.

== Demographics ==
Historical population
Census	Pop.	Note	%±
1970	3,201		—
1980	5,438		69.9%
1990	8,002		47.1%
2000	6,741		−15.8%
2010	5,967		−11.5%
2020	5,092		−14.7%

=== 2020 census ===
As of the 2020 census, Naples Park had a population of 5,092. The median age was 49.0 years. 14.1% of residents were under the age of 18 and 22.5% were 65 years of age or older. For every 100 females there were 100.7 males, and for every 100 females age 18 and over there were 100.2 males age 18 and over.

100.0% of residents lived in urban areas, while 0.0% lived in rural areas.

There were 2,320 households in Naples Park, including 1,265 families. Of all households, 18.5% had children under the age of 18 living in them, 40.2% were married-couple households, 22.5% were households with a male householder and no spouse or partner present, and 27.7% were households with a female householder and no spouse or partner present. About 32.6% of all households were made up of individuals, and 12.7% had someone living alone who was 65 years of age or older.

There were 3,346 housing units, of which 30.7% were vacant. The homeowner vacancy rate was 4.5% and the rental vacancy rate was 10.5%.

Naples Park racial composition (Hispanics excluded from racial categories) (NH = Non-Hispanic)
Race	Number	Percentage
White (NH)	3,635	71.39%
Black or African American (NH)	87	1.71%
Native American or Alaska Native (NH)	10	0.2%
Asian (NH)	104	2.04%
Pacific Islander (NH)	4	0.08%
Some Other Race (NH)	43	0.84%
Mixed/Multi-Racial (NH)	171	3.36%
Hispanic or Latino	1,038	20.38%
Total	5,092	

=== 2000 census ===
As of the census of 2000, there were 6,741 people, 2,737 households, and 1,757 families residing in the CDP. The population density was 5,541.4 inhabitants per square mile (2,139.5/km^{2}). There were 3,145 housing units at an average density of 2,585.3 per square mile (998.2/km^{2}). The racial makeup of the CDP was 91.90% White, 1.32% African American, 0.13% Native American, 0.85% Asian, 0.06% Pacific Islander, 4.58% from other races, and 1.16% from two or more races. Hispanic or Latino of any race were 17.56% of the population.

There were 2,737 households, out of which 28.9% had children under the age of 18 living with them, 47.4% were married couples living together, 10.8% had a female householder with no husband present, and 35.8% were non-families. 24.9% of all households were made up of individuals, and 7.9% had someone living alone who was 65 years of age or older. The average household size was 2.46 and the average family size was 2.88.

In the CDP, the population was spread out, with 22.4% under the age of 18, 7.3% from 18 to 24, 33.1% from 25 to 44, 22.2% from 45 to 64, and 15.0% who were 65 years of age or older. The median age was 37 years. For every 100 females, there were 106.0 males. For every 100 females age 18 and over, there were 107.5 males.

The median income for a household in the CDP was $41,820, and the median income for a family was $45,441. Males had a median income of $27,923 versus $28,038 for females. The per capita income for the CDP was $21,150. About 4.6% of families and 7.8% of the population were below the poverty line, including 12.1% of those under age 18 and 4.6% of those age 65 or over.
