= Naples Manor, Florida =

- Census-designated place
- Location in Collier County and the state of Florida
- Coordinates: 26°05′21″N 81°43′31″W
- Country: United States
- State: Florida
- County: Collier

Area
  - Total: 0.70 sq mi (1.82 km^{2})
  - Land: 0.68 sq mi (1.77 km^{2})
  - Water: 0.019 sq mi (0.05 km^{2})
- Elevation: 7 ft (2.1 m)

Population (2020)
  - Total: 5,132
  - Density: 7,498.6/sq mi (2,895.22/km^{2})
- Time zone: UTC-5 (Eastern (EST))
  - Summer (DST): UTC-4 (EDT)
- ZIP code: 34113
- Area code: 239
- FIPS code: 12-47650
- GNIS feature ID: 2403324

Naples Manor is a census-designated place (CDP) in Collier County, Florida, United States. The population was 5,132 at the 2020 census, down from 5,562 at the 2010 census. It is part of the Naples–Marco Island Metropolitan Statistical Area.

== Geography ==
Naples Manor is located in western Collier County. It is bordered to the southwest by U.S. Route 41, to the north by Lely, and to the east by Lely Resort. Downtown Naples is 5 miles (8 km) to the northwest on U.S. 41.

According to the United States Census Bureau, the Naples Manor CDP has a total area of 0.69 square miles (1.8 km^{2}), of which 0.02 square miles (0.05 km^{2}), or 2.91%, is water.

== Demographics ==
Historical population
Census	Pop.	Note	%±
2000	5,186		—
2010	5,562		7.3%
2020	5,132		−7.7%
U.S. Decennial Census

=== 2020 census ===
Naples Manor racial composition (Hispanics excluded from racial categories) (NH = Non-Hispanic)
Race	Number	Percentage
White (NH)	309	6.02%
Black or African American (NH)	1,086	21.16%
Native American or Alaska Native (NH)	5	0.1%
Asian (NH)	9	0.18%
Some Other Race (NH)	15	0.29%
Mixed/Multi-Racial (NH)	63	1.23%
Hispanic or Latino	3,645	71.02%
Total	5,132	

As of the 2020 census, Naples Manor had a population of 5,132. The median age was 31.4 years. 29.6% of residents were under the age of 18 and 8.5% of residents were 65 years of age or older. For every 100 females there were 99.1 males, and for every 100 females age 18 and over there were 100.8 males age 18 and over.

100.0% of residents lived in urban areas, while 0.0% lived in rural areas.

There were 1,307 households and 1,064 families in Naples Manor. Of the households, 50.9% had children under the age of 18 living in them. Of all households, 53.6% were married-couple households, 16.2% were households with a male householder and no spouse or partner present, and 23.4% were households with a female householder and no spouse or partner present. About 11.3% of all households were made up of individuals and 4.5% had someone living alone who was 65 years of age or older.

There were 1,452 housing units, of which 10.0% were vacant. The homeowner vacancy rate was 1.1% and the rental vacancy rate was 13.6%.

=== 2000 census ===
As of the census of 2000, there were 5,186 people, 1,140 households, and 1,016 families residing in the CDP. The population density was 7,483.0 inhabitants per square mile (2,889.2/km^{2}). There were 1,160 housing units at an average density of 1,673.8 per square mile (646.3/km^{2}). The racial makeup of the CDP was 49.48% White, 16.43% African American, 0.39% Native American, 0.13% Asian, 0.10% Pacific Islander, 29.16% from other races, and 4.32% from two or more races. Hispanic or Latino of any race were 69.30% of the population.

There were 1,140 households, out of which 55.7% had children under the age of 18 living with them, 66.1% were married couples living together, 12.5% had a female householder with no husband present, and 10.8% were non-families. 5.8% of all households were made up of individuals, and 1.3% had someone living alone who was 65 years of age or older. The average household size was 4.55 and the average family size was 4.30.

In the CDP, the population was spread out, with 33.7% under the age of 18, 15.5% from 18 to 24, 33.9% from 25 to 44, 13.2% from 45 to 64, and 3.7% who were 65 years of age or older. The median age was 25 years. For every 100 females, there were 127.2 males. For every 100 females age 18 and over, there were 140.5 males.

The median income for a household in the CDP was $41,338, and the median income for a family was $37,065. Males had a median income of $20,434 versus $19,434 for females. The per capita income for the CDP was $11,019. About 23.6% of families and 26.5% of the population were below the poverty line, including 34.7% of those under age 18 and 13.1% of those age 65 or over.
