= Island Walk, Florida =

- Census-designated place
- Location in the state of Florida
- Coordinates: 26°14′55″N 81°42′37″W
- Country: United States
- State: Florida
- County: Collier

Area
  - Total: 1.02 sq mi (2.65 km^{2})
  - Land: 1.02 sq mi (2.65 km^{2})
  - Water: 0 sq mi (0.00 km^{2})
- Elevation: 13 ft (4.0 m)

Population (2020)
  - Total: 2,812
  - Density: 2,748.4/sq mi (1,061.18/km^{2})
- Time zone: UTC-5 (Eastern (EST))
  - Summer (DST): UTC-4 (EDT)
- ZIP code: 34119
- Area code: 239
- FIPS code: 12-34185
- GNIS feature ID: 2583356

Island Walk is an unincorporated area and a census-designated place (CDP) in Collier County, Florida, United States. As of the 2020 United States census, there were 2,812 people, 1,511 households and 1,085 families residing in the CDP. The population was 3,035 at the 2010 census. It is part of the Naples–Marco Island Metropolitan Statistical Area.

== Geography ==
Island Walk is located in northwestern Collier County, 12 miles (19 km) northeast of Naples.

According to the United States Census Bureau, the CDP has a total area of 1.0 square mile (2.7 km^{2}).

There are numerous bridges across extensive interconnected ponds that surround almost every street in the community.

== Demographics ==
Historical population
Census	Pop.	Note	%±
2010	3,035		—
2020	2,812		−7.3%
U.S. Decennial Census

Island Walk first appeared as a census designated place in the 2010 U.S. census.

=== 2020 census ===
As of the 2020 census, Island Walk had a population of 2,812. The median age was 70.3 years. 5.4% of residents were under the age of 18 and 63.0% of residents were 65 years of age or older. For every 100 females there were 79.0 males, and for every 100 females age 18 and over there were 77.9 males age 18 and over.

100.0% of residents lived in urban areas, while 0.0% lived in rural areas.

There were 1,530 households in Island Walk, of which 10.0% had children under the age of 18 living in them. Of all households, 56.7% were married-couple households, 9.1% were households with a male householder and no spouse or partner present, and 30.3% were households with a female householder and no spouse or partner present. About 31.5% of all households were made up of individuals and 24.2% had someone living alone who was 65 years of age or older.

There were 1,858 housing units, of which 17.7% were vacant. The homeowner vacancy rate was 1.4% and the rental vacancy rate was 4.9%.

Island Walk racial composition (Hispanics excluded from racial categories) (NH = Non-Hispanic)
Race	Number	Percentage
White (NH)	2,509	89.22%
Black or African American (NH)	17	0.6%
Native American or Alaska Native (NH)	5	0.18%
Asian (NH)	36	1.28%
Pacific Islander (NH)	1	0.04%
Some Other Race (NH)	13	0.46%
Mixed/Multi-Racial (NH)	60	2.13%
Hispanic or Latino	171	6.08%
Total	2,812	
