= Pine Ridge, Collier County, Florida =

- Census-designated place
- Location in Collier County and the state of Florida
- Coordinates: 26°14′30″N 81°47′45″W
- Country: United States
- State: Florida
- County: Collier

Area
  - Total: 1.8 sq mi (4.7 km^{2})
  - Land: 1.7 sq mi (4.3 km^{2})
  - Water: 0.12 sq mi (0.3 km^{2})
- Elevation: 7 ft (2.1 m)

Population (2010)
  - Total: 1,918
  - Density: 1,145/sq mi (441.9/km^{2})
- Time zone: UTC-5 (Eastern (EST))
  - Summer (DST): UTC-4 (EDT)
- GNIS feature ID: 2403418

Historical population
Census	Pop.	Note	%±
2000	1,965		—
2010	1,918		−2.4%
2020	1,717		−10.5%

Pine Ridge is a census-designated place (CDP) in Collier County, Florida, United States. The population was 1,717 at the 2020 census, down from 1,918 at the 2010 census. It is part of the Naples–Marco Island Metropolitan Statistical Area.

== Geography ==
Pine Ridge is located in northwestern Collier County. It is part of the unincorporated community of North Naples and is just east of Pelican Bay and north of Naples.

According to the United States Census Bureau, the CDP has a total area of 1.8 square miles (4.7 km^{2}), of which 1.7 square miles (4.3 km^{2}) is land and 0.12 square miles (0.3 km^{2}), or 6.91%, is water.

== Demographics ==
As of the census of 2000, there were 1,965 people, 806 households, and 544 families residing in the CDP. The population density was 1,111.9 inhabitants per square mile (429.3/km^{2}). There were 957 housing units at an average density of 541.5 per square mile (209.1/km^{2}). The racial makeup of the CDP was 97.56% White, 0.97% African American, 0.15% Native American, 0.46% Asian, 0.15% Pacific Islander, 0.31% from other races, and 0.41% from two or more races. Hispanic or Latino of any race were 3.10% of the population.

There were 806 households, out of which 29.2% had children under the age of 18 living with them, 58.4% were married couples living together, 6.5% had a female householder with no husband present, and 32.5% were non-families. 27.3% of all households were made up of individuals, and 10.7% had someone living alone who was 65 years of age or older. The average household size was 2.44 and the average family size was 3.00.

In the CDP, the population was spread out, with 25.0% under the age of 18, 3.6% from 18 to 24, 22.0% from 25 to 44, 30.7% from 45 to 64, and 18.7% who were 65 years of age or older. The median age was 45 years. For every 100 females, there were 90.4 males. For every 100 females age 18 and over, there were 87.9 males.

The median income for a household in the CDP was $60,150, and the median income for a family was $78,308. Males had a median income of $52,083 versus $32,768 for females. The per capita income for the CDP was $43,362. About 1.7% of families and 1.9% of the population were below the poverty line, including 2.6% of those under age 18 and 2.5% of those age 65 or over.
