= Lely Resort, Florida =

- Census-designated place
- Location in Collier County and the state of Florida
- Coordinates: 26°05′20″N 81°42′11″W
- Country: United States
- State: Florida
- County: Collier

Area
  - Total: 5.31 sq mi (13.75 km^{2})
  - Land: 4.99 sq mi (12.92 km^{2})
  - Water: 0.32 sq mi (0.83 km^{2})
- Elevation: 7 ft (2.1 m)

Population (2020)
  - Total: 7,619
  - Density: 1,527.3/sq mi (589.68/km^{2})
- Time zone: UTC-5 (Eastern (EST))
  - Summer (DST): UTC-4 (EDT)
- FIPS code: 12-40037
- GNIS feature ID: 2403230

Lely Resort is a census-designated place (CDP) in Collier County, Florida, United States. The population was 7,619 at the 2020 census, up from 4,646 at the 2010 census. It is part of the Naples–Marco Island Metropolitan Statistical Area.

== History and development ==
Lely Resort was named after Cornelius van der Lely, a Dutch inventor. He bought around 25,000 acres of undeveloped land in 1972 with a plan to develop a community with more than 10,500 homes. Although three planned golf courses were built in 1990, 1991 and 1997, the development stalled until Stock Development purchased 340 acres in the southern half of Lely Resort in 2001.

== Geography ==
Lely Resort is located in western Collier County. It is bordered to the southwest by U.S. Route 41, to the west by Naples Manor, to the northwest by Lely, and to the east by Verona Walk. Downtown Naples is 7 miles (11 km) to the northwest.

According to the United States Census Bureau, the Lely Resort CDP has a total area of 5.3 square miles (13.7 km^{2}), of which 4.9 square miles (12.8 km^{2}) is land and 0.35 square miles (0.9 km^{2}), or 6.21%, is water.

== Demographics ==
Historical population
Census	Pop.	Note	%±
2000	1,426		—
2010	4,646		225.8%
2020	7,619		64.0%
U.S. Decennial Census

=== 2020 census ===
As of the 2020 census, Lely Resort had a population of 7,619. The median age was 61.9 years. 10.9% of residents were under the age of 18 and 44.0% of residents were 65 years of age or older. For every 100 females, there were 91.1 males, and for every 100 females age 18 and over there were 90.3 males age 18 and over.

100.0% of residents lived in urban areas, while 0.0% lived in rural areas.

There were 3,721 households in Lely Resort, of which 12.8% had children under the age of 18 living in them. Of all households, 52.5% were married-couple households, 16.2% were households with a male householder and no spouse or partner present, and 24.7% were households with a female householder and no spouse or partner present. About 27.9% of all households were made up of individuals, and 16.3% had someone living alone who was 65 years of age or older. There were 1,754 families residing in the CDP.

There were 6,215 housing units, of which 40.1% were vacant. The homeowner vacancy rate was 2.3% and the rental vacancy rate was 12.5%.

Lely Resort racial composition (Hispanics excluded from racial categories) (NH = Non-Hispanic)
Race	Number	Percentage
White (NH)	5,380	70.61%
Black or African American (NH)	821	10.78%
Native American or Alaska Native (NH)	6	0.08%
Asian (NH)	97	1.27%
Some Other Race (NH)	20	0.26%
Mixed/Multi-Racial (NH)	141	1.85%
Hispanic or Latino	1,154	15.15%
Total	7,619	

=== 2000 census ===
At the 2000 census, there were 1,426 people, 649 households and 445 families residing in the CDP. The population density was 272.9 inhabitants per square mile (105.4/km^{2}). There were 1,086 housing units at an average density of 207.8 per square mile (80.2/km^{2}). The racial makeup of the CDP was 89.27% White, 4.63% African American, 0.49% Asian, 0.14% Pacific Islander, 1.89% from other races, and 3.58% from two or more races. Hispanic or Latino of any race were 16.48% of the population.

There were 649 households, of which 19.1% had children under the age of 18 living with them, 56.1% were married couples living together, 8.3% had a female householder with no husband present, and 31.4% were non-families. 23.1% of all households were made up of individuals, and 8.3% had someone living alone who was 65 years of age or older The average household size was 2.20 and the average family size was 2.53.

16.1% of the population were under the age of 18, 10.6% from 18 to 24, 20.8% from 25 to 44, 29.1% from 45 to 64, and 23.4% who were 65 years of age or older. The median age was 48 years. For every 100 females, there were 103.4 males. For every 100 females age 18 and over, there were 99.3 males.

The median household income was $50,640 and the median family income was $57,273. Males had a median income of $31,750 and females $25,560. The per capita income was $33,536. About 2.4% of families and 6.9% of the population were below the poverty line, including none of those under age 18 and 5.3% of those age 65 or over.
