= Verona Walk, Florida =

Census-designated place in Collier County, Florida, USA

- Census-designated place
- Location in the state of Florida
- Coordinates: 26°05′10″N 81°40′47″W
- Country: United States
- State: Florida
- County: Collier

Area
  - Total: 1.26 sq mi (3.26 km^{2})
  - Land: 1.26 sq mi (3.26 km^{2})
  - Water: 0 sq mi (0.00 km^{2})
- Elevation: 10 ft (3.0 m)

Population (2020)
  - Total: 2,713
  - Density: 2,150/sq mi (832/km^{2})
- Time zone: UTC-5 (Eastern (EST))
  - Summer (DST): UTC-4 (EDT)
- ZIP code: 34114
- Area code: 239
- FIPS code: 12-74235
- GNIS feature ID: 2583385

Verona Walk is a census-designated place (CDP) in Collier County, Florida, United States. The population was 2,713 at the 2020 census, up from 1,782 at the 2010 census. It is part of the Naples–Marco Island Metropolitan Statistical Area.

== Geography ==
Verona Walk is located in western Collier County. It is bordered to the west by Lely Resort. Collier Boulevard forms the western edge of the CDP.

According to the United States Census Bureau, Verona Walk has a total area of 1.6 square miles (4.1 km^{2}), all land.

== Demographics ==
Historical population
Census	Pop.	Note	%±
2010	1,782		—
2020	2,713		52.2%
U.S. Decennial Census

Verona Walk first appeared as a census designated place in the 2010 U.S. census.

=== 2020 census ===
As of the 2020 census, Verona Walk had a population of 2,713. The median age was 68.9 years. 4.5% of residents were under the age of 18 and 62.4% were 65 years of age or older. For every 100 females, there were 86.3 males, and for every 100 females age 18 and over, there were 85.9 males age 18 and over.

99.4% of residents lived in urban areas, while 0.6% lived in rural areas.

There were 1,428 households in Verona Walk, of which 4.4% had children under the age of 18 living in them. Of all households, 65.1% were married-couple households, 9.1% were households with a male householder and no spouse or partner present, and 21.2% were households with a female householder and no spouse or partner present. About 24.9% of all households were made up of individuals and 18.7% had someone living alone who was 65 years of age or older. There were 944 families residing in the CDP.

There were 1,920 housing units, of which 25.6% were vacant. The homeowner vacancy rate was 3.2% and the rental vacancy rate was 5.9%.

Verona Walk racial composition (Hispanics excluded from racial categories) (NH = Non-Hispanic)
Race	Number	Percentage
White (NH)	2,457	90.56%
Black or African American (NH)	21	0.77%
Native American or Alaska Native (NH)	2	0.07%
Asian (NH)	22	0.81%
Some Other Race (NH)	15	0.55%
Mixed/Multi-Racial (NH)	52	1.92%
Hispanic or Latino	144	5.31%
Total	2,713	
