= Pelican Bay, Florida =

- Census-designated place
- Location in Collier County and the state of Florida
- Coordinates: 26°14′42″N 81°48′46″W
- Country: United States
- State: Florida
- County: Collier

Area
  - Total: 3.34 sq mi (8.66 km^{2})
  - Land: 2.95 sq mi (7.63 km^{2})
  - Water: 0.40 sq mi (1.03 km^{2})
- Elevation: 7 ft (2.1 m)

Population (2020)
  - Total: 6,660
  - Density: 2,260.0/sq mi (872.61/km^{2})
- Time zone: UTC-5 (Eastern (EST))
  - Summer (DST): UTC-4 (EDT)
- FIPS code: 12-55650
- GNIS feature ID: 2403404

Pelican Bay is a census-designated place (CDP) in Collier County, Florida, United States. The population was 6,660 at the 2020 census, up from 6,346 at the 2010 census. It is part of the Naples–Marco Island Metropolitan Statistical Area.

== Geography ==
Pelican Bay is located in northwestern Collier County. It is part of the area known as North Naples and is located just south of Naples Park and west of Pine Ridge. It is bordered to the south by the city of Naples, to the east by U.S. Route 41 (the Tamiami Trail), to the north by Vanderbilt Beach Road, and to the west by the Gulf of Mexico.

According to the United States Census Bureau, the CDP has a total area of 3.4 square miles (8.7 km^{2}), of which 2.9 square miles (7.6 km^{2}) is land and 0.39 square miles (1.0 km^{2}), or 11.87%, is water.

== Demographics ==
Historical population
Census	Pop.	Note	%±
2000	5,686		—
2010	6,346		11.6%
2020	6,660		4.9%
U.S. Decennial Census

=== 2020 census ===
Pelican Bay racial composition (Hispanics excluded from racial categories) (NH = Non-Hispanic)
Race	Number	Percentage
White (NH)	6,410	96.25%
Black or African American (NH)	7	0.11%
Native American or Alaska Native (NH)	3	0.05%
Asian (NH)	61	0.92%
Some Other Race (NH)	8	0.12%
Mixed/Multi-Racial (NH)	71	1.07%
Hispanic or Latino	100	1.5%
Total	6,660	

As of the 2020 census, there were 6,660 people, 3,483 households, and 2,165 families residing in the CDP.

The median age was 73.9 years. 1.8% of residents were under the age of 18 and 78.1% of residents were 65 years of age or older. For every 100 females, there were 81.7 males, and for every 100 females age 18 and over there were 81.3 males age 18 and over.

100.0% of residents lived in urban areas, while 0.0% lived in rural areas.

Of households, 2.1% had children under the age of 18 living in them. Of all households, 61.9% were married-couple households, 8.7% were households with a male householder and no spouse or partner present, and 26.9% were households with a female householder and no spouse or partner present. About 32.9% of all households were made up of individuals, and 27.8% had someone living alone who was 65 years of age or older.

There were 6,634 housing units, of which 42.8% were vacant. The homeowner vacancy rate was 1.9% and the rental vacancy rate was 15.0%.

=== 2000 census ===
As of the census of 2000, there were 5,686 people, 3,005 households, and 2,166 families residing in the CDP. The population density was 1,754.0 inhabitants per square mile (677.2/km^{2}). There were 5,738 housing units at an average density of 1,770.0 per square mile (683.4/km^{2}). The racial makeup of the CDP was 99.21% White, 0.09% African American, 0.04% Native American, 0.47% Asian, 0.07% from other races, and 0.12% from two or more races. Hispanic or Latino of any race were 0.91% of the population.

There were 3,005 households, out of which 3.5% had children under the age of 18 living with them, 70.0% were married couples living together, 1.5% had a female householder with no husband present, and 27.9% were non-families. 25.6% of all households were made up of individuals, and 16.6% had someone living alone who was 65 years of age or older. The average household size was 1.84 and the average family size was 2.12.

In the CDP, the population was spread out, with 3.4% under the age of 18, 0.7% from 18 to 24, 4.2% from 25 to 44, 33.9% from 45 to 64, and 57.8% who were 65 years of age or older. The median age was 67 years. For every 100 females, there were 84.5 males. For every 100 females age 18 and over, there were 84.0 males.

The median income for a household in the CDP was $102,762, and the median income for a family was $127,920. Males had a median income of $100,000 versus $44,286 for females. The per capita income for the CDP was $89,063. About 1.9% of families and 2.8% of the population were below the poverty line, including none of those under age 18 and 1.6% of those age 65 or over.
