= Plantation Island, Florida =

- Census-designated place
- Location in Collier County and the state of Florida
- Coordinates: 25°50′51″N 81°22′25″W
- Country: United States
- State: Florida
- County: Collier

Area
  - Total: 0.59 sq mi (1.53 km^{2})
  - Land: 0.58 sq mi (1.49 km^{2})
  - Water: 0.012 sq mi (0.03 km^{2})
- Elevation: 0 ft (0 m)

Population (2020)
  - Total: 119
  - Density: 206.6/sq mi (79.76/km^{2})
- Time zone: UTC-5 (Eastern (EST))
  - Summer (DST): UTC-4 (EDT)
- FIPS code: 12-57492
- GNIS feature ID: 2403428

Plantation Island is a census-designated place (CDP) in Collier County, Florida, United States. The population was 119 at the 2020 census, down from 163 at the 2010 census. It is part of the Naples–Marco Island Metropolitan Statistical Area.

== Geography ==
Plantation Island is located in southern Collier County along Halfway Creek upstream several thousand feet from Chokoloskee Bay. Plantation Island is near a northwest point of Everglades National Park and a southwest point of Big Cypress National Preserve. It is south of Everglades City and north of Chokoloskee via State Road 29.

According to the United States Census Bureau, the CDP has a total area of 0.58 square miles (1.5 km^{2}), of which 0.012 square miles (0.03 km^{2}), or 1.90%, is water. From the canal-lined lots on Plantation Island, it is a short boat ride down Halfway Creek, across Chokoloskee Bay, through the Ten Thousand Islands and out into the Gulf of Mexico. Plantation Island is located within the Big Cypress Area of Critical State Concern.

Plantation Island, Florida has a Tropical climate.

== Demographics ==
Historical population
Census	Pop.	Note	%±
2000	202		—
2010	163		−19.3%
2020	119		−27.0%
U.S. Decennial Census

=== 2020 census ===
Plantation Island racial composition (Hispanics excluded from racial categories) (NH = Non-Hispanic)
Race	Number	Percentage
White (NH)	104	87.39%
Native American or Alaska Native (NH)	1	0.84%
Some Other Race (NH)	1	0.84%
Mixed/Multi-Racial (NH)	5	4.2%
Hispanic or Latino	8	6.72%
Total	119	

As of the 2020 United States census, there were 119 people, 14 households, and 0 families residing in the CDP.

=== 2000 census ===
As of the census of 2000, there were 202 people, 92 households, and 57 families residing in the CDP. The population density was 344.1 inhabitants per square mile (132.9/km^{2}). There were 158 housing units at an average density of 269.2 per square mile (103.9/km^{2}). The racial makeup of the CDP was 96.53% White. Hispanic or Latino of any race were 3.47% of the population.

There were 92 households, out of which 18.5% had children under the age of 18 living with them, 54.3% were married couples living together, 3.3% had a female householder with no husband present, and 38.0% were non-families. 28.3% of all households were made up of individuals, and 9.8% had someone living alone who was 65 years of age or older. The average household size was 2.20 and the average family size was 2.65.

In the CDP, the population was spread out, with 14.4% under the age of 18, 9.4% from 18 to 24, 21.3% from 25 to 44, 32.7% from 45 to 64, and 22.3% who were 65 years of age or older. The median age was 48 years. For every 100 females, there were 104.0 males. For every 100 females age 18 and over, there were 119.0 males.

The median income for a household in the CDP was $38,750, and the median income for a family was $45,208. Males had a median income of $31,667 versus $30,833 for females. The per capita income for the CDP was $21,581. About 13.8% of families and 14.6% of the population were below the poverty line, including none of those under the age of eighteen and 11.4% of those 65 or over.
