= Collier County, Florida =

County in Florida, United States

- County
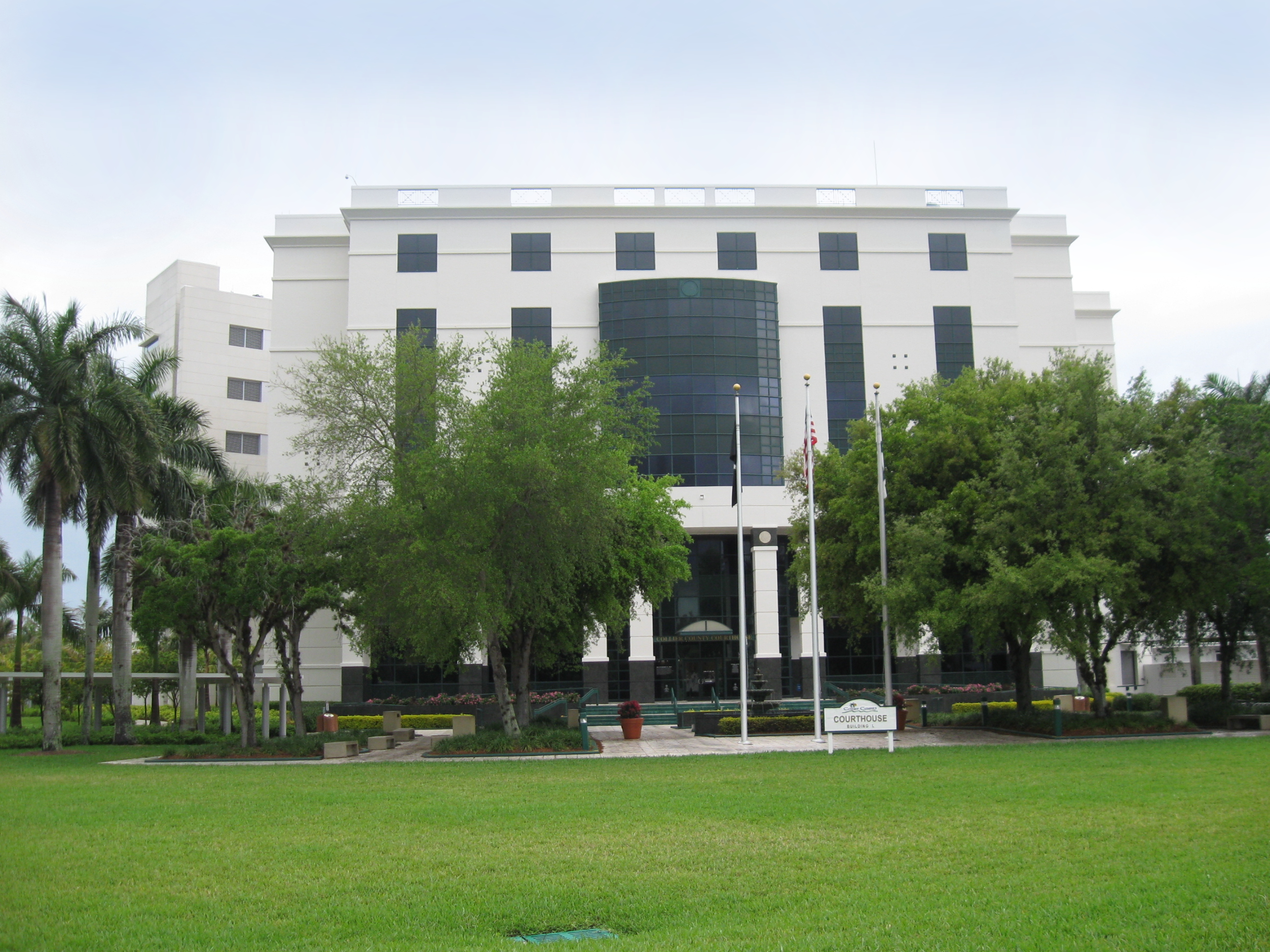
- The Collier County Courthouse in April 2010

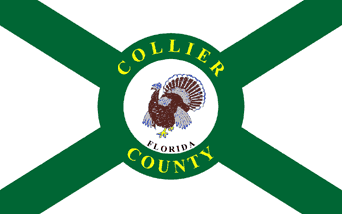
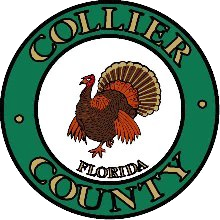
- Flag Seal Logo

- Location within the U.S. state of Florida
- Coordinates: 26°05′N 81°24′W
- Country: United States
- State: Florida
- Founded: May 8, 1923
- Named for: Barron Collier
- Seat: East Naples
- Largest city: Naples

Area
  - Total: 2,305 sq mi (5,970 km^{2})
  - Land: 1,998 sq mi (5,170 km^{2})
  - Water: 307 sq mi (800 km^{2}) 13.3%

Population (2020)
  - Total: 375,752
  - Estimate (2025): 417,131 ▲
  - Density: 208/sq mi (80/km^{2})
- Time zone: UTC−5 (Eastern)
  - Summer (DST): UTC−4 (EDT)
- Congressional districts: 18th, 19th, 26th
- Website: www.collier.gov

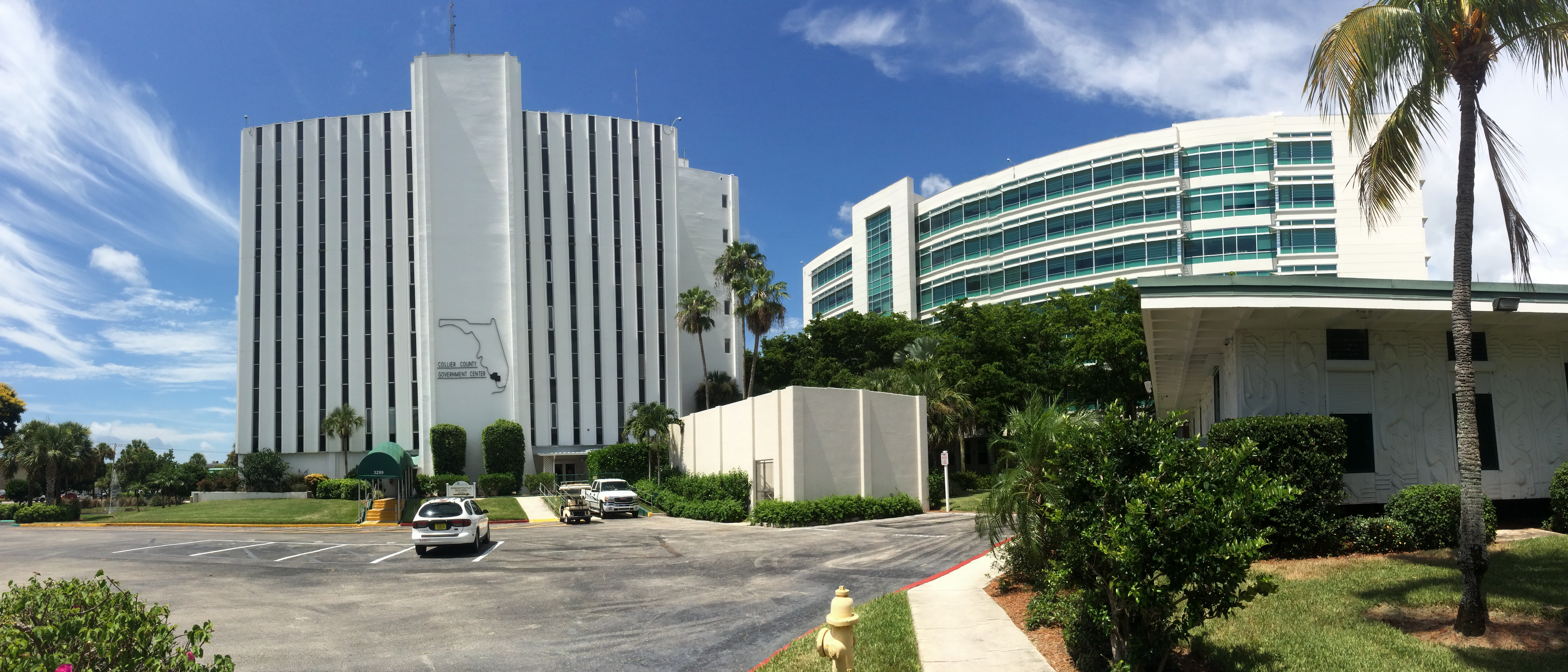
Collier County's main administration building, left, and the back end of the county courthouse, right.

Collier County is a county in the U.S. state of Florida. As of the 2020 census, its population was 375,752; an increase of 16.9% since the 2010 United States Census. Its county seat is East Naples, where the county offices were moved from Everglades City in 1962. Collier County comprises the Naples–Marco Island Metropolitan Statistical Area (MSA), which, along with the Cape Coral–Fort Myers (Lee County) MSA and the Clewiston (Hendry County, Glades County) Micropolitan Statistical Area (μSA), is included in the Cape Coral–Fort Myers–Naples Combined Statistical Area (CSA).

== History ==
Archaeology at Platt Island in the Big Cypress National Preserve shows humans settled in what is now Collier County more than 2000 years ago. The Calusa people had an extensive presence in the area when Europeans arrived.

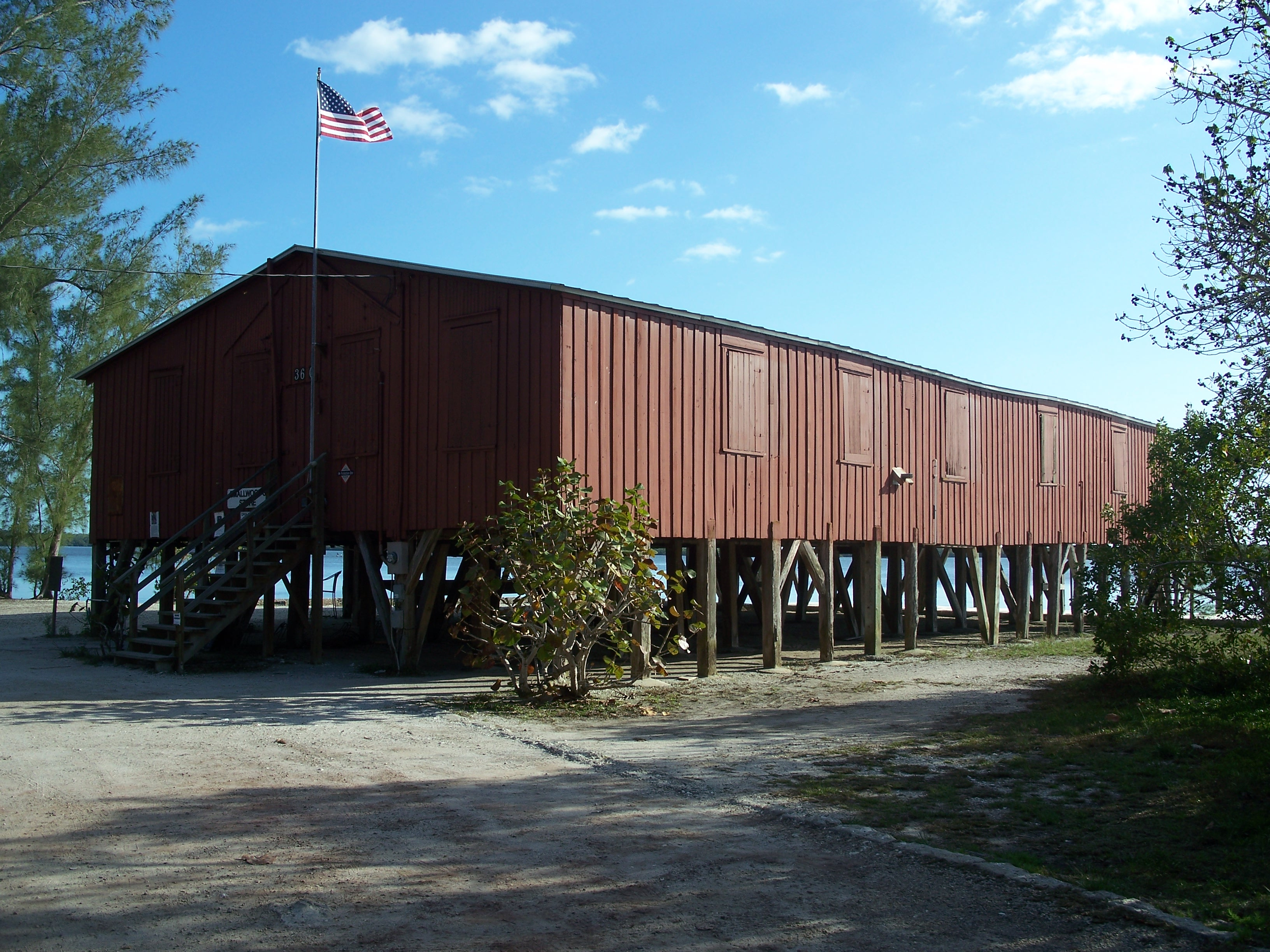
Ted Smallwood Store on Chokoloskee Island

The county was created in 1923 from Lee County. It was named for Barron Collier, a New York City advertising mogul and real estate developer who had moved to Southwest Florida and established himself as a prominent landowner. He agreed to build the Tamiami Trail for what was then Lee County (comprising today's Collier, Hendry, and Lee Counties) in exchange for favorable consideration with the state legislature to have a county named for him. After Collier County was named, Collier was quoted as saying: "When I first came here on holiday with Juliet, I never expected that I would buy a whole region of it, nor did I expect to pay for the new Tamiami Trail, or half the things I've done. But I really didn't expect to have a whole county named after me."

== Geography ==
According to the U.S. Census Bureau, the county has a total area of 2,305 square miles (5,970 km^{2}), of which 307 square miles (800 km^{2}) (13.3%) are covered by water. It is the largest county in Florida by land area and fourth-largest by total area. Virtually the entire southeastern portion of the county lies within the Big Cypress National Preserve. The northernmost portion of Everglades National Park extends into the southern coastal part of the county. Chokoloskee, Florida is in the county. The total area of this county is nearly one and a half times the size of Rhode Island, which is the smallest state, and is bigger than Rhode Island and Luxembourg combined.

=== Adjacent counties ===
Collier County is located at the southern end of Florida's Gulf Coast, and bounded by:

- Hendry County – north
- Broward County – east
- Miami-Dade County – southeast
- Monroe County – south
- Lee County – northwest

=== National protected areas ===
- Big Cypress National Preserve (part)
- Everglades National Park (part)
- Florida Panther National Wildlife Refuge
- Ten Thousand Islands National Wildlife Refuge

== Transportation ==
- Everglades Airpark
- Immokalee Airport
- Marco Island Airport
- Naples Municipal Airport
- Dade-Collier Training and Transition Airport (mostly unused)

=== Major highways ===
- Interstate 75
- U.S. Route 41
- State Road 29
- State Road 84
- State Road 951

== Demographics ==
Historical population
Census	Pop.	Note	%±
1930	2,883		—
1940	5,102		77.0%
1950	6,488		27.2%
1960	15,753		142.8%
1970	38,040		141.5%
1980	85,971		126.0%
1990	152,099		76.9%
2000	251,377		65.3%
2010	321,520		27.9%
2020	375,752		16.9%
2025 (est.)	417,131	▲	11.0%
U.S. Decennial Census; 1790–1960 1900–1990; 1990–2000 2010–2015 2020

=== 2020 census ===
As of the 2020 census, the county had a population of 375,752 and the median age was 52.9 years; 16.7% of residents were under the age of 18 and 32.6% were 65 years of age or older. For every 100 females there were 94.7 males, and for every 100 females age 18 and over there were 93.0 males; there were 97,279 families residing in the county.

The racial makeup of the county was 68.4% White, 6.2% Black or African American, 0.5% American Indian and Alaska Native, 1.5% Asian, <0.1% Native Hawaiian and Pacific Islander, 8.7% from some other race, and 14.6% from two or more races; Hispanic or Latino residents of any race comprised 27.2% of the population.

88.4% of residents lived in urban areas, while 11.6% lived in rural areas.

There were 157,921 households in the county, of which 21.5% had children under the age of 18 living in them; 54.0% were married-couple households, 15.3% were households with a male householder and no spouse or partner present, and 24.6% were households with a female householder and no spouse or partner present. About 26.4% of all households were made up of individuals and 15.9% had someone living alone who was 65 years of age or older. There were 228,390 housing units, of which 30.9% were vacant; among occupied units, 74.9% were owner-occupied and 25.1% were renter-occupied, with a homeowner vacancy rate of 2.3% and a rental vacancy rate of 11.9%.

=== Racial and ethnic composition ===
Collier County, Florida – Racial and ethnic composition Note: the US Census treats Hispanic/Latino as an ethnic category. This table excludes Latinos from the racial categories and assigns them to a separate category. Hispanics/Latinos may be of any race.
Race / ethnicity (NH = Non-Hispanic)	Pop 1980	Pop 1990	Pop 2000	Pop 2010	Pop 2020	% 1980	% 1990	% 2000	% 2010	% 2020
White alone (NH)	71,718	124,700	185,517	211,156	235,455	83.42%	81.99%	73.80%	65.67%	62.66%
Black or African American alone (NH)	4,484	5,770	10,999	19,898	22,554	5.22%	3.79%	4.38%	6.19%	6.00%
Native American or Alaska Native alone (NH)	174	353	482	609	551	0.20%	0.23%	0.19%	0.19%	0.15%
Asian alone (NH)	196	496	1,527	3,390	5,419	0.23%	0.33%	0.61%	1.05%	1.44%
Native Hawaiian or Pacific Islander alone (NH)	x	x	63	72	61	x	x	0.03%	0.02%	0.02%
Other race alone (NH)	144	46	250	431	1,502	0.17%	0.03%	0.10%	0.13%	0.40%
Mixed race or Multiracial (NH)	x	x	3,243	2,787	7,961	x	x	1.29%	0.87%	2.12%
Hispanic or Latino (any race)	9,255	20,734	49,296	83,177	102,249	10.77%	13.63%	19.61%	25.87%	27.21%
Total	85,971	152,099	251,377	321,520	375,752	100.00%	100.00%	100.00%	100.00%	100.00%

=== 2010 census ===
The county continues to experience significant growth and is becoming increasingly diverse. As of the 2010 census, the county's population had increased by 27.9% to 321,520, over the 2000 census. As of the 2010 census, 83.85% of the population was non-Hispanic Whites, 25.9% was Latino or Hispanic, 6.6% was African American, and 1.1% was Asian. As of the 2010 census, the greatest source of population growth in the county since the 2000 census came from the Latino or Hispanic population, which grew from 49,296 (19.6%) to 83,177 (25.9% ). In terms of ancestry, 37.9% were English, 9.9% were Irish, 9.1% were American, 3.2% were Italian and 3.1% were German.

=== 2000 census ===
As of the census of 2000, 251,377 people, 102,973 households, and 71,257 families resided in the county. The population density was 124 people per square mile (48 people/km^{2}). The 144,536 housing units had an average density of 71 per square mile (27/km^{2}).

As of 2000, its racial makeup was 86.06% White, 4.54% was African American, 0.29% Native American, 0.62% Asian, 6.25% from other races, and 2.23% from two or more races. Hispanics or Latinos (of any race) accounted for 19.61%. Primary languages spoken were 75.3% English, 17.8% Spanish, 2.3% French Creole, and 1.2% German.

In 2000, of the 102,973 households, 22.7% had children under 18 living with them, 58.1% were married couples living together, 7.2% had a female householder with no husband present, and 30.8% were not families. About 24.5% of all households were made up of individuals, and 11.9% had someone living alone who was 65 or older. The average household size was 2.39, and the average family size was 2.79.

The county's population distribution was 19.9% under 18, 6.6% from 18 to 24, 24.6% from 25 to 44, 24.5% from 45 to 64, and 24.5% who were 65 or older. The median age was 44.1 years, higher that the U.S. average. For every 100 females, there were 100.30 males. For every 100 females 18 and over, there were 99.20 males.

The median income for a household in the county was $48,289, and for a family was $54,816. Males had a median income of $32,639 versus $26,371 for females. The per capita income for the county was $31,195. About 6.6% of families and 10.3% of the population were below the poverty line, including 16.2% of those under age 18 and 4.3% of those age 65 or over.

A map of racial demographics in Collier County, Florida by Census tract. Legend: Non-Hispanic White 40–50% 50–60% 60–70% 70–80% 80–90% >90% Hispanic 40–50% 50–60% 70–80% 80–90% Black or African American 40–50%

== Education ==
The county's public schools are operated by the Collier County Public Schools.

== Public library ==
The Collier County Public Library system consists of 10 locations serving the entire county. All locations offer public internet stations, printing, photocopying, free Wi-Fi, and 24/7 drop boxes for book and video returns.

== Politics ==
=== Voter registration ===
According to the Secretary of State's office, Republicans comprise a majority of registered voters in Collier County. It is also one of the handful of counties where independents outnumber Democrats among registrants. The county is part of a long-established Republican stronghold in southwestern coastal Florida. It was one of the first parts of Florida to break from a "Solid South" voting pattern. The last Democrat to win the county was Adlai Stevenson II in 1952, and no Democrat has managed even 40 percent of the county's vote since Lyndon Johnson in 1964. The last Democratic gubernatorial candidate to carry the county was Reubin Askew in 1974 and the last Democratic senatorial candidate to do so was Bob Graham in 1992; six years later, the county was one of four to back Graham's Republican challenger, Charlie Crist.

All voter information is as of September 30, 2022, and provided by Collier County Supervisor of Elections Office.

1. Republican (51.4%)
2. Democratic (22.1%)
3. Other parties (26.5%)

=== Statewide elections ===
United States presidential election results for Collier County, Florida
Year	Republican		Democratic		Third party(ies)	
Year	No.	%	No.	%	No.	%
1924	15	8.33%	148	82.22%	17	9.44%
1928	151	37.01%	256	62.75%	1	0.25%
1932	37	8.03%	424	91.97%	0	0.00%
1936	88	8.89%	902	91.11%	0	0.00%
1940	156	16.17%	809	83.83%	0	0.00%
1944	180	21.95%	640	78.05%	0	0.00%
1948	247	28.07%	362	41.14%	271	30.80%
1952	1,086	49.59%	1,104	50.41%	0	0.00%
1956	1,934	59.73%	1,304	40.27%	0	0.00%
1960	2,708	60.74%	1,750	39.26%	0	0.00%
1964	3,581	55.45%	2,877	44.55%	0	0.00%
1968	5,362	50.85%	2,230	21.15%	2,952	28.00%
1972	13,501	80.63%	3,201	19.12%	42	0.25%
1976	14,643	61.76%	8,764	36.96%	303	1.28%
1980	23,900	71.10%	7,739	23.02%	1,974	5.87%
1984	33,619	78.75%	9,067	21.24%	5	0.01%
1988	38,920	74.87%	12,769	24.57%	291	0.56%
1992	38,448	53.44%	18,796	26.13%	14,700	20.43%
1996	42,593	58.74%	23,185	31.97%	6,739	9.29%
2000	60,467	65.58%	29,939	32.47%	1,796	1.95%
2004	83,631	64.99%	43,892	34.11%	1,160	0.90%
2008	86,379	60.84%	54,450	38.35%	1,159	0.82%
2012	96,520	64.64%	51,698	34.62%	1,106	0.74%
2016	105,423	61.11%	61,085	35.41%	6,002	3.48%
2020	128,950	61.91%	77,621	37.27%	1,714	0.82%
2024	143,267	65.89%	71,720	32.98%	2,447	1.13%

United States Senate election results for Collier County, Florida1
Year	Republican		Democratic		Third party(ies)	
Year	No.	%	No.	%	No.	%
2024	150,015	69.59%	63,988	29.68%	1,580	0.73%

United States Senate election results for Collier County, Florida3
Year	Republican		Democratic		Third party(ies)	
Year	No.	%	No.	%	No.	%
2022	116,050	71.33%	46,537	28.60%	102	0.06%

Florida Gubernatorial election results for Collier County
Year	Republican		Democratic		Third party(ies)	
Year	No.	%	No.	%	No.	%
1994	36,370	61.40%	22,860	38.60%	0	0.00%
1998	41,688	71.06%	16,981	28.94%	1	0.00%
2002	61,555	73.74%	21,237	25.44%	687	0.82%
2006	59,821	68.80%	25,303	29.10%	1,822	2.10%
2010	66,960	65.12%	33,408	32.49%	2,465	2.40%
2014	75,337	66.31%	35,281	31.05%	3,002	2.64%
2018	100,303	64.52%	53,594	34.48%	1,556	1.00%
2022	117,477	71.74%	45,815	27.98%	467	0.29%

== Communities ==
=== Cities ===
- Everglades City
- Marco Island
- Naples

=== Census-designated places ===
- Ave Maria
- Berkshire Lakes
- Chokoloskee
- Golden Gate
- Goodland
- Heritage Bay
- Immokalee
- Island Walk
- Lely
- Lely Resort
- Marco Shores-Hammock Bay
- Naples Manor
- Naples Park
- Orangetree
- Pelican Bay
- Pelican Marsh
- Pine Ridge
- Plantation Island
- Verona Walk
- Vineyards
- Winding Cypress

=== Community development districts ===
- Fiddler's Creek District #1
- Fiddler's Creek District #2

=== Other unincorporated communities ===
- Carnestown
- Copeland
- East Naples
- Isles of Capri
- Jerome
- Miles City
- North Naples
- Ochopee
- Vanderbilt Beach
- Vanderbilt Beach Estates

== Invasive snake issues ==
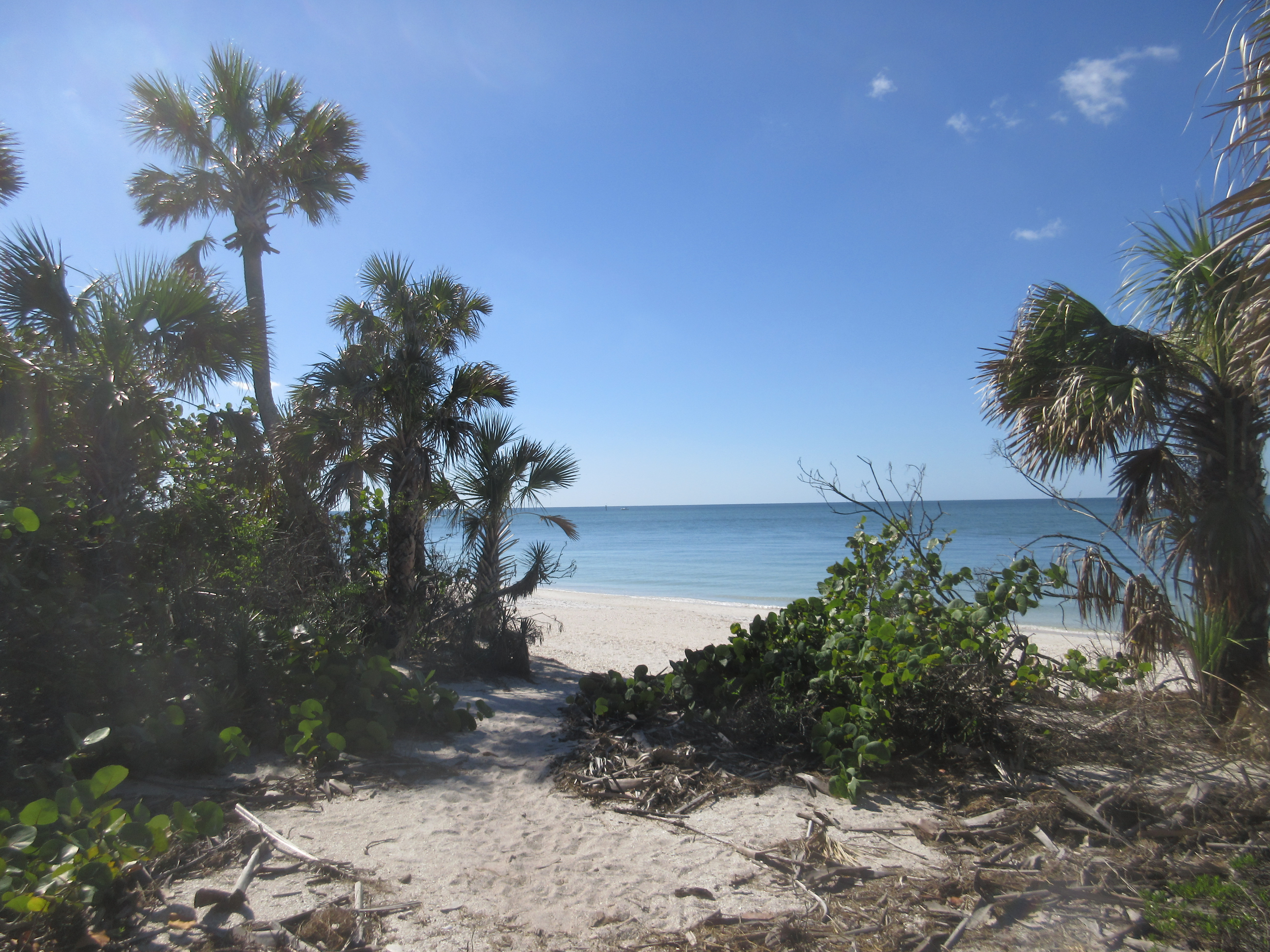
Barefoot Beach Preserve, a Collier County park

Collier is located in the center of Florida's invasive snake epidemic. A three-month effort at the beginning of 2016 netted over one ton of captured snakes, including a Florida record for the largest male Burmese python, measuring 16 ft and weighing 140 lb.

== See also ==
- Keewaydin Club
- National Register of Historic Places listings in Collier County, Florida
- Old Collier County Courthouse
