= Vineyards, Florida =

- Census-designated place
- Location in Collier County and the state of Florida
- Coordinates: 26°13′40″N 81°43′41″W
- Country: United States
- State: Florida
- County: Collier

Area
  - Total: 2.26 sq mi (5.86 km^{2})
  - Land: 1.96 sq mi (5.07 km^{2})
  - Water: 0.31 sq mi (0.80 km^{2})
- Elevation: 16 ft (4.9 m)

Population (2020)
  - Total: 3,883
  - Density: 1,984.9/sq mi (766.37/km^{2})
- Time zone: UTC-5 (Eastern (EST))
  - Summer (DST): UTC-4 (EDT)
- FIPS code: 12-74562
- GNIS feature ID: 2402971

Vineyards is a census-designated place (CDP) in Collier County, Florida, United States. The population was 3,883 at the 2020 census, up from 3,375 at the 2010 census. It is part of the Naples–Marco Island Metropolitan Statistical Area.

== Geography ==
Vineyards is located in northwest Collier County, bordered to the west by Interstate 75, with access from Exit 107, and is located about 10 miles (16 km) northeast of downtown Naples.

According to the United States Census Bureau, the CDP has a total area of 2.3 square miles (5.9 km^{2}), of which 2.0 square miles (5.1 km^{2}) is land and 0.31 square miles (0.8 km^{2}), or 13.61%, is water.

== Demographics ==
Historical population
Census	Pop.	Note	%±
2000	2,232		—
2010	3,375		51.2%
2020	3,883		15.1%
U.S. Decennial Census

=== 2020 census ===
As of the 2020 census, Vineyards had a population of 3,883. The median age was 69.8 years. 5.6% of residents were under the age of 18 and 62.1% were 65 years of age or older. For every 100 females, there were 86.5 males, and for every 100 females age 18 and over, there were 85.4 males.

100.0% of residents lived in urban areas, while 0.0% lived in rural areas.

There were 2,008 households, of which 7.6% had children under the age of 18 living in them, and there were 1,295 families. Of all households, 60.4% were married-couple households, 10.9% were households with a male householder and no spouse or partner present, and 24.7% were households with a female householder and no spouse or partner present. About 28.6% of all households were made up of individuals, and 21.5% had someone living alone who was 65 years of age or older.

There were 2,797 housing units, of which 28.2% were vacant. The homeowner vacancy rate was 1.7%, and the rental vacancy rate was 8.7%.

Vineyards racial composition (Hispanics excluded from racial categories) (NH = Non-Hispanic)
Race	Number	Percentage
White (NH)	3,519	90.63%
Black or African American (NH)	48	1.24%
Asian (NH)	54	1.39%
Some Other Race (NH)	5	0.13%
Mixed/Multi-Racial (NH)	67	1.73%
Hispanic or Latino	190	4.89%
Total	3,883	

=== 2000 census ===
As of the 2000 census, there were 2,232 people, 1,023 households, and 804 families residing in the CDP. The population density was 987.1 inhabitants per square mile (381.1/km^{2}). There were 1,543 housing units at an average density of 682.4 per square mile (263.5/km^{2}). The racial makeup of the CDP was 97.98% White, 0.76% African American, 0.04% Native American, 0.40% Asian, 0.49% from other races, and 0.31% from two or more races. Hispanic or Latino of any race were 2.46% of the population.

There were 1,023 households, out of which 13.8% had children under the age of 18 living with them, 74.9% were married couples living together, 2.9% had a female householder with no husband present, and 21.4% were non-families. 18.9% of all households were made up of individuals, and 9.6% had someone living alone who was 65 years of age or older. The average household size was 2.13 and the average family size was 2.40.

In the CDP, the population was spread out, with 12.8% under the age of 18, 1.3% from 18 to 24, 11.2% from 25 to 44, 34.7% from 45 to 64, and 39.9% who were 65 years of age or older. The median age was 61 years. For every 100 females, there were 88.4 males. For every 100 females age 18 and over, there were 87.9 males.

=== Income and poverty ===
The median income for a household in the CDP was $71,597 in 2016. Males had a median income of $46,151 versus $28,964 for females.
