= Naples, Florida =

- City
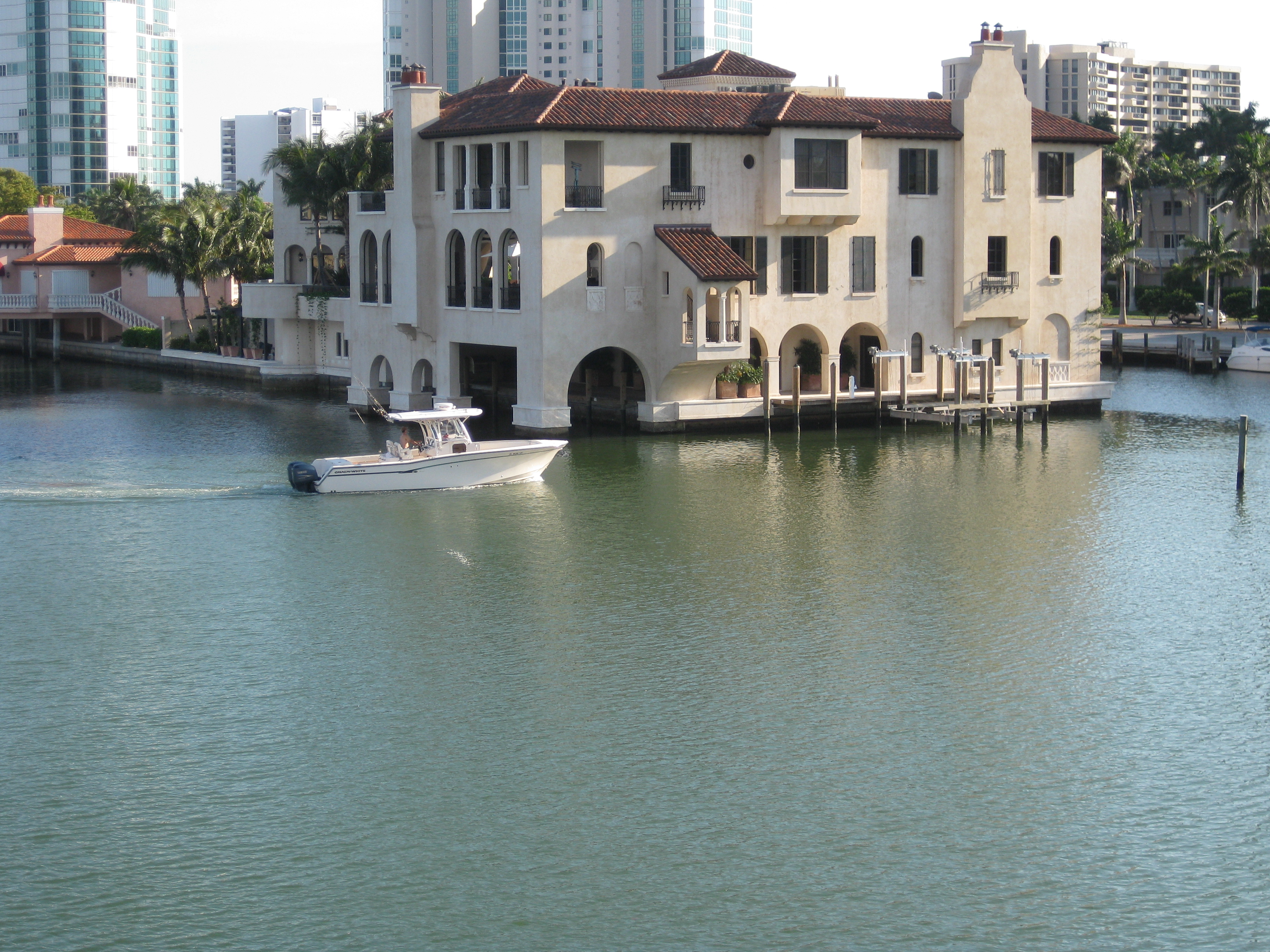
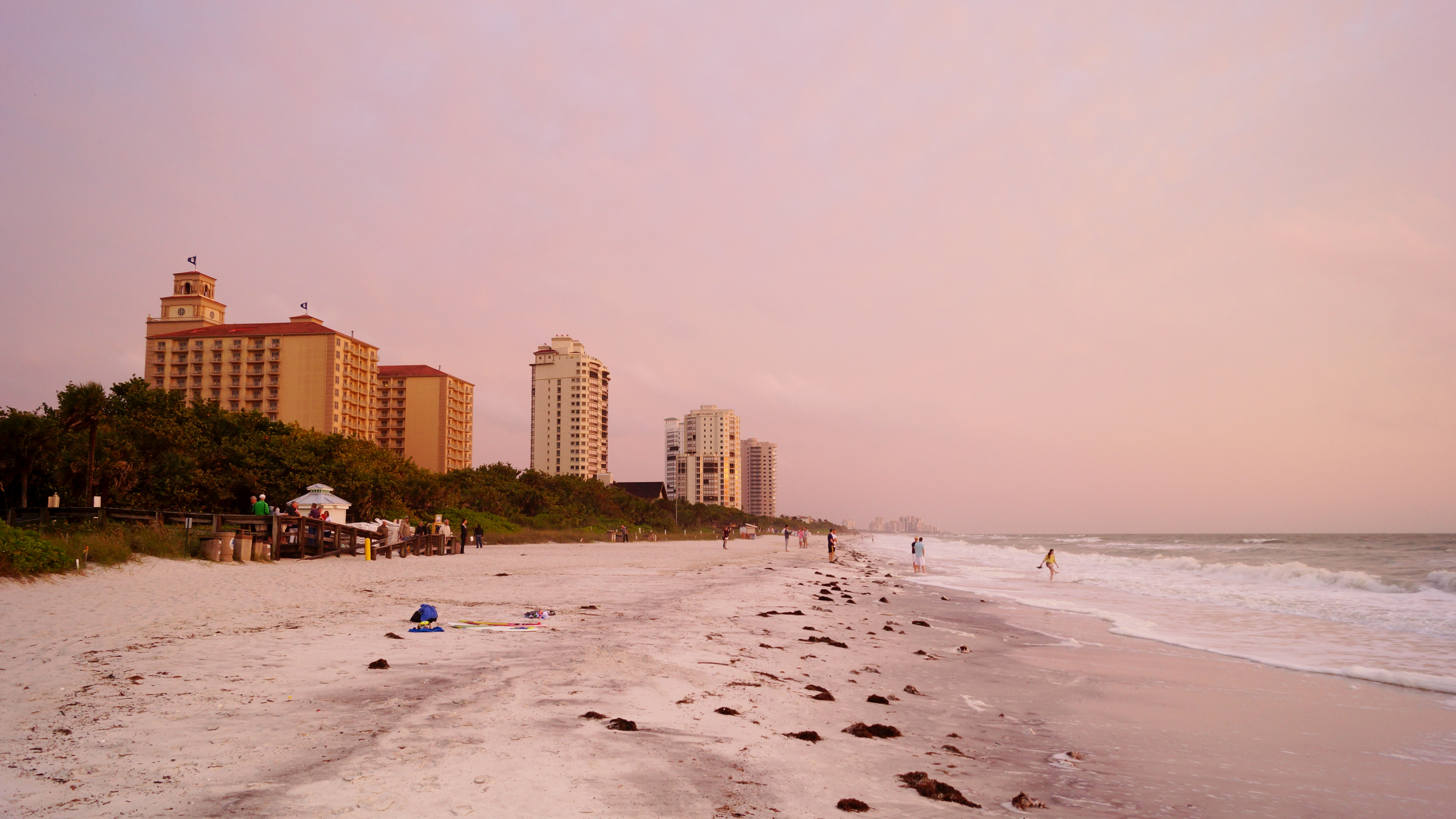
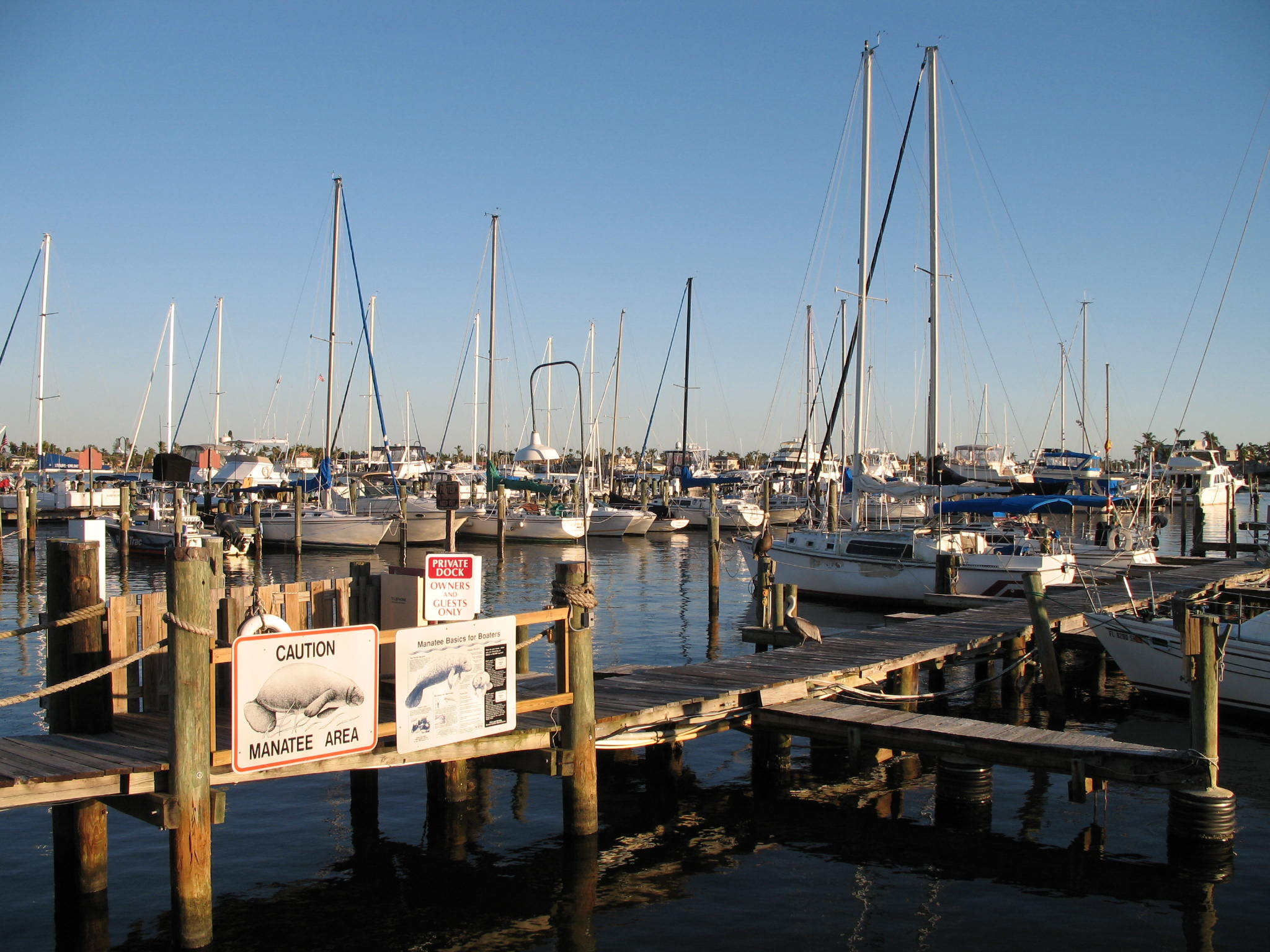
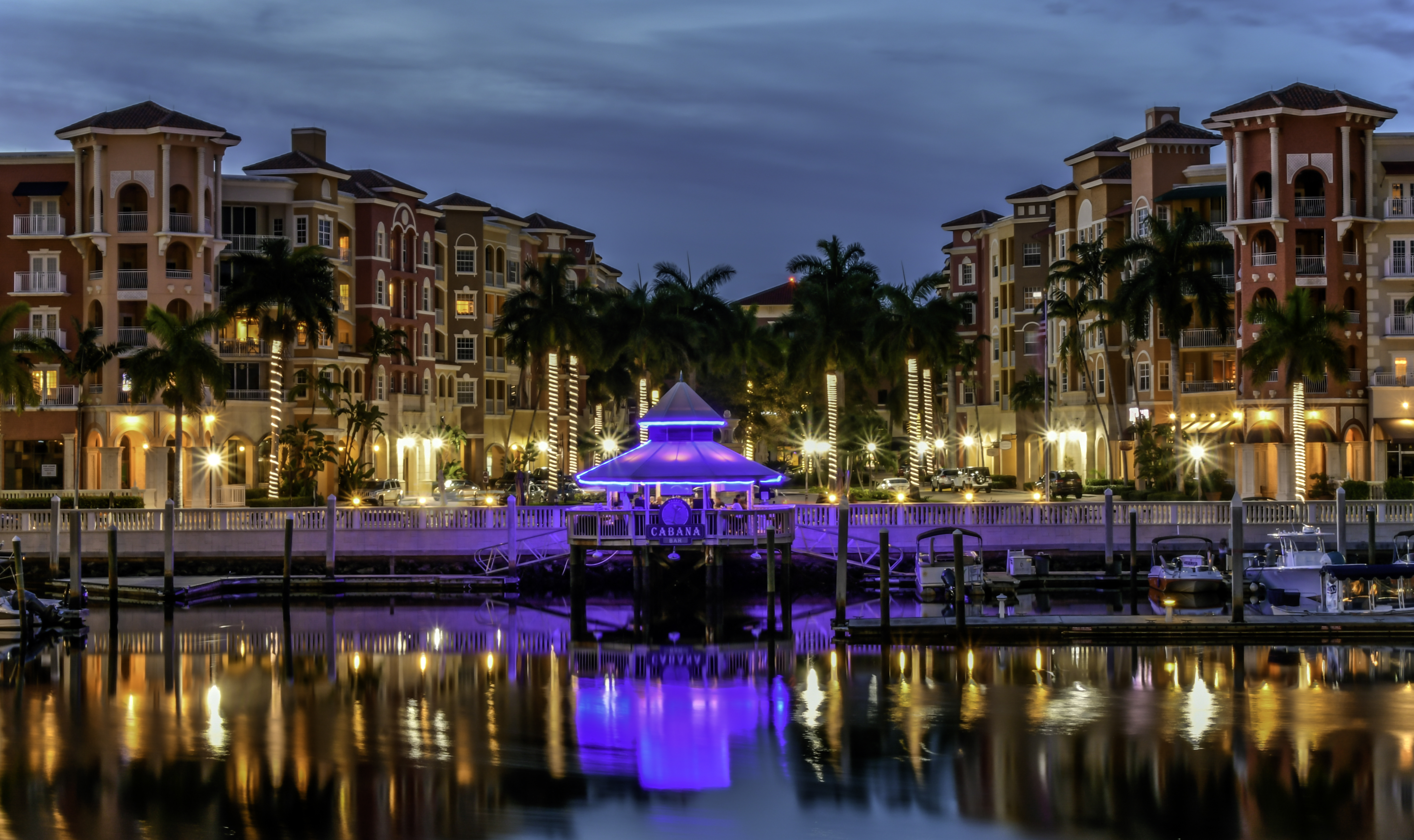
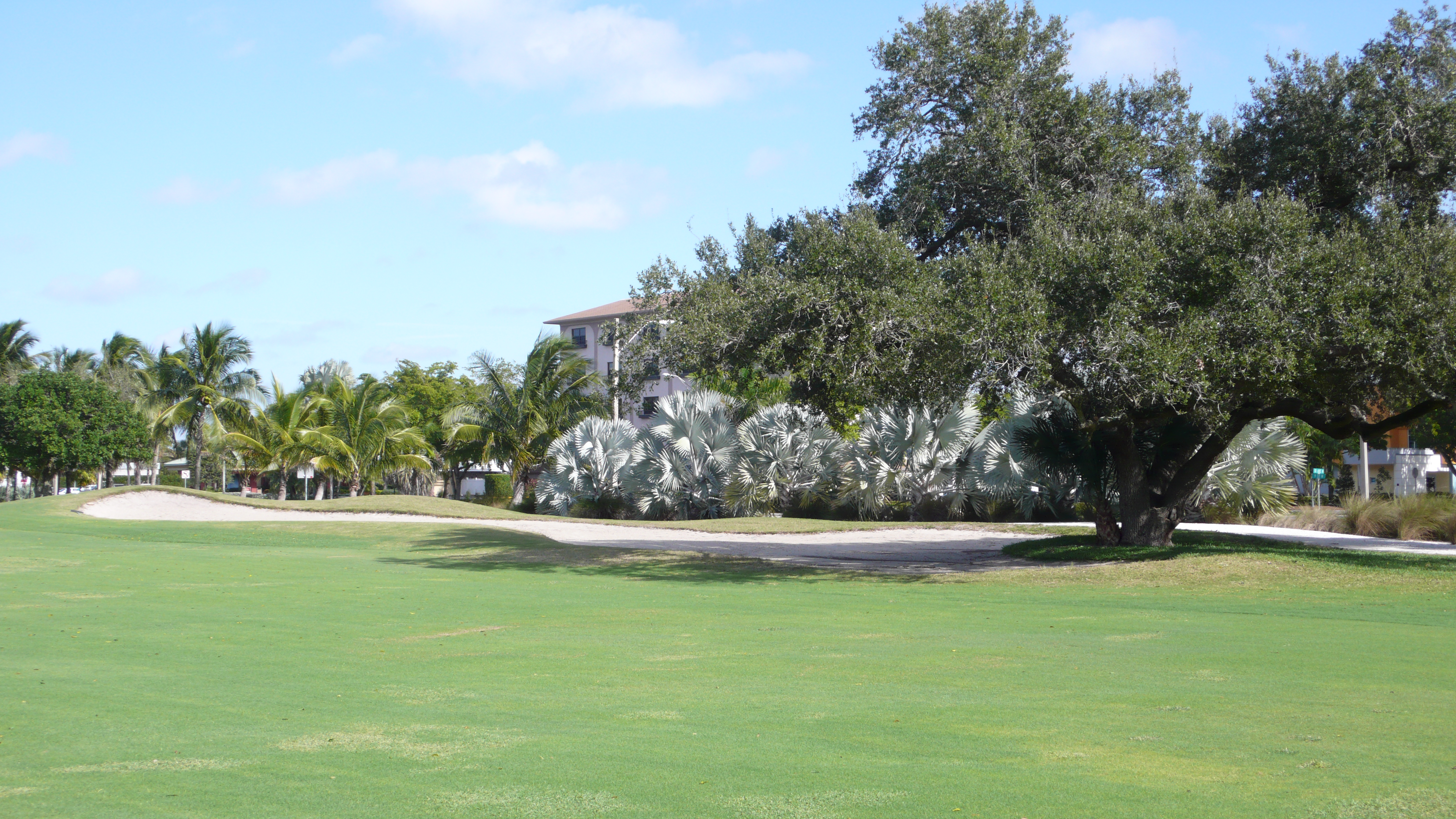
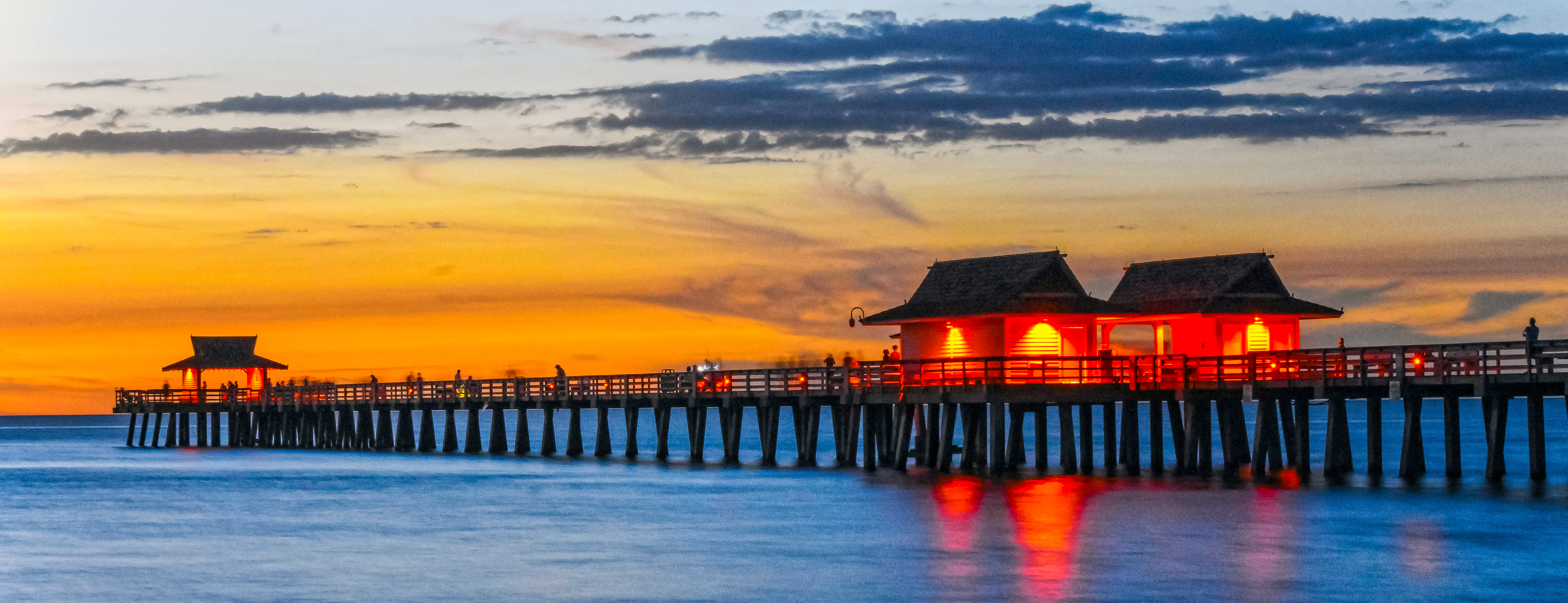
- Bayside, in front of downtown Beachside City Dock Naples Bay Beach Hotel & Golf Club Naples Pier at sundown

- Seal Logo
- Nickname: Naples on the Gulf
- Location in Collier County and the state of Florida
- Coordinates: 26°08′10″N 81°47′40″W
- Country: United States
- State: Florida
- County: Collier
- Settled: November 6, 1886
- Incorporated (town): December 1, 1923
- Incorporated (city): May 25, 1949
- Named for: Naples

Government
  - Type: Council-manager
  - Mayor: Teresa Heitmann (Term ends in March 2028)

Area
  - City: 16.46 sq mi (42.64 km^{2})
  - Land: 12.31 sq mi (31.87 km^{2})
  - Water: 4.16 sq mi (10.77 km^{2}) 25.09%
- Elevation: 7 ft (2.1 m)

Population (2025)
  - City: 20,114
  - Density: 1,553.56/sq mi (599.83/km^{2})
  - Metro: 322,000 (Estimation)
  - Demonym: Neapolitan
- Time zone: UTC−05:00 (Eastern (EST))
  - Summer (DST): UTC−04:00 (EDT)
- ZIP codes: 34101-34120
- Area code: 239
- FIPS code: 12-47625
- GNIS feature ID: 2404348
- Website: www.naplesgov.com

Naples is a city in Collier County, Florida, United States. As of the 2020 census, the population was 19,115, down from 19,539 at the 2010 census. Naples is a principal city of the Naples–Marco Island metropolitan area, which had a population of about 375,752 as of 2020.

Naples is the self-titled "Golf Capital of the World" with the second-most golf holes per capita and the most holes of any city in Florida. The city is also known for being appealing to retirees, who make up a large percentage of the population.

== History ==
Before the period of European colonization, the indigenous Calusa lived in Florida (including the region of present-day Naples) for thousands of years, from Charlotte Harbor to Cape Sable. In 1513, Spanish conquistador Juan Ponce de León explored the region and encountered the Calusa, who resisted the first Spanish attempts to establish a colony in Florida. However, decades later, Florida was finally incorporated into the Spanish Empire. In the early 18th century, following slave raids from Muscogee and Yamasee raiders allied with European settlers in Carolina, the majority of the remaining Calusa moved south and east to escape the raids.

The city of Naples was founded in 1886 by former Confederate general and Kentucky U.S. Senator John Stuart Williams and his partner, Louisville businessman Walter N. Haldeman, the publisher of the Louisville Courier-Journal. Throughout the 1870s and 1880s, magazines and newspapers ran stories about the area's mild climate and abundant fish and likened it to the sunny Italian Peninsula. The name Naples caught on when promoters described the bay as "surpassing the bay in Naples, Italy". With a population of approximately 80 in 1888, Naples saw the opening of its pier that year and welcomed its first hotel the following year. Major development was anticipated after Collier County was established in 1923, the completion of the Seaboard Air Line Railroad extension in 1927, and the completion of the Tamiami Trail linking Naples to Miami in 1928, but did not begin until after the 1929 Stock market crash, the Great Depression, and World War II. During the war the U.S. Army Air Forces built a small airfield and used it for training purposes; it is now the Naples Municipal Airport.

In 1938, John Glenn Sample, a pioneer in radio advertising from Chicago, came to Naples. He had read about the fame and fortune of Palm Beach; however, he decided to look elsewhere and discovered the relaxed atmosphere that Naples had to offer on the Gulf of Mexico and soon began buying property on the south end of Naples below 5th Avenue and along Naples Bay, which consisted mostly of marshland.

In 1949, Naples officially became a city, and the Bank of Naples, the city's first banking service, opened on 5th Avenue. In the early 50's, Sample began dredging to create numerous peninsulas and canals with lots overlooking the Naples Bay. He nicknamed the project "Port Royal", which was conceived after the 17th century Jamaican city of Port Royal. The neighborhood's streets are all named in pirate tradition, examples being names like Gin Lane, Rum Row, Treasure Lane, and Galleon Drive. Works to pave streets in the neighborhood were completed in the late 1970s.

In March 1956, the first modern medical facility was opened in Naples with the name Naples Community Hospital. In the 1960s the historic Cove Inn on Naples Bay was built, as well as the Collier County Public Library, and Cambier Park on 8th Avenue.

In May 1971 passenger train service to the city was discontinued by Amtrak; the station is now called Naples Depot Museum, and was placed on the National Register of Historic Places three years later.

Sample's dredging project with Port Royal also spurred developments in the 60s and 70s like Aqualane Shores, Park Shore, and Moorings, all affluent neighborhoods in Naples with large, waterfront homes that have boat access. In 1977, the city's first mall, the Coastland Center, was opened.

== Geography ==
Naples is located in southwest Florida on U.S. Highway 41 between Miami to the east and Fort Myers to the north.

According to the United States Census Bureau, the city has a total area of 16.4 square miles (42.5 km^{2}), of which 12.3 square miles (31.9 km^{2}) is land and 4.1 square miles (10.7 km^{2}), or 25.09%, is water.

=== Hurricanes ===
National Weather Service records that date back to 1851, indicate 74 tropical storms have passed within 85 nautical miles (157 km; 98 mi) of Naples, or once every 2.2 years (as of a 2014 data).

2005 Hurricane Wilma (Category 5) – Wilma reached maximum wind strength of 185 miles per hour (298 km/h), but its winds were 125 miles per hour (201 km/h) when it made landfall near Cape Romano (below Naples, just beyond the southwestern tip of Marco Island and northwest of the Ten Thousand Islands in Collier County). Wilma caused 87 deaths and $22.4 billion in damage.

2017 Hurricane Irma (Category 5) – Irma had maximum wind strength of 180 miles per hour (290 km/h), but when it made landfall near Marco Island, its winds were 115 miles per hour (185 km/h). As Irma hit Florida, tropical-storm-force winds extended out to 400 miles (640 km) from the center and hurricane-force winds extended up to 80 miles (130 km). This storm left over 7.5 million homes (70% of the state) without electricity for days. Irma caused 134 deaths and $50 billion in damage.

2022 Hurricane Ian (Category 5) – Ian had a maximum wind strength of 160 miles per hour (260 km/h) while approaching Florida, and it made landfall at Cayo Costa slightly below peak strength as a Category 4 hurricane with sustained winds of 150 miles per hour (240 km/h). Power was lost to much of the Naples area including Pelican Bay and Bay Colony for several days, but repairs allowed power to be turned back on, beginning on October 1, 2022. Ian caused 149 deaths in the state of Florida and an estimated $989 million in damages to the city of Naples and approximately $2.2 billion in damages to buildings in Collier County.

2024 Hurricane Milton (Category 5) – Milton had a maximum wind strength of 180 miles per hour (285 km/h) just north of the Yucatan Peninsula and made landfall near Siesta Key as a Category 3 hurricane with winds of 120 miles per hour (193 km/h). Much of the Naples area including Grey Oaks and Estuary lost electricity for a number of days, but power was restored beginning on October 16, 2024. Milton caused 35 deaths and $34.3 billion in damage.

=== Climate ===
According to the Köppen climate classification, Naples has a tropical savanna climate (Aw). Naples is normally frost-free and the growing season is 365 days. Like much of central and southern Florida there are two basic seasons in Naples; From May through October there is a hot and wet season in Naples, when hot temperatures (average high temperature is 92 °F or 33.3 °C) and frequent thundershowers are common. From November through April, is the dry season, when sunshine, dry weather, and milder temperatures with daily highs around 74 °F or 23.3 °C. Naples is in USDA hardiness zone 10b.

Climate data for Naples, Florida (Naples Airport), 1991–2020 normals, extremes 1942–present
| Month | Jan | Feb | Mar | Apr | May | Jun | Jul | Aug | Sep | Oct | Nov | Dec | Year |
|---|---|---|---|---|---|---|---|---|---|---|---|---|---|
| Record high °F (°C) | 89 (32) | 89 (32) | 91 (33) | 95 (35) | 96 (36) | 98 (37) | 98 (37) | 98 (37) | 99 (37) | 96 (36) | 92 (33) | 89 (32) | 99 (37) |
| Mean maximum °F (°C) | 84.6 (29.2) | 85.4 (29.7) | 87.4 (30.8) | 90.3 (32.4) | 92.9 (33.8) | 94.7 (34.8) | 95.3 (35.2) | 95.3 (35.2) | 94.3 (34.6) | 92.3 (33.5) | 88.5 (31.4) | 85.9 (29.9) | 96.1 (35.6) |
| Mean daily maximum °F (°C) | 74.8 (23.8) | 77.2 (25.1) | 79.7 (26.5) | 83.8 (28.8) | 87.5 (30.8) | 89.8 (32.1) | 90.8 (32.7) | 90.9 (32.7) | 89.6 (32.0) | 86.5 (30.3) | 81.3 (27.4) | 77.3 (25.2) | 84.1 (28.9) |
| Daily mean °F (°C) | 65.3 (18.5) | 67.5 (19.7) | 70.3 (21.3) | 74.6 (23.7) | 78.8 (26.0) | 82.1 (27.8) | 83.1 (28.4) | 83.3 (28.5) | 82.4 (28.0) | 78.5 (25.8) | 72.4 (22.4) | 68.2 (20.1) | 75.5 (24.2) |
| Mean daily minimum °F (°C) | 55.9 (13.3) | 57.9 (14.4) | 60.9 (16.1) | 65.5 (18.6) | 70.2 (21.2) | 74.4 (23.6) | 75.5 (24.2) | 75.8 (24.3) | 75.1 (23.9) | 70.5 (21.4) | 63.4 (17.4) | 59.0 (15.0) | 67.0 (19.4) |
| Mean minimum °F (°C) | 37.4 (3.0) | 40.6 (4.8) | 45.1 (7.3) | 51.3 (10.7) | 60.2 (15.7) | 68.1 (20.1) | 70.1 (21.2) | 71.0 (21.7) | 69.2 (20.7) | 57.7 (14.3) | 49.0 (9.4) | 41.8 (5.4) | 35.4 (1.9) |
| Record low °F (°C) | 26 (−3) | 28 (−2) | 33 (1) | 39 (4) | 51 (11) | 59 (15) | 65 (18) | 67 (19) | 65 (18) | 46 (8) | 31 (−1) | 27 (−3) | 26 (−3) |
| Average precipitation inches (mm) | 1.68 (43) | 1.40 (36) | 1.88 (48) | 2.52 (64) | 2.76 (70) | 7.41 (188) | 7.77 (197) | 8.89 (226) | 8.60 (218) | 3.93 (100) | 1.39 (35) | 1.32 (34) | 49.55 (1,259) |
| Average precipitation days (≥ 0.01 in) | 4.7 | 4.2 | 4.4 | 5.5 | 7.9 | 14.7 | 16.1 | 18.7 | 15.5 | 6.4 | 3.9 | 4.5 | 106.5 |
Source: NOAA

== Demographics ==
Historical population
| Census | Pop. | Note | %± |
|---|---|---|---|
| 1930 | 391 | | — |
| 1940 | 1,253 | | 220.5% |
| 1950 | 1,465 | | 16.9% |
| 1960 | 4,656 | | 217.8% |
| 1970 | 12,042 | | 158.6% |
| 1980 | 17,581 | | 46.0% |
| 1990 | 19,508 | | 11.0% |
| 2000 | 20,981 | | 7.6% |
| 2010 | 19,539 | | −6.9% |
| 2020 | 19,115 | | −2.2% |
U.S. Decennial Census

=== Racial and ethnic composition ===
Naples racial composition (Hispanics excluded from racial categories) (NH = Non-Hispanic)
| Race | Pop 2010 | Pop 2020 | % 2010 | % 2020 |
|---|---|---|---|---|
| White (NH) | 17,566 | 17,087 | 89.91% | 89.39% |
| Black or African American (NH) | 779 | 495 | 3.99% | 2.59% |
| Native American or Alaska Native (NH) | 22 | 17 | 0.11% | 0.09% |
| Asian (NH) | 118 | 190 | 0.60% | 0.99% |
| Pacific Islander or Native Hawaiian (NH) | 3 | 2 | 0.02% | 0.01% |
| Some other race (NH) | 13 | 75 | 0.07% | 0.39% |
| Two or more races/Multiracial (NH) | 155 | 299 | 0.79% | 1.56% |
| Hispanic or Latino (any race) | 881 | 950 | 4.51% | 4.97% |
| Total | 19,537 | 19,115 | | |

=== 2020 census ===
As of the 2020 census, Naples had a population of 19,115. The median age was 67.0 years. 7.4% of residents were under the age of 18 and 54.9% of residents were 65 years of age or older. For every 100 females there were 88.9 males, and for every 100 females age 18 and over there were 87.8 males age 18 and over.

100.0% of residents lived in urban areas, while 0.0% lived in rural areas.

There were 9,823 households in Naples, of which 8.8% had children under the age of 18 living in them. Of all households, 54.8% were married-couple households, 14.9% were households with a male householder and no spouse or partner present, and 26.3% were households with a female householder and no spouse or partner present. About 33.9% of all households were made up of individuals and 23.8% had someone living alone who was 65 years of age or older.

There were 18,225 housing units, of which 46.1% were vacant. The homeowner vacancy rate was 3.3% and the rental vacancy rate was 15.7%.

Racial composition as of the 2020 census
| Race | Number | Percent |
|---|---|---|
| White | 17,295 | 90.5% |
| Black or African American | 509 | 2.7% |
| American Indian and Alaska Native | 33 | 0.2% |
| Asian | 197 | 1.0% |
| Native Hawaiian and Other Pacific Islander | 2 | 0.0% |
| Some other race | 269 | 1.4% |
| Two or more races | 810 | 4.2% |
| Hispanic or Latino (of any race) | 950 | 5.0% |

=== 2010 census ===
As of the 2010 United States census, there were 19,537 people, 9,991 households, and 6,041 families residing in the city.

In 2010, the largest self-identified ancestry and ethnic groups in Naples were German-American 20.0%, English-American 19.2%, Irish-American 17.8%, and Italian-American 9.2%.

=== 2000 census ===
As of the census of 2000, there were 20,981 people, 10,803 households, and 6,568 families residing in the city. The population density was 1,744.3 inhabitants per square mile (673.5/km^{2}). There were 16,957 housing units at an average density of 1,410.0 units per square mile (544.4 units/km^{2}). The racial makeup of the city is 92.50% White, 4.65% African American, 0.12% Native American, 0.33% Asian, 0.02% Pacific Islander, 0.30% from other races, and 2.07% from two or more races. 2.23% of the population were Hispanic or Latino of any race.

In 2000, there were 10,803 households, out of which 10.9% had children under the age of 18 living with them, 53.8% were married couples living together, 5.0% had a female householder with no husband present, and 39.2% were non-families. 34.0% of all households were made up of individuals, and 20.1% had someone living alone who was 65 years of age or older. The average household size was 1.92 and the average family size was 2.38.

In 2000, 10.9% of the population was under the age of 18, 2.3% was from 18 to 24, 14.5% from 25 to 44, 30.0% from 45 to 64, and 42.3% was 65 years of age or older. The median age was 61 years. For every 100 females, there were 86.0 males. For every 100 females aged 18 and over, there were 83.9 males.

In 2000, the median income for a household in the city is $65,641, and the median income for a family is $83,831. Males have a median income of $50,092 versus $30,948 for females. The per capita income for the city is $61,141. 5.9% of the population and 3.1% of families are below the poverty line. Out of the total population, 15.1% of those under the age of 18 and 3.3% of those 65 and older are living below the poverty line.

== Economy ==
The economy of Naples is based largely on tourism and was historically based on real estate development and agriculture. Due to its proximity to the Everglades and Ten Thousand Islands, Naples is also popular among ecotourists.

Companies based in Naples include Beasley Broadcast Group and ASG Technologies in addition to numerous small businesses. Due to the wealth present in Collier County, Naples is also home to many small non-profit organizations. The surrounding Naples metro area is also home to major private employers such as Fortune 1000 company Health Management Associates and technology company NewsBank.

In 2009, Naples was placed 10th in a report by U.S. News & World Report titled "10 Pricey Cities That Pay Off." The report ranked cities by its "amenity value", a measurement based on the amount of satisfaction an asset brings to its owner. In 2012, a report by Kiplinger ranked Naples with the sixth-highest per capita income in the country, along with the second-highest proportion of millionaires per capita in the US.

== Arts and culture ==
=== Attractions ===
The Naples Zoo at Caribbean Gardens was founded in 1919. It started as a garden but officially became a zoo in September 1969.

Downtown Naples is home to The Naples Players, the 5th Avenue South, and 3rd Street South shopping districts, which feature a variety of antique luxury shops and fine dining restaurants. Gallery Row is a concentration among the numerous art galleries spread throughout the downtown area. Near downtown Naples Bay and the Gordon River is the shopping district of Tin City. This open-air shopping center specializes in antiques and handmade local novelties, as well as several seafood restaurants.

The Naples Half Marathon is a half marathon held every year in Naples since 1989, with record participation in 2013 of 2,038 runners.

In 2019, Baker Park, a $15 million park close to the intersection of 5th Avenue and Goodlette-Frank Road, was opened. The park also includes the Gordon River Greenway, which links to the Naples Airport.

=== Points of interest ===
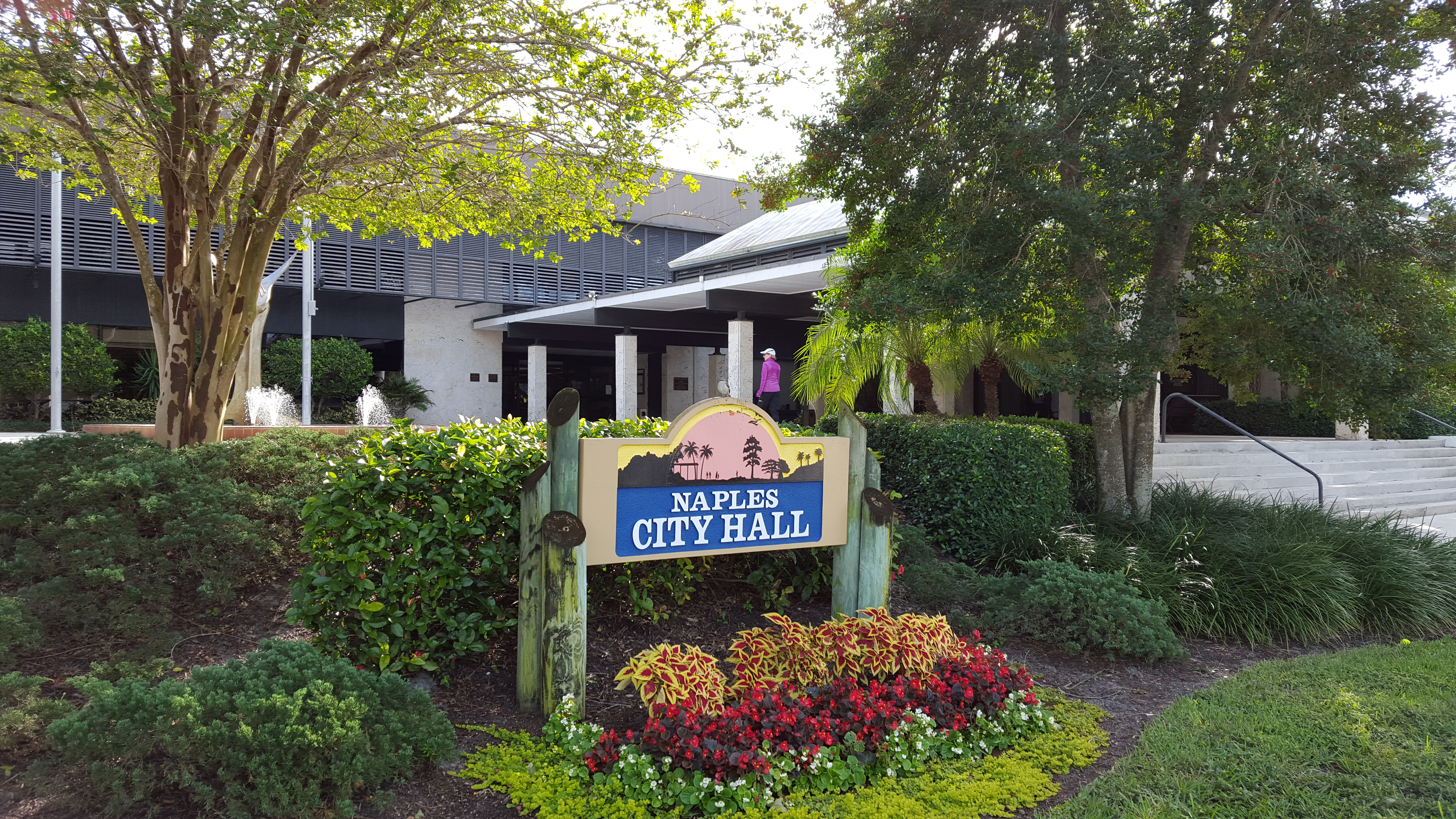
The front entrance of Naples City Hall

- Naples Botanical Garden
- Naples Depot Museum
- Naples Zoo
- Palm Cottage
- Waterside Shops
- Golisano Children's Museum of Naples
- Corkscrew Swamp Sanctuary

=== Performing arts ===
Naples is home to The Naples Players, Naples Shakespeare Festival (and sister company Marco Island Shakespeare Festival), Opera Naples, the equity theatre company Theatre Zone, and Gulfshore Playhouse. The Naples Philharmonic and The Baker Museum are located at Artis—Naples, which also serves as the educational campus for the Naples Philharmonic Youth Orchestra, Youth Chorus, Youth Jazz Orchestra and Youth Symphony. The Holocaust Museum and Education Center of Southwest Florida educates about 155,000 students each year both in its facility and with a locally traveling exhibit.

== Sports ==
The LPGA's longest-lasting continuously played tournament, the CME Group Tour Championship, has been held in Naples since 2012. Since 2013, it has been played at the Gold Course of the Tiburón Golf Club. It claims the largest purse and the largest winner's share of any women's golf tournament, presently at $5,000,000 and $1,500,000 respectively. The purse and winner's share increase in 2022, to $7,000,000 and $2,000,000 respectively.

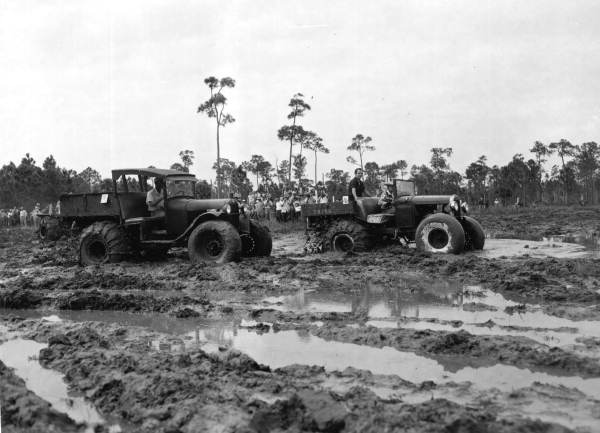
Swamp Buggy races in Naples

Pickleball is an increasingly popular sport in Naples. Because of this, many parks have added pickleball courts. Naples is home to the U.S. Open Pickleball Championships, which have been held annually since 2016., Because of this Naples and East Naples Community Park is known as the Pickleball Capital of the world.

Naples has two semi-pro soccer teams, Naples United FC, which was founded in 2017 and competes in the National Premier Soccer League and Naples City FC, which was founded in 2020 and competes in the United Premier Soccer League. Naples also has a professional soccer club called FC Naples, which was founded in 2025 and currently competes in USL League One.

Naples is also the home of swamp buggy races, held three times each year at the Florida Sports Park. The swamp buggy was invented in Naples.

== Parks and recreation ==
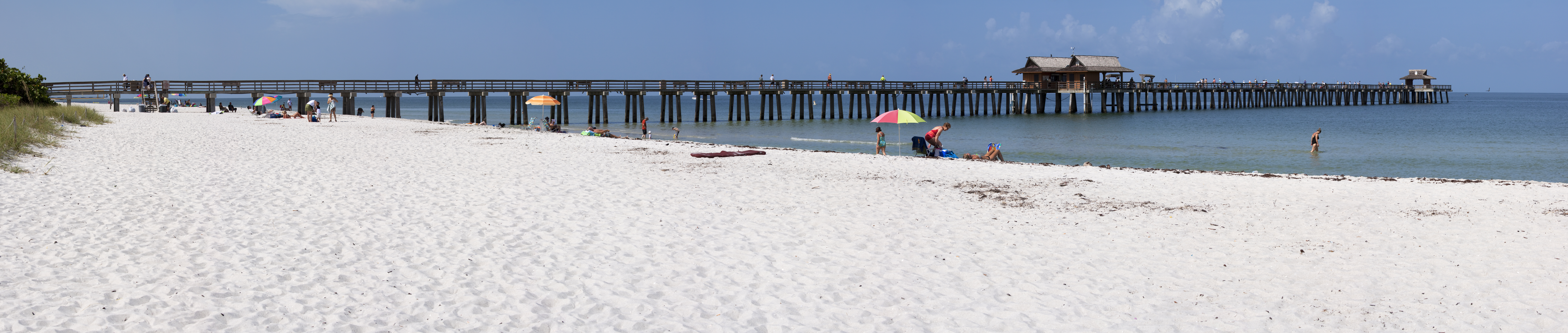
The Naples Pier was one of the area's better-known landmarks but was severely damaged by Hurricane Ian

The beach on the coast of the Gulf of Mexico is more than 10 miles (16 km) long and is known for its cleanliness and pristine white sand. In 2005, Naples was voted the best all-around beach in America by the Travel Channel.

Naples area beaches include:

- Delnor-Wiggins Pass State Park
- Clam Pass Beach Park
- Naples Pier
- Vanderbilt Beach
- North Gulfshore Boulevard Beach
- Seagate Beach
- Lowdermilk Beach Park

Naples area parks include:

- Arthur L. Allen Tennis Center
- Cambier Park

== Education ==
Naples is served by the District School Board of Collier County and various private institutions, including the following:

- St. Elizabeth Seton School (private)
- Naples High School (City of Naples, public)
- Barron G. Collier High School (public)
- Gulf Coast High School (public)
- St. John Neumann High School (private)
- Golden Gate High School (public)
- Lely High School (public)
- Palmetto Ridge High School (public)
- Community School of Naples (private)
- Seacrest Country Day School (private)
- First Baptist Academy (private)
- Mason Classical Academy (charter)
- Lorenzo Walker Technical High School (public)
- Naples Christian Academy (private)
- Saint Ann School (private)
- The Village School of Naples (private)
- Naples Classical Academy (charter)

=== Colleges and universities ===
While no colleges are based within the city limits, Ave Maria School of Law is located in Vineyards, and Florida SouthWestern State College has a satellite campus in Lely Resort. In addition, Florida Gulf Coast University operates continuing education classes from its Downtown Naples campus. Hodges University sold its campus in North Naples in 2021. Higher education institutions close to Naples include:

- Ave Maria University (35 miles northeast of Naples)
- Florida Gulf Coast University (28 miles northeast of Naples)
- Florida SouthWestern State College (30 miles northwest of Naples)

== Infrastructure ==
=== Transportation ===
==== Road ====
Since February 2001, Naples has been served by several bus routes operated by the Collier Area Transit. The service runs seven days a week and end times depend on the route. Highways that pass through Naples are I-75 and US-41.

==== Air ====
The city is served by the Naples Airport, and although it doesn't have any scheduled commercial service, it is one of the busiest municipal airports in the United States. The closest airport with regular-scheduled commercial service for both domestic and international destinations is Southwest Florida International Airport.

=== Healthcare ===
The region is served by the NCH Healthcare System, which currently has 716 beds between two hospitals, and Physician's Regional Healthcare System, which has two hospitals that contain 201 beds and is owned by the Health Management Associates, headquartered in Pelican Bay. In addition to the two hospitals, the company operates six clinics in Naples.

Healthcare Network of Southwest Florida (HCN) was founded in 1977 to serve migrant farmworkers and their families in Immokalee. It now provides care to over 41,000 residents of Collier County through 20 practices, including internal medicine, family practice, obstetrics, gynecology, pediatrics, behavioral health and dental care.

== Notable people ==
- Bill Bain, management consultant, founder of Bain & Company
- Billy Bigley, racing driver
- Larry Bird, American former professional basketball player
- Obe Blanc, member of 2010 U.S. Freestyle Wrestling World Team
- Ben Bova, award-winning science fiction author and science author
- Jim Breuer, Comedian, Actor, SNL Castmember (Goat Boy)
- Hayden Buckley, professional golfer
- Mary Carillo, former professional tennis player, now a sportscaster
- Michael Collins (1930–2021), Apollo 11 Command Module Pilot
- Robin Cook, author
- Mike Ditka, former NFL player and coach, former part-time Naples resident
- Byron Donalds, U.S. Representative and former Florida Representative
- Glennon Doyle, author, blogger, and activist
- Mike Duke, Ex-CEO of Walmart
- Keith Eloi, 2003 Lely high graduate, football wide receiver
- Chris Farren, Punk musician and artist
- Dominic Fike, singer, songwriter, rapper
- Ian Fletcher, tennis player, career-high singles ranking of world No. 56
- J. Dudley Goodlette (born 1948), politician and lawyer
- Laura Jane Grace, lead singer of Against Me!, attended Naples High School
- Earnest Graham, former NFL running back for the Tampa Bay Buccaneers
- Garnet Hathaway, ice hockey player for the Philadelphia Flyers
- Carlos Hyde, current NFL running back, Naples High graduate
- Courtney Jolly, professional monster truck driver
- Sonny Jurgensen, NFL Hall of Fame quarterback
- Shahid Khan, Pakistani-American billionaire, owner of the Jacksonville Jaguars, English soccer club Fulham and Flex-N-Gate
- John Kruk, Major League Baseball player and broadcaster (Philadelphia Phillies)
- John Schnatter, founder of Papa John's, has a residence in Naples
- Mickey Kuhn, child actor
- Denny Laine, first lead singer of The Moody Blues, Ginger Baker's Airforce, and Paul McCartney and Wings
- John Legere, former CEO of T-Mobile, purchased a Naples mansion in 2019
- Alex Lifeson, rock musician, has a home in Naples
- John Lodge, British musician for The Moody Blues
- Fred McCrary, former NFL player, graduated from Naples High School in 1991
- John P. Metras, American coach of Canadian football
- James Morgan, Producing Artistic Director of the York Theatre
- Earl Morrall, two-time Super Bowl champion and former NFL quarterback
- Piotr Nowak, former soccer player and head coach
- Jake O'Connell, former NFL tight end that went to Gulf Coast High School
- Drew O'Keefe, U.S. Attorney for the Eastern District of Pennsylvania, had a residence in Naples
- Chris Resop, former MLB pitcher
- Harvey Sarajian, professional soccer player
- Rick Scott, U.S. Senator and former Governor of Florida
- Richard M. Schulze, businessman, best known as the founder of Best Buy
- Bob Seger, musician who has a residence in Naples
- Judith Sheindlin, better known to the public as Judge Judy, author and television personality
- Donna Summer, entertainer; died at her Naples home in 2012
- Peter Thomas, the narrator of television programs
- Aysegul Timur, president of Florida Gulf Coast University
- Margit Varga, artist, gallerist, art director
- Abby Wambach, a former professional soccer player, has a home in Naples
- Jesse Witten, professional tennis player

== In popular culture ==
- Many movies have been filmed in or around Naples, such as Still Green, Just Cause, Pick-Up, and Thunder and Lightning.
- Scat, a young adult novel by Carl Hiaasen, is set in Naples.
