= Harriet Bedell =

Episcopal deaconess and missionary

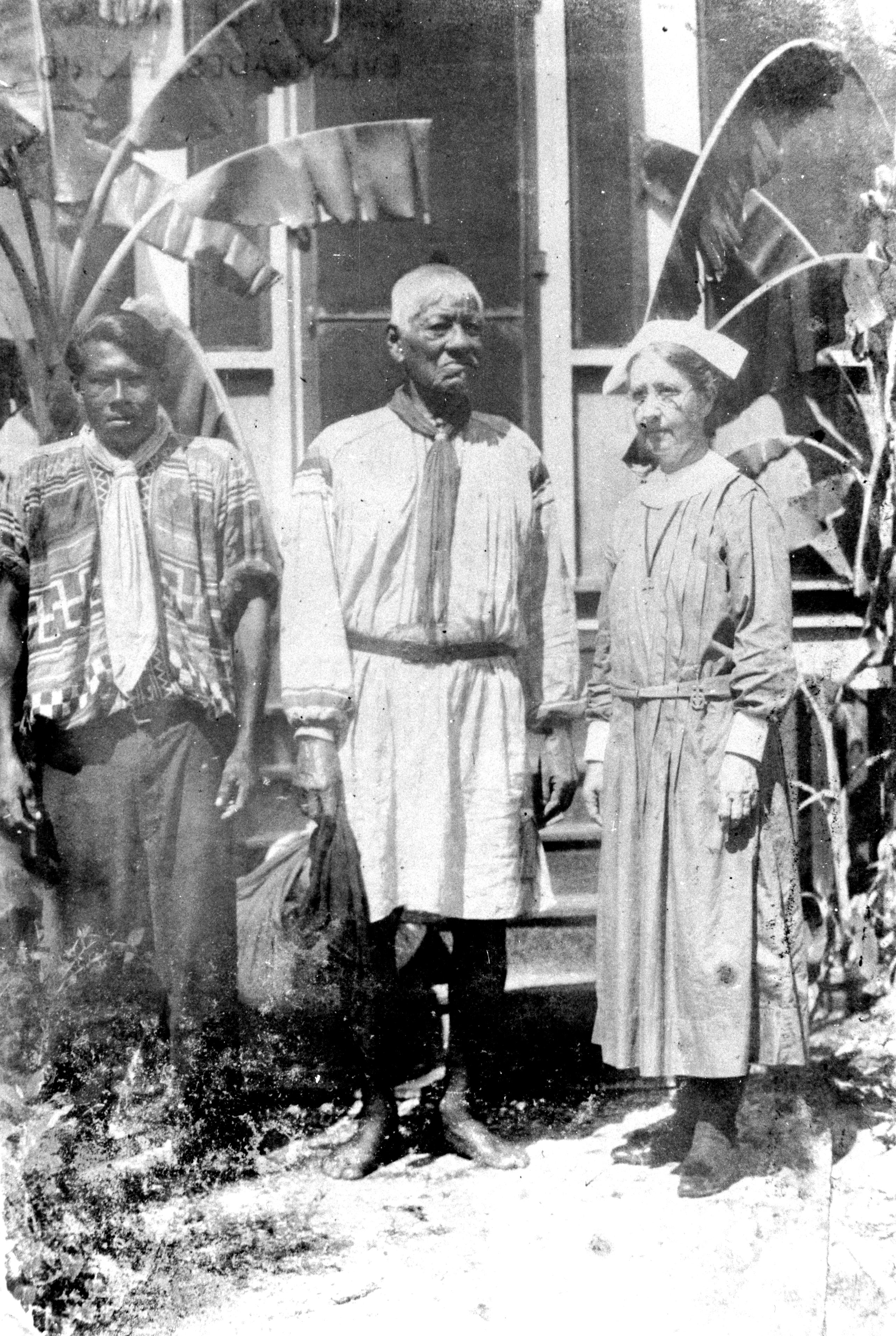
- Deaconess Bedell with a medicine man and Bobby Jim Tiger outside the Seminole mission, c. 1945

Deaconess and Missionary
- Born: March 19, 1875; Buffalo, New York, U.S.
- Died: January 8, 1969 (aged 93)
- Honored in: Episcopal Church (United States)
- Feast: 8 January

Harriet Bedell (March 19, 1875 – January 8, 1969) was an Episcopal deaconess and missionary to the Cheyenne in Oklahoma, Alaska Natives (spending 15 years at a missionary school), and the Seminole of Florida. She is remembered on the calendar of saints of the Episcopal Church in the United States of America on January 8.

== Early life and education ==
Harriet Bedell was born in Buffalo, New York, to a prominent local family (an uncle was a prominent hotelier). She went to local public schools and became a schoolteacher. In the early 1900s, she was inspired by preaching about vocations to imperial China and learned about the need for missionaries among the Native Americans. In 1906 Bedell studied at St. Faith's Training School for Deaconesses—begun in 1891 and renamed the New York Training School for Deaconesses in 1908—learning a range of topics from nutrition and hygiene to medicine and theology.

== Career ==
Upon completing her training, Bedell went to Oklahoma to become a missionary-teacher to the Cheyenne, since her mother balked at the prospect of an overseas posting. Thus, at the Whirlwind Mission (which had opened in 1897 and was named after a friendly chief), Bedell worked with deacon David Pendleton Oakerhater, a Cheyenne himself, and cared for the sick and poor while performing religious services and teaching women and children. During her 10-year ministry among the Cheyenne, Bedell learned to appreciate their culture, and was adopted into the tribe and given the name Vicsehia, meaning "Bird Woman." However, she developed tuberculosis and was sent to Colorado to recover.

=== Alaska ===
In 1916, Bedell accepted a remote post in Stevens Village, Alaska, 40 miles (64 km) south of the Arctic Circle. It was located between Fort Yukon and Rampart. She worked alone there for three years with the Athabascan people, and also helped to form an Episcopal boarding school for rural native children in nearby Tanana, since many children could not travel to local schools. In 1922, Bedell traveled to Portland, Oregon, and was formally ordained as a deaconess.

By 1931, the Great Depression adversely affected fundraising for the school, which depended on outside support. Bedell traveled back to New York to help raise money and succeeded in raising enough to pay off the school's debt, but not to continue operations, so it closed.

=== Florida ===
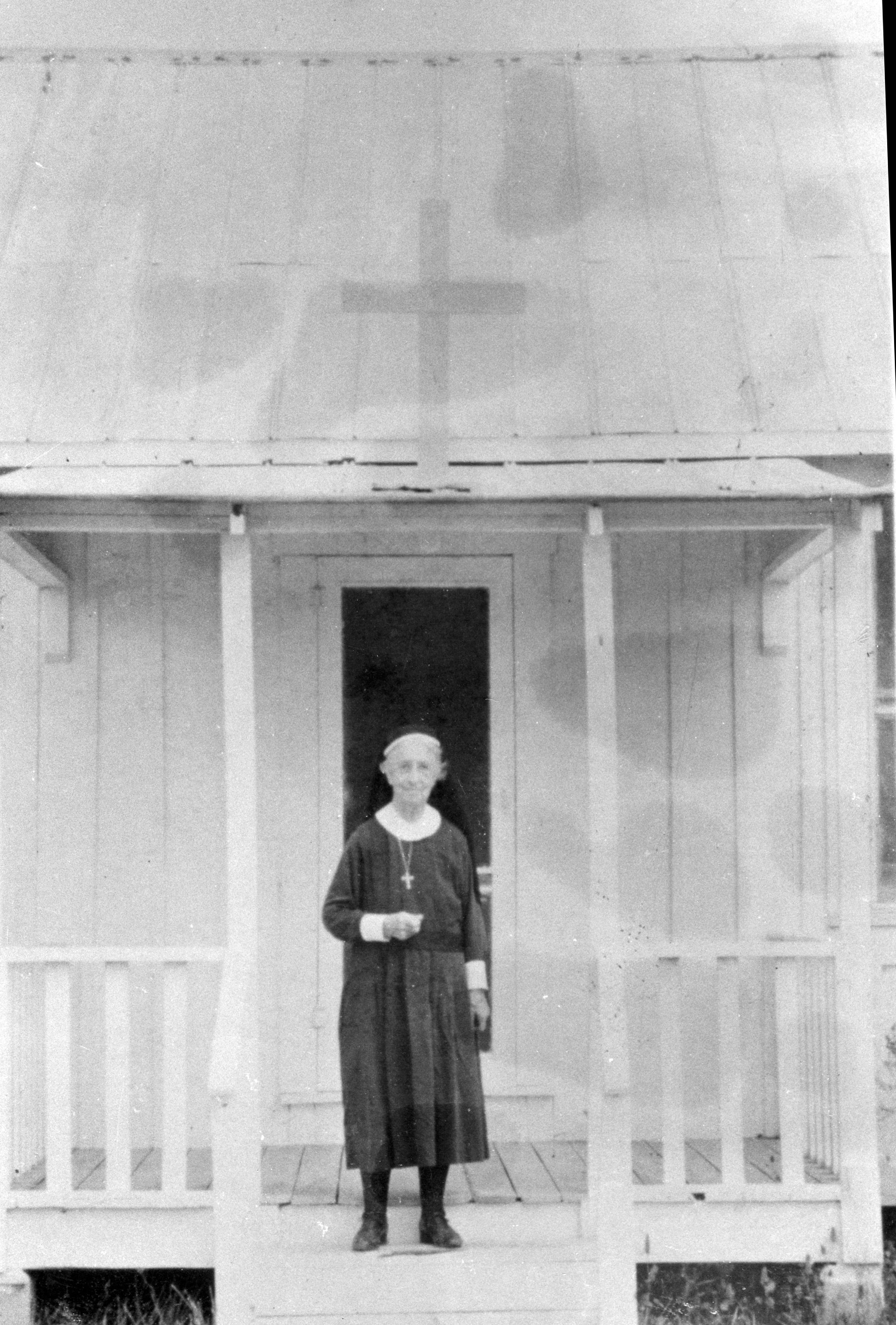
Deaconess Bedell on the porch of the Mission of Our Savior, Collier City, Florida

During her fundraising tours, Bedell visited a Seminole Indian reservation in South Florida. She ended up returning in 1932, revitalizing the Glade Cross mission in Everglades City, which had been established by Bishop William Crane Gray in 1898 and served by medical missionary Dr. William J. Godden until 1914. She also established another mission, Our Savior in Collier City—now part of the city of Marco Island—which moved to Goodland when the former city disbanded in 1957. She worked with whites, African Americans and indigenous people in Southwest Florida for the next three decades.

The native Mikasuki gave Bedell the name Inkoshopie (meaning woman who prays) and learned to appreciate her advice, garden, and business acumen. Aghast at the local men along the Tamiami Trail who wrestled alligators for tourists, Bedell encouraged the tribe's women to revive the doll-making and basket-weaving skills. She also encouraged them to incorporate their brilliant patchwork designs into clothing for both men and women. She also helped them sell their work to the tourist trade—both through an arrangement with the Collier Company and by negotiating with northern department stores, as well as by fighting the sale of mislabeled import goods in local tourist outlets. Sales from the arts and crafts store at Glades Cross Mission thus helped provide income and improve members' self-respect, as well as preserve traditional ways.

In 1947, Bedell gave the invocation at President Harry S. Truman's dedication of Everglades National Park, Although officially retired by the Board of Missions at age 72, she had arranged for the Glades mission to be funded by St. Stephens Episcopal Church in Coconut Grove in 1943 and continued her ministry well into her 80s. In 1960 Hurricane Donna destroyed her home and the Glade Cross mission. In Collier County, strong winds and coastal flooding destroyed 153 homes, severely damaged 409 more, and damaged an additional 1,049. In the aftermath, the county seat was also moved from Everglade to East Naples, Florida, and the Deltona Corporation began developing Marco Island.

Deaconess Bedell was one of the most popular writers in the national Episcopal mission periodical, The Spirit of Missions.

== Death and legacy ==
After Hurricane Donna, the bishop encouraged the 85-year-old Deaconess Bedell to enter the Bishop Gray Inn in Davenport, where she lived until she was 94, recruiting missionaries, teaching Sunday School, and working in the infirmary for many years. She was buried in Forest Hill Cemetery in Haines City in Polk County.

She was named a "Great Floridian" and a plaque was erected in her honor at the museum in Everglades City. The Episcopal Diocese of Southwest Florida began celebrating her life on the anniversary of her death, and the 8 January feast was extended to the Episcopal Church (USA) in 2009. Her papers are held by the State of Florida, which makes many of the photographs available online.
