= Everglades (disambiguation) =

The Everglades are wetlands in southern Florida, USA.

Everglades may also refer to:

== Places ==
=== Australia ===
- Everglades, Leura, a historic property in Leura, New South Wales
- Noosa Biosphere Reserve, Queensland, also known as Noosa Everglades

=== United States ===
- Everglades City, Florida, a city in Collier County, Florida formerly named Everglades
- Everglades Airpark, a public-use airport in Collier County, Florida
- Everglades National Park, a national park in Southern Florida
- Vizcayne, an urban development in Miami, Florida (formerly known as Everglades on the Bay)
- Everglades Parkway, another name for Alligator Alley in Florida
- Port Everglades, a port in Broward County, Florida

== Buildings ==
- Bank of Everglades Building, an historic building in Everglades City, Florida
- Everglades Laundry, an historic site in Everglades City, Florida
- Everglades Correctional Institution, a correctional centre opened in 1995

== Schools ==
- Everglades High School, a public school in Miramar, Florida
- Everglades University, a private college in Boca Raton, Florida
- Ransom Everglades School, a private school in Miami, Florida

== Media ==
- "Everglades", a 1960 song by The Kingston Trio from String Along
- "The Everglades (For Leonard)", a 2023 song by Blur from The Ballad of Darren
- The Everglades (TV series), a 1961–62 syndicated U.S. TV show set in the Florida Everglades
- The Everglades: River of Grass, a 1947 non-fiction book by Marjory Stoneman Douglas

== Other ==
- Everglades Digital Library, a library in Miami, Florida
- Everglades Foundation, an environmental organization in Palmetto Bay, Florida
- Everglades Stakes, a former horse race in Hialeah, Florida
- Everglades virus, an alphavirus in the Venezuelan equine encephalitis virus complex
- USS Everglades (AD-24), a US Klondike-class destroyer tender
- Everglades (train), a passenger train with end points in Boston and Miami, run jointly by the Pennsylvania Railroad, the Atlantic Coast Line Railroad and others, into the 1960s

== See also ==
- Everglade (disambiguation)
