= CCPL =

CCPL may refer to:

- Collier County Public Library, the public library system serving Collier County, Florida.
- Cuyahoga County Public Library, the public library system serving Cuyahoga County, Ohio.
- Cadet Corporal, within the AAFC
- Colored Citizens Protective League, Falls Church, Virginia African-American civil rights organization founded in 1915
