= Old Collier County Courthouse =

Coordinates: 25.857582°N 81.384742°W

- U.S. National Register of Historic Places

- Location within Florida Location within the United States
- Interactive map showing the location of Old Collier Courthouse
- Location: Everglades City, Florida
- Built: 1928
- Architectural style: Classical Revival
- NRHP reference No.: 13000875
- Added to NRHP: December 3, 2013

The Old Collier County Courthouse (also known as the Everglades City Hall) is a historic two-story concrete and stucco courthouse building located in Everglades City, Florida. Built in 1928, the Classical Revival-style structure served as Collier County's courthouse until 1962, when the county seat was moved to East Naples. Since then, the building has been used as the Everglades City Hall. Although recommended for demolition due to severe damage from Hurricane Wilma in 2005, the former courthouse underwent major repairs, and on December 3, 2013, it was added to the National Register of Historic Places.

== History ==
On May 8, 1923, Collier County, Florida, was established, carved from Lee County, named after advertising entrepreneur Barron Collier.Everglades (renamed Everglades City in 1965), incorporated as a town that year, became the county seat. Until a permanent courthouse could be constructed, the Collier Corporation Administration Building, Bank of Everglades Building, and Manhattan Mercantile Building partially served as a court. The courthouse was built in 1928 at a cost of approximately $25,000. Barron Collier and William O. Sparklin's Sparklin Gift Construction Co. erected the building, while architectural firm Bail, Horton and Associates provided its design.

The Collier County Courthouse opened in 1928, right before the dedication of the Tamiami Trail. A two-story classical revival-style structure composed of concrete and stucco, the building is located at 102 Copeland Avenue North. Two additions were made in the following decades, the first in 1948 and the second in 1956. The former resulted in modifications to the portico and the construction of a rear addition. In 1956, a new chamber for the judge and another jury room were created. The Coastal Cooling Corporation then added air conditioning during the following year.

By the late 1950s, controversy arose regarding the location of the county seat, sometimes referred to as the "Courthouse War." Because Immokalee and Naples grew significantly, a movement started to relocate the county seat to an area closer to the population center. Ultimately, the voters of Collier County chose East Naples over Everglades by a 1,647 to 1,006 margin in 1959, although it was not in effect until 1962. Hurricane Donna flooded the courthouse in 1960, with water reaching waist-deep height on the ground floor, damaging many county records. Two years later, a new courthouse complex opened in East Naples. Since then, the former Collier County Courthouse building has served as Everglades City Hall.

Two modifications in the 1980s led to the addition of a handicap ramp of the building's east side and a new roof. In 1989, the Old Collier County Courthouse was listed in "A Guide to Florida's Historic Architecture," published by the University Press of Florida. The courthouse was listed on the National Register of Historic Places on December 3, 2013. Hurricane Wilma severely damaged the building in 2005. Consequently, the Federal Emergency Management Agency (FEMA) recommended that it be demolished. The Everglades City mayor Sammy Hamilton objected, and a later report from a historical specialist employed by FEMA supported Hamilton's view. Following a significant restoration project, the structure re-opened during a ceremony held on January 7, 2007.

== See also ==
- National Register of Historic Places listings in Collier County, Florida
