= Everglades City, Florida =

City in the United States

Everglades City
- City
- City of Everglades City
- Everglades City City Hall (Old Collier County Courthouse)

- Location in Collier County and the state of Florida
- Coordinates: 25°51′29″N 81°23′10″W
- Country: United States
- State: Florida
- County: Collier
- Settled (Everglade): 1873-1895
- Incorporated (Town of Everglades): 1923
- Incorporated (City of Everglades): 1953
- Reincorporated (City of Everglades City): 1965

Government
  - Type: Mayor-Council
  - Mayor: Howell "Howie" Grimm Jr.
  - Mayor Pro Tem: Vicky Wells
  - Councilors: Parker Oglesby, Michael McComas, Tony Pernas, and Diana Valdes
  - City Clerk: Dorothy "Dottie" K. Joiner
  - City Attorney: Zachary "Zach" Lombardo

Area
  - Total: 1.20 sq mi (3.11 km^{2})
  - Land: 0.92 sq mi (2.37 km^{2})
  - Water: 0.29 sq mi (0.74 km^{2})
- Elevation: 0 ft (0 m)

Population (2020)
  - Total: 352
  - Density: 384.6/sq mi (148.48/km^{2})
- Time zone: UTC-5 (Eastern (EST))
  - Summer (DST): UTC-4 (EDT)
- ZIP code: 34139
- Area code: 239
- FIPS code: 12-21425
- GNIS feature ID: 2403583
- Website: www.cityofeverglades.org

Everglades City is a city in Collier County, Florida, United States, of which it was once the county seat. It is part of the Naples–Marco Island Metropolitan Statistical Area, which is included in the Cape Coral-Fort Myers-Naples Combined Statistical Area. The Marjory Stoneman Douglas Visitor Center for Everglades National Park is located in Everglades City. As of the 2020 US census, the population was 352, down from 400 in the 2010 US census.

== History ==
The Museum of the Everglades (formerly the Everglades Laundry) in Everglades City

The area around Chokoloskee Bay, including the site of Everglades City, was occupied for thousands of years by Native Americans of the Glades culture, who were absorbed by the Calusa shortly before the arrival of Europeans in the New World.

=== 19th century ===
By the time Spanish Florida was transferred from Spain to the United States in 1821 as Florida Territory, the area was uninhabited. A legend says that Seminoles planted potatoes along what is now the Barron River during the Seminole Wars, in the vicinity of the present Everglades City.

American settlement began after the Civil War, when Union sympathizers who had farmed on Cape Sable to supply Key West during the war moved up the west coast of the peninsula. The first permanent settler was William Smith Allen, who arrived on the banks of Potato Creek (later renamed the Allen River) in 1873. After Allen retired to Key West in 1889, George W. Storter, Jr. became the principal landowner in the area. Storter gained fame for his sugar cane crops. He opened a trading post in 1892, and gained a post office, called "Everglade", in 1895. Storter also began entertaining northern tourists who came to Everglade by yacht in the winter to hunt and fish. His house eventually grew into the Rod and Gun Club, visited by United States Presidents and other notables.

The first school in Everglade was organized in 1893. The school moved into a new building in 1895, but the building was destroyed by a tornado later in the year.

=== 20th century ===
The next school building was washed away by the 1910 hurricane. A Methodist circuit rider began visiting Everglade in 1888, and another Methodist minister began a four-year residency the next year. After that, Everglade was occasionally visited by itinerant preachers of various denominations. The Episcopal Church established a mission at Immokalee which eventually moved to Everglade when revitalized in the 1930s by Harriet Bedell.

In 1922, Barron Collier began buying large areas of land in what was then southern Lee County. In 1923, the Florida legislature created Collier County from Lee County, and they chose the county seat to be in Everglade. During that same year, it only consisted of a dozen families, but some northern sportsmen had established winter homes there. Also in 1923, the community was officially incorporated as the "Town of Everglades" (adding the "s").

The Tamiami Trail, which crossed Collier's domain, passed five miles north of Everglades City. While construction was proceeding on the Trail (it was completed in 1929), Collier pushed construction of what became State Road 29 from Everglades City to Immokalee, providing the town with its first land connection to the rest of the state. In 1928, the Atlantic Coast Line Railroad began service to Everglades City, which became the southernmost point the Coast Line ever reached. Service was provided by an extension of the Coast Line's Haines City Branch from Immokalee to Deep Lake, where it connected to Collier's Deep Lake Railroad, an earlier railroad that transported agricultural freight. The railroad was removed in 1957.

In 1953, the "Town of Everglades" became the "City of Everglades". In 1960, the strong winds and coastal flooding of Hurricane Donna combined to destroy 153 homes in Collier County, as well as inflict major damage on 409 more, and damage an additional 1,049. Everglades was hard hit, and two years later, Florida's legislature moved the county seat to East Naples, Florida. In 1965, the state legislature changed the city's name to the "City of Everglades City".

Between 1981 and 1983, the city was subject to Operation Everglades, an anti-drug smuggling operation by the Drug Enforcement Administration.

== Geography ==
Everglades City is at the mouth of the Barron River, on Chokoloskee Bay. Chokoloskee Bay is approximately ten miles (16 km) long and 2 miles (3.2 km) wide, and runs southeast to northwest along the mainland of Collier County. It is separated from the Gulf of Mexico by the northern end of the Ten Thousand Islands. According to the United States Census Bureau, the city has a total area of 1.2 square miles (3.1 km^{2}), of which 0.9 square miles (2.3 km^{2}) is land and 0.2 square miles (0.52 km^{2}) (21.01%) is water.

=== Climate ===
Everglades City has a tropical climate, similar to the climate found in much of the Caribbean. It is part of the only region in the 48 contiguous states that falls under that category. More specifically, it generally has a tropical savanna climate (Köppen climate classification: Aw), bordering a tropical monsoon climate (Köppen climate classification: Am).

Climate data for Everglades City 5 NE, Florida, 1991–2020 normals, extremes 2007–present
Month	Jan	Feb	Mar	Apr	May	Jun	Jul	Aug	Sep	Oct	Nov	Dec	Year
Record high °F (°C)	92 (33)	95 (35)	96 (36)	99 (37)	99 (37)	100 (38)	99 (37)	100 (38)	99 (37)	96 (36)	94 (34)	93 (34)	100 (38)
Mean daily maximum °F (°C)	77.1 (25.1)	80.8 (27.1)	83.3 (28.5)	86.7 (30.4)	90.3 (32.4)	90.9 (32.7)	92.5 (33.6)	92.6 (33.7)	91.1 (32.8)	87.4 (30.8)	83.2 (28.4)	79.7 (26.5)	86.3 (30.2)
Daily mean °F (°C)	65.1 (18.4)	68.2 (20.1)	70.3 (21.3)	74.4 (23.6)	78.2 (25.7)	81.7 (27.6)	83.7 (28.7)	83.9 (28.8)	82.8 (28.2)	78.7 (25.9)	72.4 (22.4)	68.5 (20.3)	75.7 (24.3)
Mean daily minimum °F (°C)	53.1 (11.7)	55.7 (13.2)	57.3 (14.1)	62.0 (16.7)	66.1 (18.9)	72.4 (22.4)	74.9 (23.8)	75.3 (24.1)	74.5 (23.6)	70.0 (21.1)	61.6 (16.4)	57.4 (14.1)	65.0 (18.3)
Record low °F (°C)	28 (−2)	29 (−2)	35 (2)	41 (5)	54 (12)	64 (18)	70 (21)	70 (21)	66 (19)	45 (7)	40 (4)	29 (−2)	28 (−2)
Average precipitation inches (mm)	1.70 (43)	2.11 (54)	2.28 (58)	2.61 (66)	3.71 (94)	11.70 (297)	7.44 (189)	7.66 (195)	9.05 (230)	3.76 (96)	1.45 (37)	1.81 (46)	55.28 (1,404)
Average precipitation days (≥ 0.01 in)	5.2	4.1	4.2	5.4	8.9	16.5	17.1	17.4	16.6	10.5	4.4	5.0	115.3
Source: NOAA

== Demographics ==
Historical population
Census	Pop.	Note	%±
1930	172		—
1940	518		201.2%
1950	625		20.7%
1960	552		−11.7%
1970	462		−16.3%
1980	524		13.4%
1990	321		−38.7%
2000	479		49.2%
2010	400		−16.5%
2020	352		−12.0%
U.S. Decennial Census

=== 2010 and 2020 census ===
Everglades City racial composition (Hispanics excluded from racial categories) (NH = Non-Hispanic)
Race	Pop 2010	Pop 2020	% 2010	% 2020
White (NH)	336	283	84.00%	80.40%
Black or African American (NH)	3	0	0.75%	0.00%
Native American or Alaska Native (NH)	9	9	2.25%	2.56%
Asian (NH)	0	0	0.00%	0.00%
Pacific Islander or Native Hawaiian (NH)	0	0	0.00%	0.00%
Some other race (NH)	0	1	0.00%	0.28%
Two or more races/Multiracial (NH)	7	6	1.75%	1.70%
Hispanic or Latino (any race)	45	53	11.25%	15.06%
Total	400	352	100.00%	100.00%

As of the 2020 United States census, there were 352 people, 103 households, and 59 families residing in the city.

As of the 2010 United States census, there were 400 people, 106 households, and 80 families residing in the city.

=== 2000 census ===
As of the census of 2000, there were 479 people, 230 households, and 154 families residing in the city. The population density was 513.2 inhabitants per square mile (198.1/km^{2}). There were 345 housing units at an average density of 369.6 per square mile (142.7/km^{2}). The racial makeup of the city was 96.45% White, 0.84% African American, 0.63% Native American, 0.42% Asian, 1.46% from other races, and 0.21% from two or more races. Hispanic or Latino of any race were 3.97% of the population.

In 2000, there were 230 households, out of which 13.9% had children under the age of 18 living with them, 60.0% were married couples living together, 3.0% had a female householder with no husband present, and 33.0% were non-families. Of all households, 27.0% were made up of individuals, and 9.1% had someone living alone who was 65 years of age or older. The average household size was 2.08 and the average family size was 2.50.

In 2000, in the city, the population was spread out, with 11.9% under the age of 18, 4.2% from 18 to 24, 19.0% from 25 to 44, 30.5% from 45 to 64, and 34.4% who were 65 years of age or older. The median age was 25 years. For every 100 females, there were 104.7 males. For every 100 females age 18 and over, there were 111.0 males.

In 2000, the median income for a household in the city was $36,667, and the median income for a family was $38,929. Males had a median income of $32,083 versus $22,222 for females. The per capita income for the city was $20,535. About 6.1% of families and 6.0% of the population were below the poverty line, including 9.5% of those under age 18 and 1.6% of those age 65 or older.

== Historic buildings ==
Historic buildings in Everglades City include the Old Collier County Courthouse, Bank of Everglades Building, and Everglades Laundry (now the Museum of the Everglades).

== Education ==
The city's public schools are operated by the District School Board of Collier County.

- eCollier Virtual Academy School (K-12)
- Everglades City School (VPK-12)
- Optima Classical Academy School (K-12)

== Library ==
Collier County Public Library (CCPL) is the public library system that serves Collier County, and the one branch located within Everglades City is the Everglades City Branch Library.
