= George W. Storter Jr. =

Founder of Everglades City and trader

- Born: July 1, 1862; Eutaw, Alabama, C.S.
- Died: October 26, 1931 (aged 69); Fort Myers, Florida, U.S.
- Known for: Trading post, founder of Everglades
- Children: Neal Storter

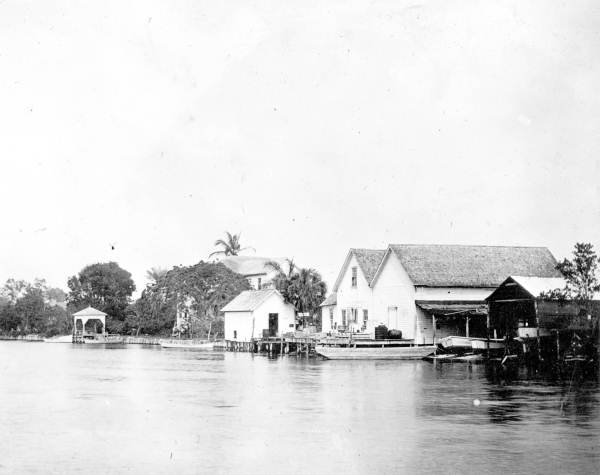
Storter's trading post

George Washington Storter Jr. (July 1, 1862 – October 26, 1931) was a trader and founder of Everglades City. His grandfather George Sr. migrated in a covered wagon to Platt, Florida, from Eutaw, Alabama in 1877, making his first trip to the Everglades in September 1881 to farm with one William S. Allen.

George Jr. purchased large tracts of land further south along Chokoloskee Bay and founded the town of Everglade, later to become Everglades City, in 1893. From there the family shipped buttonwood, cane syrup, and grapefruits to Tampa. They also operated a trading post where Seminoles came to barter or sell deer hides and alligator skins. George Storter Jr. became famous for the sugar cane he grew. His main competition came from Ted Smallwood of the Ted Smallwood Store.

Settlements start in Chokoloskee Bay of Collier County, Florida, along the Barron River. The American Civil War saw many Union refugees flee the Confederate state of Florida for Key West, still a member of the Union. As population increased, officials at Key West gave some of them tools, seeds and supplies for purposes of gardening at Cape Sable and on some of the Keys. John Weeks was one of these, and the first to settle on the Barron River c. 1861. William Smith Allen, who gave the Barron River its name until 1923, was the first permanent white settler of Everglade. Originally from Connecticut, he eventually moved to Jacksonville, and with the outbreak of war he, with other Unionists, went to Key West. Allen first visited Weeks in 1868 and was impressed by the soil. He then returned, owning all of the present-day Everglade township along the river from 1873 to 1889. "But the real founder of Everglades and its most influential citizen for over a quarter of a century was George W. Storter Jr."

A site called Port DuPont along the Barron river was settled by African-American August Swycover and his wife. They planted sugar cane along the west bank of the river. Swycover shipped the sugar to Key West, used in those days for chewing. By 1883, George Sr. established himself opposite the Port DuPont site. By 1887, George W. Storter Jr. and Nancy arrived; and on January 1, 1889, the first white child was born in the Everglade. A miss Frances Eva Storter, Neal's older sister. After Allen's death, George W. Storter Jr. purchased all the Allen property for $800. In 1895 he secured the first post office first called Everglade with him as postmaster.
