= East Naples, Florida =

- Unincorporated community
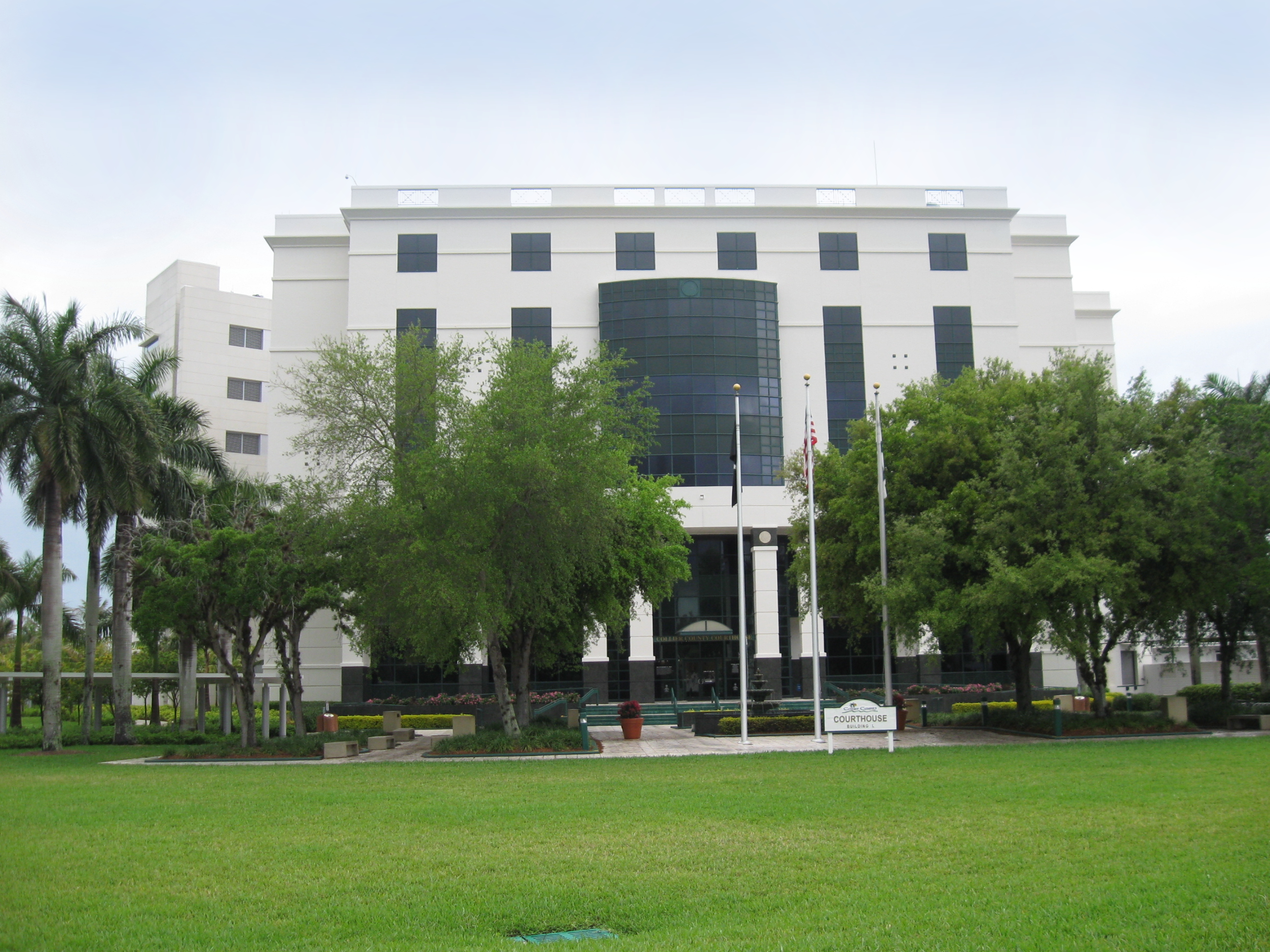
- Collier County Court House in East Naples

- Location within the state of Florida East Naples (the United States)
- Coordinates: 26°07′35″N 81°45′20″W
- Country: United States
- State: Florida
- County: Collier
- Elevation: 7 ft (2.1 m)

Population (2023)
  - Total: (est) 19,024
- Time zone: UTC-5 (Eastern (EST))
  - Summer (DST): UTC-4 (EDT)
- ZIP code: 34112
- GNIS feature ID: 282004

East Naples is an unincorporated community and the county seat of Collier County, Florida, United States. East Naples has been the county seat since 1962, when the Collier County Courthouse was moved from Everglades (see Old Collier County Courthouse).

East Naples is part of the Naples–Marco Island Metropolitan Statistical Area.

== History ==
Collier County, Florida, was established by the Florida Legislature in 1923, split from Lee County and named after advertising entrepreneur Barron Collier. Upon the founding of Collier County, Everglades (later Everglades City) became its county seat. While Naples and its vicinity grew significantly during the next few decades, Everglades remained a small community well removed from the more populated areas. This change was reflected in 1957, when Naples acquired two seats on the county commission rather than one, shifting the balance of power away from Everglades. By August 1958, discussions about moving the county seat from Everglades to Naples occurred, with state representative candidate D.C. "Doc" Brown announcing that he was in favor of it. An effort led by the Naples Junior Chamber of Commerce resulted in the collection of 2,400 signatures for a petition to move the county seat, enough to force an election to settle the matter.

A tally of the results for the county seat election on May 19, 1959, included 811 votes for East Naples, 653 for Everglades, 596 for Naples, and 393 for Immokalee. The Miami Herald suggested that "a possible factor in the lead of East Naples over the older and larger city of Naples was that all county seat location site gift offerings are in East Naples," which included free land for a new county courthouse. Other reasons why East Naples gained favor over Naples is that county officials announced that they would need at least 20 acres (8.1 ha) of land for a new courthouse and that the county jail would still be away from the most populated areas. East Naples and Everglades advanced to a run-off election on June 9, with the former defeating the latter by 1,647 to 1,006 votes.

In 1960, Hurricane Donna overturned or destroyed about two dozen mobile homes at one trailer park alone and unroofed and shattered windows at half of the classrooms at the newly built elementary school, which was also flooded. Donna also severely damaged Everglades, including the Collier County Courthouse. Consequently, the Florida Legislature also approved moving the county seat to East Naples in 1962. The new county courthouse opened in East Naples on September 4, 1962, a structure which cost about $1.6 million to construct.

The Collier County Courthouse was expanded in 1974 and 1990, before another one, costing approximately $39.2 million to build, opened in 2007 at the Collier County Government Center. In 1978, the Collier Museum at Government Center was established, which is an educational facility focusing on the county's history.

== Geography ==
East Naples, Florida, is in western Collier County. More specifically, it is located immediately east of Naples and near other unincorporated communities such as Golden Gate (to its northeast) and Lely (to its southeast). East Naples is part of the Naples-Marco Island, Florida Metropolitan Statistical Area, which comprises all of Collier County. The community's average elevation is 7 feet (2.1 m), while its zip code is 34112.

== Demographics ==
Historical population
Census	Pop.	Note	%±
1970	6,152		—
1980	12,127		97.1%
1990	22,951		89.3%

Although East Naples remains unincorporated, the United States Census Bureau (USCB) has counted the community's population and sometimes listed it as a census-designated place (CDP). The first census of East Naples occurred in 1970, which recorded a population of 6,152 people. This number increased to 12,127 people in 1980 and 22,951 in 1990, before the East Naples CDP was deleted from the census.

The USCB's 2019-2023 American Community Survey (ACS) estimated that East Naples has a population of 19,024. Of those people, 9,636 are males and 9,388 are females. The median age is 56-years-old, with people 65 years of age and older accounting for 41.6% of the population. In terms of household income, the median in East Naples is $70,764. About 96.1% of residents have earned at least a high school diploma or equivalent. The racial demographics of the community are: 70% white, 14.2% mixed race, 6.9% African American, 6.2% other, 1.5% Asian, 1% Native American, and 0.2% Native Hawaiian/Pacific Islander. The percentage of individuals with Hispanic ancestry is unknown, but 20.1% of people identified as being Mexican as of the mid-2020s, the most common ethnicity in East Naples.

== Notable people ==
- Warner Wolf, sportscaster
