= Everglade =

Everglade may refer to:

- Everglades, region of tropical wetlands in the US
- Everglade Township, Stevens County, Minnesota, township in Stevens County, Minnesota, the United States
- "Everglade" (song), a 1992 song by L7
- "Everglade", a song by Antony and the Johnsons from The Crying Light

== See also ==
- Everglades (disambiguation)
