= Air France Flight 343 =

1960 aviation accident in Senegal

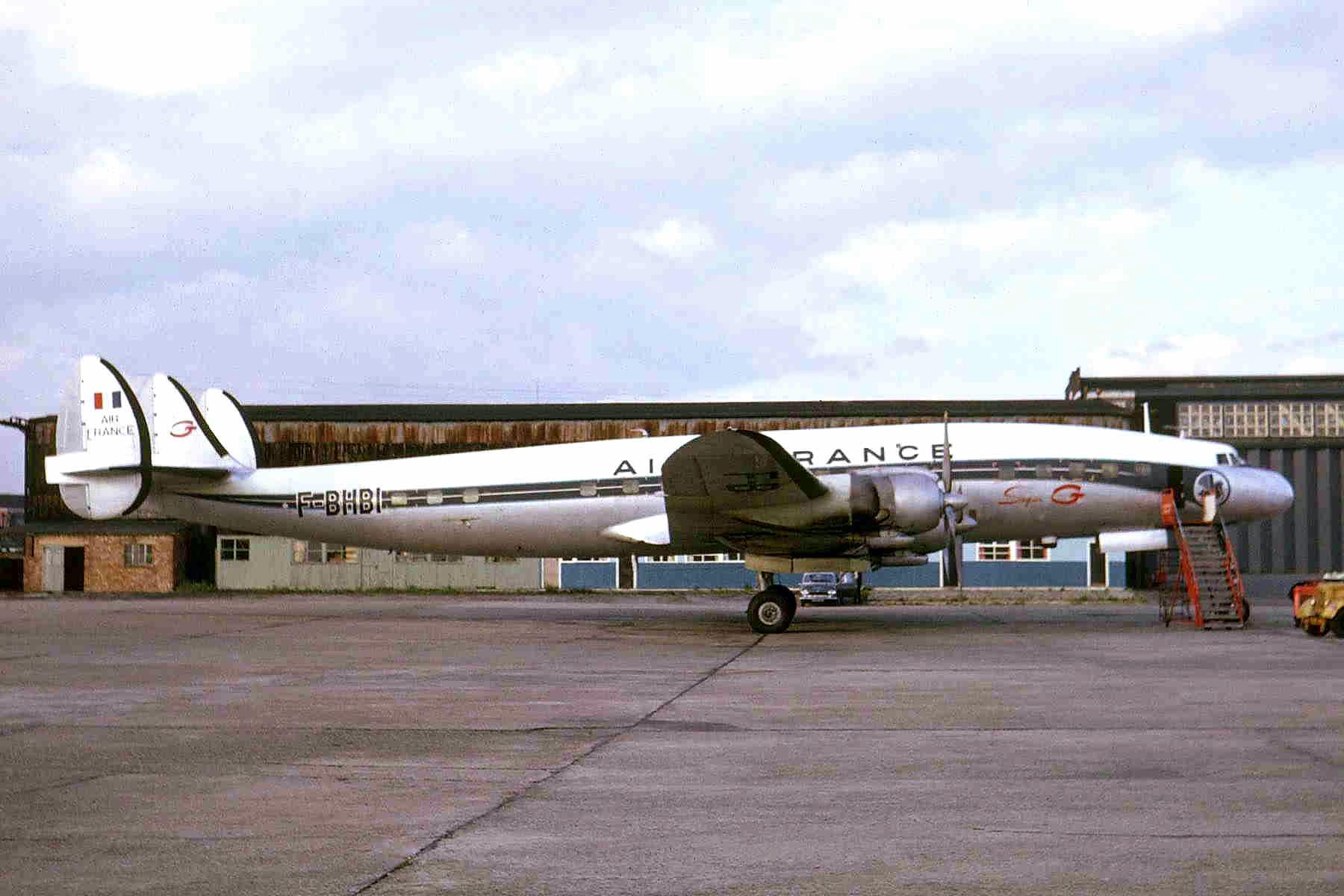
- An Air France Super Constellation similar to the accident aircraft

Accident
- Date: 29 August 1960
- Summary: Crashed following aborted landing in rainy conditions; cause undetermined
- Site: Atlantic Ocean, off Dakar, Senegal; 14°43′03″N 17°31′21″W

Aircraft
- Aircraft type: Lockheed L-1049G Super Constellation
- Operator: Air France
- Registration: F-BHBC
- Flight origin: Paris, France
- 1st stopover: Yoff Airport, Dakar, Senegal
- 2nd stopover: Monrovia, Liberia
- Destination: Abidjan, Ivory Coast
- Occupants: 63
- Passengers: 55
- Crew: 8
- Fatalities: 63
- Survivors: 0

Air France Flight 343 was a scheduled international passenger flight from Paris, France, to Abidjan, Ivory Coast, with scheduled stopovers at Dakar, Senegal, and Monrovia, Liberia. On 29 August 1960, around 06:50, the aircraft crashed into the Atlantic Ocean while attempting to land at Yoff Airport, Dakar. All 55 passengers and 8 crew were killed. A tribunal concluded that the pilot, who had earlier been punished by Air France for recklessness, had continued to land without use of instruments in bad weather, amounting to willful misconduct.

== Aircraft and flight ==
Air France Flight 343 was a scheduled passenger service from Paris, France, to Abidjan, Ivory Coast. It made scheduled stopovers at Dakar, Senegal, and Monrovia, Liberia. On the day of the incident the aircraft flying the route was a Lockheed 1049G Super Constellation with registration F-BHBC. This aircraft had first flown in 1955 and had recorded 16,417 flight hours.

== Incident ==
The aircraft approached Yoff Airport, Dakar, in low overcast conditions just before sunrise on 29 August 1960. There was 7/8ths cloud cover at a height of 2,000–3,000 feet (610–910 m) and visibility was rapidly changeable. There were rain squalls and thunderstorms.

The pilot attempted to land the aircraft on runway 01 but aborted this attempt. The pilot was offered an instrument landing system landing on runway 30 but declined and entered a holding pattern, hoping that weather conditions would improve. Shortly after 06:41 the pilot started a second landing approach on runway 01. The landing was aborted at 06:47 and the aircraft overflew the airport. The pilot made a report to air traffic control, giving his height as 1,000 feet (300 m). Shortly afterwards the aircraft entered a rain squall.

The aircraft crashed into the Atlantic Ocean at a point around 1 mile (1.6 km) offshore and 1.5 miles (2.4 km) from Les Mamelles Lighthouse. It struck the water at a steep angle and probably while banking to the right. All 55 passengers and 8 crew on board were killed, including the French West African poet David Diop.

== Investigation and aftermath ==
The aircraft crashed in water 130 feet (40 m) deep. A salvage attempt was made and, although most of the bodies were recovered, only 20 percent of the wreckage was brought back to shore. The Bureau of Enquiry and Analysis for Civil Aviation Safety investigated but could not determine the cause of the crash. It proposed a number of possibilities: a structural failure or loss of control caused by turbulence; a sensory illusion; distraction of the flight crew, possibly by a lightning strike; failure of an airspeed indicator or altimeter or faulty reading thereof.

A number of cases were brought against Air France for compensation under the Warsaw Convention by the families of the victims, including by Diop's widow. The Diop case was decided in 1964 at the Tribunal de grande instance de Seine, it was appealed to the Court of Appeal of Paris. The decision was made to award the basic level of compensation but not that Air France was particularly negligent. The court found the pilot, who had been earlier punished by Air France for recklessness, had continued to land without use of instruments in bad weather, amounting to wilful misconduct.
