= Everglades Laundry =

- U.S. National Register of Historic Places
- The building in 2019

- Location within Florida Location within the United States
- Location: Everglades City, Florida
- Coordinates: 25°51′24″N 81°23′8″W
- NRHP reference No.: 01001012
- Added to NRHP: September 22, 2001

The Museum of the Everglades is in the former Everglades Laundry building, a historic site at 105 West Broadway in Everglades City, Florida. On September 22, 2001, the site was added to the U.S. National Register of Historic Places. The wayside marker describes it as the Old Laundry Building, and it was completed in 1928, serving in the capacity as a community laundry building. It became the clubhouse for the "Everglades Women's Club" in 1965, when it was purchased from the Colliers.

== Museum of the Everglades ==
The site is now the home of the Museum of the Everglades, opened in 1998 by the Collier County Museum. Exhibits display the history and culture of the southwest Everglades area, including the ancient Calusa, Seminole, pioneers and entrepreneurs, such as Barron Collier.

== References and external links ==
- Collier County listings at National Register of Historic Places
- Florida's Office of Cultural and Historical Programs
  - Collier County markers
  - Museum of the Everglades
- Old Laundry Building Waymark
