= Goodland, Florida =

- Census-designated place
- Location in Collier County and the state of Florida
- Coordinates: 25°55′30″N 81°38′52″W
- Country: United States
- State: Florida
- County: Collier

Area
  - Total: 0.38 sq mi (0.99 km^{2})
  - Land: 0.15 sq mi (0.40 km^{2})
  - Water: 0.23 sq mi (0.59 km^{2})
- Elevation: 7 ft (2.1 m)

Population (2020)
  - Total: 312
  - Density: 2,020.0/sq mi (779.91/km^{2})
- Time zone: UTC-5 (Eastern (EST))
  - Summer (DST): UTC-4 (EDT)
- ZIP code: 34140
- Area code: 239
- FIPS code: 12-26775
- GNIS feature ID: 2402538

Goodland is a census-designated place (CDP) in Collier County, Florida, United States. The population was 312 at the 2020 census, up from 267 at the 2010 census. It is part of the Naples–Marco Island Metropolitan Statistical Area. Located on the southeast portion of Marco Island, it is the closest community to Cape Romano, the southern tip of a nearby island that was the official site of the Florida landfall of Hurricane Wilma. Goodland is home to several seafood restaurants and some charter boat operators.

== Geography ==
Goodland is located in southwestern Collier County. The beachfront city of Marco Island is 6 miles (10 km) to the west. Goodland is nearly surrounded by water, with Goodland Bay to the north, Coon Key Pass to the east, and Blue Hill Creek to the south. To the west, an artificial inlet of Blue Hill Creek separates Goodland from forested wetland within the city limits of Marco Island.

According to the United States Census Bureau, the Goodland CDP has a total area of 0.35 square miles (0.9 km^{2}), of which 0.15 square miles (0.4 km^{2}) is land and 0.19 square miles (0.5 km^{2}), or 57.47%, is water.

Goodland has a tropical savanna climate that consists of warm dry winters and hot humid summers. Wet season is from April 1 to September 30 and Dry season is from October 1 to March 31.

== Demographics ==
Historical population
Census	Pop.	Note	%±
2000	320		—
2010	267		−16.6%
2020	312		16.9%
U.S. Decennial Census

=== 2020 census ===
Goodland racial composition (Hispanics excluded from racial categories) (NH = Non-Hispanic)
Race	Number	Percentage
White (NH)	289	92.63%
Native American or Alaska Native (NH)	1	0.32%
Asian (NH)	2	0.64%
Mixed/Multi-Racial (NH)	6	1.92%
Hispanic or Latino	14	4.49%
Total	312	

As of the 2020 United States census, there were 312 people, 98 households, and 58 families residing in the CDP.

=== 2000 census ===
As of the census of 2000, there were 320 people, 186 households, and 88 families residing in the CDP. The population density was 1,512.0 inhabitants per square mile (583.8/km^{2}). There were 317 housing units at an average density of 1,497.8 per square mile (578.3/km^{2}). The racial makeup of the CDP was 98.75% White, 0.31% African American, 0.31% Native American, 0.31% Asian, and 0.31% from two or more races. Hispanic or Latino of any race were 1.56% of the population.

There were 186 households, out of which 8.1% had children under the age of 18 living with them, 43.0% were married couples living together, 2.2% had a female householder with no husband present, and 52.2% were non-families. Of all households 41.4% were made up of individuals, and 19.4% had someone living alone who was 65 years of age or older. The average household size was 1.72 and the average family size was 2.25.

In the CDP, the population was spread out, with 7.2% under the age of 18, 2.2% from 18 to 24, 25.0% from 25 to 44, 33.1% from 45 to 64, and 32.5% who were 65 years of age or older. The median age was 53 years. For every 100 females, there were 107.8 males. For every 100 females age 18 and over, there were 110.6 males.

The median income for a household in the CDP was $26,739, and the median income for a family was $27,279. Males had a median income of $22,083 versus $27,059 for females. The per capita income for the CDP was $22,893. About 13.0% of families and 14.0% of the population were below the poverty line, including 28.1% of those under age 18 and 15.3% of those age 65 or over.
