= Bank of Everglades Building =

- U.S. National Register of Historic Places
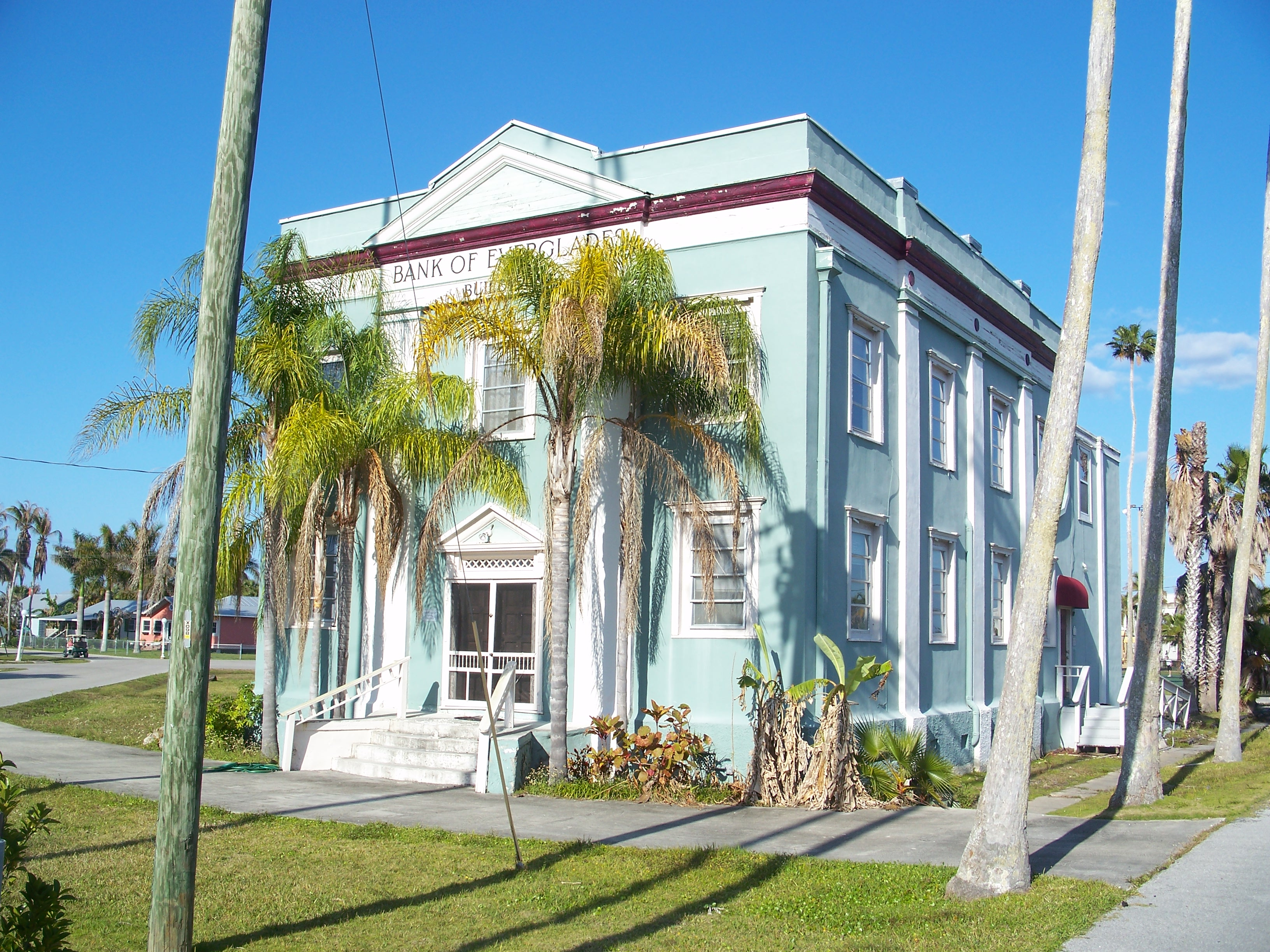

- Location within Florida Location within the United States
- Location: Everglades City, Florida
- Coordinates: 25.8577°N 81.3865°W
- Architectural style: Classical Revival
- NRHP reference No.: 99000825
- Added to NRHP: July 15, 1999

The Bank of Everglades Building is a building in Everglades City, Florida, United States, which originally housed a bank called the Bank of Everglades. It is located at 201 West Broadway. On July 15, 1999, it was added to the U.S. National Register of Historic Places.

== History ==
The Bank was founded by Barron Collier in 1923 when the new Collier County, Florida was established and moved into this edifice in 1927. The building was designed by William O. Sparklin who was also the architect of the Collier County Courthouse (now Everglades City Hall) and the Everglades Laundry (now the Museum of the Everglades).

The bank moved to Immokalee in 1962 after the county seat relocated to East Naples, and the building was used as a boarding house or bed and breakfast.

It is now being renovated by the Everglades Society for Historic Preservation.
