= Collier County Public Library =

Public library system in Florida, U.S.

Coordinates: 26.233686°N 81.770214°W

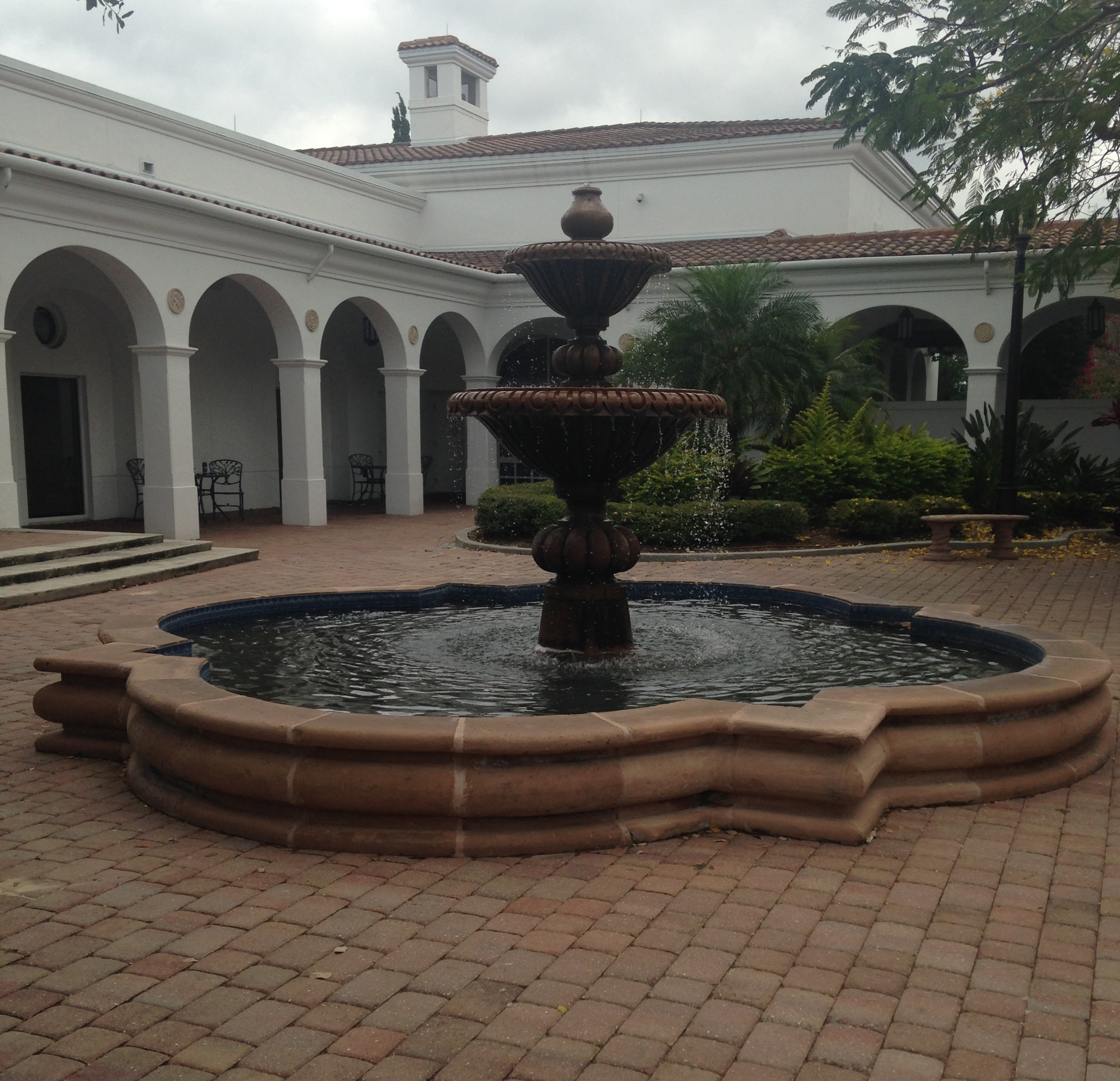
- Location: Naples, Florida, United States
- Type: Public
- Established: 1964
- Branches: 10

Collection
- Size: 639,882 volumes

Access and use
- Circulation: 2,700,000
- Population served: 397,994 (est. 2023)

Other information
- Budget: $7,089,800
- Director: Catherine Cowser
- Employees: c.100
- Website: collierlibrary.org

The Collier County Public Library (CCPL) is the public library system that serves Collier County in the U.S. state of Florida. It consists of 10 locations, including a headquarters library, two regional locations, and 7 branches distributed throughout the service area. CCPL has a print collection of approximately 640,000 volumes, in addition to providing e-resources, audio-visual materials, and programs.

== Structure ==
CCPL is governed by the Collier County Public Library Advisory Board, whose five members are appointed to four-year terms by the Board of County Commissioners. The Advisory Board establishes library policy and recommends courses of action for the future development of the library system. The library's director is Catherine Cowser.

The library's $7,089,000 budget primarily comes from taxes and impact fees. Additional funding support comes from the Collier County Friends of the Library, a nonprofit charitable organization whose mission is "to enhance and expand the educational, recreational and technological needs of the Collier County Public Library."

== Services ==
All Collier County residents and property owners may receive a free library card providing access to all library services and resources. County visitors and non-residents must pay $10 per month, or $100 per year, for library membership.

All CCPL locations offer public computers with Internet access, printing, photocopying, free Wi-Fi, and 24/7 dropboxes for book and DVD returns. Patrons can conduct research using library databases or borrow and download music, e-books, and audiobooks from the library's website. The book a librarian service allows patrons to have a one on one session with a librarian to assist with research, use of library resources, and technology. The Naples Regional Library maintains a Genealogy Room which is staffed by volunteers. The Headquarters Library houses CCPL's Mail-a-Book program which delivers books and other library materials directly to the homes of disabled or homebound patrons.

== History ==
The first library in Naples started in 1932 when the Naples Women's Club received a home as a gift. This home consisted of a book room with 141 books and was open to residents 3 pm to 5 pm Mondays to Fridays and 7:30 pm to 9:00 pm Monday evenings. This building remained in operation until 1951 when the Naples Women's Club relocated to the current location. In 1957, the Friends of the Library launched the Collier County Free Public Library in a room of the Women's Club. In order to meet the demands of the growing population of Collier County, bookmobiles were used for carrying books to remote towns of Immokalee, Marco Island, and Everglades City. In 1957, the Naples Chamber of Commerce sent a letter to the Collier County Commission suggesting that a proposed library system for Collier County be considered during upcoming budget hearings. The commission voted and the library system passed 4-1. which created the Collier County Free Public Library. In 1963, Ferdinand Lee purchased a block in downtown Naples and donated the land to the Collier County Friends of the Library, which later became the home of the library headquarters. However, it has since become the Naples Regional Branch and the county holds a 99-year lease on the land for $1 per year. The bookmobile service started in 1958 and ended in 1981 after the construction of local library branches. This first incarnation of CCPL contained only 10,000 volumes but in September, 1997 had 281,954 volumes. Over the years, the Collier County Public Libraries has grown to add three large regional libraries and seven local branches. The seventh branch located in Golden Gate Estates opened in January 1995.

== Friends of the Library ==
The Collier County Public Library owes its existence to the Friends of the Library because they were the group who opened the room in conjunction with the Women's club. Since 2001, the Friends have contributed over $1 million to meet the needs of the library. Their mission statement is, "To support Collier County Public Library; to obtain greater usefulness or wider use of library; and to support the literary and educational needs of the community through the Public Library." As of 2018, the Friends have around 2,700 members, who pay dues, and the organization is considered one of the largest non-profit organizations in Collier County. The Friends of the Library pay entirely for: "every public program in all library branches that requires out-of-pocket expenditures, Library Employee of the Month Recognition Programs, (and) library volunteer recognition programs." Aside from that, the Friends of the Library contribute to or provide for over eight other specific library services. The Friends entirely funded three separate construction projects: Rose Hall and Reading Patio at Marco Island Branch Library, Sugden Library Theater at the Orange Blossom Headquarters Library, and Sugden Reading Patio and Mackworth G. Rees Meeting Room at Naples Regional Library. Membership is $30 per individual or $40 for entire families.

== Mission statement ==
"To provide educational environments, facilitate community engagement and cultivate life-long learning."

== Locations ==
| Location | Address | Phone Number |
|---|---|---|
| East Naples | 8787 Tamiami Trail East, Naples, FL 34113 | 239-775-5592 |
| Estates | 1266 Golden Gate Blvd, W Naples, FL 34120 | 239-455-8088 |
| Everglades | 102 Copeland Ave, N Everglades City, FL 34139 | 239-695-2511 |
| Golden Gate | 2432 Lucerne Road, Naples, FL 34116 | 239-252-4542 |
| Headquarters | 2385 Orange Blossom Dr, Naples, FL 34109 | 239-593-3511 |
| Immokalee | 417 N First St, Immokalee, FL 34142 | 239-657-2882 |
| Marco Island | 210 S Heathwood Drive, Marco Island, FL 34145 | 239-394-3272 |
| Naples Regional | 650 Central Ave, Naples, FL 34102 | 239-252-5135 |
| South Regional | 8065 Lely Cultural Pkwy Naples, FL 34113 | 239-252-7542 |
| Vanderbilt Beach | 788 Vanderbilt Beach Rd, Naples, FL 34108 | 239-597-8444 |

== Hours by location ==
| Location | Monday | Tuesday | Wednesday | Thursday | Friday | Saturday | Sunday |
|---|---|---|---|---|---|---|---|
| East Naples | Closed | 9:00-6:00 | 9:00-6:00 | 9:00-6:00 | 9:00-5:00 | 9:00-5:00 | Closed |
| Estates | 10:00-6:00 | 10:00-6:00 | 10:00-6:00 | 10:00-6:00 | 9:00-5:00 | 9:00-5:00 | Closed |
| Everglades City | 9:00-12:00; 1:00-4:30 | 9:00-12:00; 1:00-4:30 | 9:00-12:00; 1:00-4:30 | 9:00-12:00; 1:00-4:30 | 9:00-12:00; 1:00-4:30 | Closed | Closed |
| Golden Gate | 10:00-6:00 | 10:00-6:00 | 10:00-6:00 | 10:00-6:00 | 9:00-5:00 | 9:00-5:00 | Closed |
| Headquarters | 9:00-8:00 | 9:00-8:00 | 9:00-8:00 | 9:00-8:00 | 9:00-5:00 | 9:00-5:00 | Closed |
| Immokalee | Closed | 9:00-6:00 | 9:00-6:00 | 9:00-6:00 | 9:00-5:00 | 9:00-5:00 | Closed |
| Marco Island | 10:00-6:00 | 10:00-6:00 | 10:00-6:00 | 10:00-6:00 | 9:00-5:00 | 9:00-5:00 | Closed |
| Naples Regional | 9:00-8:00 | 9:00-8:00 | 9:00-8:00 | 9:00-8:00 | 9:00-5:00 | 9:00-5:00 | Closed |
| South Regional | 9:00-8:00 | 9:00-8:00 | 9:00-8:00 | 9:00-8:00 | 9:00-5:00 | 9:00-5:00 | Closed |
| Vanderbilt Beach | Closed | 10:00-6:00 | 10:00-6:00 | 10:00-6:00 | 9:00-5:00 | 9:00-5:00 | Closed |
