= Aubrey Rogers High School =

School in Naples, Florida

Location
- 15100 Patriot Place, Naples, Florida, US
- Coordinates: 26°18.0131′N 81°47.2143′W

Information
- School type: Comprehensive public high school
- Motto: The Patriot Way
- Opened: 2023
- School district: District School Board of Collier County
- NCES School ID: 120033008975
- Principal: Jessie Garcia
- Teaching staff: 60.01 (2024-2025)
- Grades: 9-12
- Enrollment: 1,496 (2024-2025)
- Student to teacher ratio: 24.93
- Colors: Red, White, Blue
- Mascot: Patriots
- Website: arh.collierschools.com

Aubrey Rogers High School is a four-year public high school located in North Naples, Florida, United States. It is down Veterans Memorial Boulevard, which is also where Veterans Memorial Elementary School resides.

Aubrey Rogers High School is the most recent construction of a high school in Collier County since the openings of Golden Gate High School and Palmetto Ridge High School in 2004. The school officially commenced academic operations starting in the 2023–2024 school year.

== History ==
The 60-acre property that would later be the building grounds for Aubrey Rogers High was bought in 2001, but plans to construct the school didn't begin until 2019, when the District School Board of Collier County selected Zyscovich Architects to build the school. The design was developed through 2019 and finished in July 2020. On November 8, 2021, the official groundbreaking ceremony was held, attended by district leadership and community stakeholders.

The selection of the school's name was the result of a community-driven process governed by the School Board of Collier County. Following the purchase of the land in 2001 and the revitalization of the construction project in 2019, the naming committee sought a moniker that would reflect the values of the community and honor a significant local contributor. On September 12, 2022, during a Regular School Board Meeting, the board voted to honor former Sheriff Aubrey Rogers. The school's inaugural opening was on August 10, 2023.

== Athletics ==
Aubrey Rogers High School is the newest member of the Collier County Athletic Conference. The school's athletic teams are known as the Patriots and compete in the Florida High School Athletic Association.

Fall sports include:

- Football
- Boys and Girls Cross Country
- Boys and Girls Golf
- Swimming and Diving
- Girls Volleyball

Winter sports include:

- Boys Basketball
- Girls Basketball
- Boys Soccer
- Girls Soccer
- Wrestling
- Girls Weightlifting

Spring sports include:

- Baseball
- Softball
- Tennis
- Track and Field
- Boys Lacrosse
- Girls Lacrosse
- Beach Volleyball

== Recognition ==
- Recognized as an 'A-rated' school by the FLDOE.
