= Bayside Marketplace =

Entertainment complex in Miami, Florida, U.S.

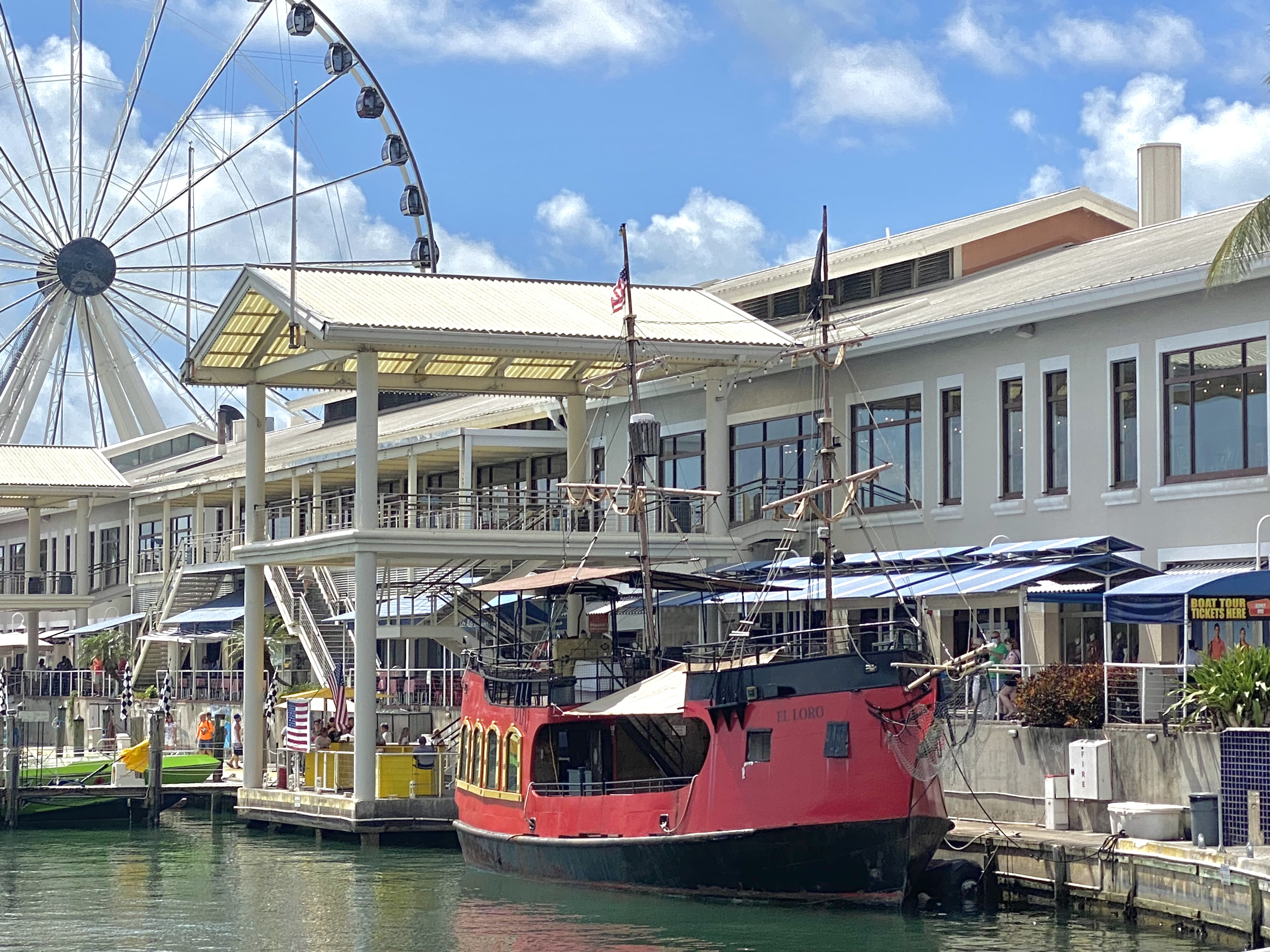
- Exterior view with the Skyviews Miami Observation Wheel in the background (June 2021)
- Location: Miami, Florida, U.S.
- Coordinates: 25.77831°N 80.186452°W
- Address: 401 Biscayne Blvd, 33132
- Opened: April 8, 1987; 39 years ago
- Renovated: October 2016 – November 2018
- Developer: The Rouse Company
- Manager: Ashkenazy Acquisition Corporation Realty; CBRE Group
- Owner: Ashkenazy Acquisition Corporation (Bayside Marketplace); City of Miami (land)
- Architect: Benjamin Thompson and Associates, Inc.; Spillis, Candela & Partners
- Floor area: 370,000 square feet (34,000 m^{2})
- Floors: 2 in both pavilions
- Parking: Parking lot / Parking garage
- Website: baysidemarketplace.com
- Building details
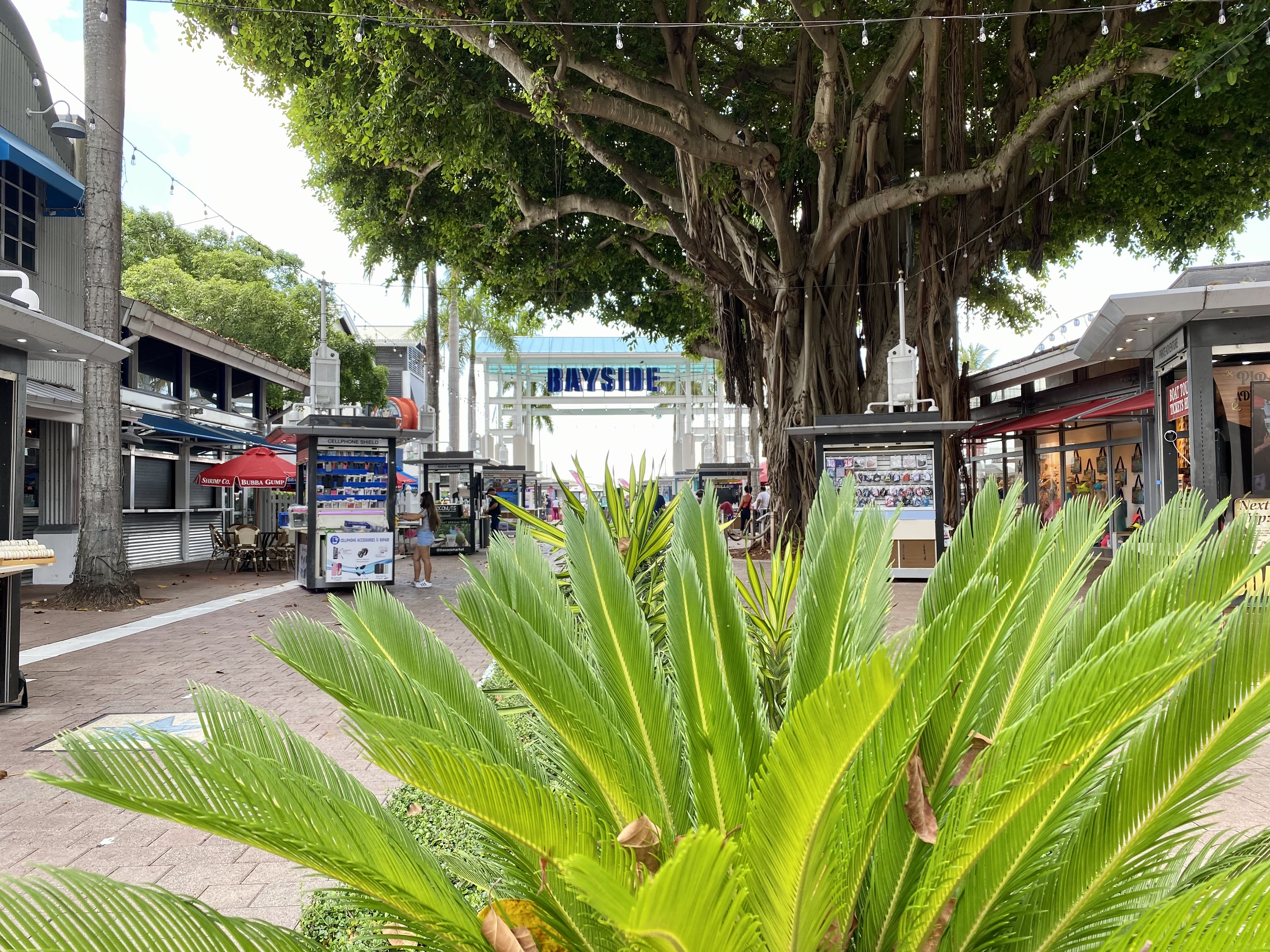
- Main entrance (June 2021)

General information
- Status: Operational
- Type: Festival marketplace (1987–2016); Shopping mall (2018–present); Entertainment complex (1987–present)

Design and construction
- Main contractor: HCB Contractors

Renovating team
- Architect: Zyscovich Architects
- Renovating firm: Ashkenazy Acquisition Corporation (2016–2018); General Growth Properties (2016–2017)

Bayside Marketplace (or simply Bayside) is an open-air shopping center and entertainment complex in Greater Downtown Miami, Florida, United States consisting of two retail structures: North Pavilion and South Pavilion. The complex is situated on the banks of Biscayne Bay, with the City of Miami marina on one side. It was developed by the Rouse Company, a Columbia, Maryland-based real estate developer.

The mall opened in April 1987 as a festival marketplace intended to save the city, initially featuring local businesses. As of September 2017, Bayside is owned and managed by the Ashkenazy Acquisition Corporation. After Bayside completed its renovations in November 2018, later additions included the Skyviews Miami Observation Wheel, alongside the PIER 5 nightclub venue, which opened in January 2024, featuring free live musical acts, cultural performances, and DJs frequently, alongside the flagship Rum Bar, and Black Market Miami on the second floor, replacing Hooters. Being adjacent to PortMiami has solidified the mall's status as a tourist attraction. The mall originally featured a flagship Hard Rock Cafe from September 1993 until its permanent closure in August 2026.

== History ==
=== Background ===
Interior view prior to renovations (October 2012)

In the 1970s and 1980s, Greater Downtown Miami experienced a significant decline characterized by high levels of crime, drug-related violence, and economic stagnation, leading to the city's infamous national reputation as a troubled and dangerous urban area. This heavy period of urban decay tempted city officials to initiate numerous revitalization efforts aimed at transforming the waterfront, restoring economic vitality to the core business district, and reversing Miami's character as a dangerous city. After World War II, people also began moving to the suburbs, wanting enclosed shopping centers over traditional local department stores. The bad state of Miami was encapsulated in the influential hit TV show Miami Vice, which ran from 1984 to 1990.

=== 1983–1987: Development and opening ===
At night, pre-renovation (May 2011)

The Rouse Company of Columbia, Maryland formed the Florida-based subsidiary Bayside Entertainment Company and began plans for Bayside Marketplace in 1983. The company selected the site, along 16 acres (6.5 ha) of land near downtown Miami facing Biscayne Bay, to develop a festival marketplace shopping center, as akin to their successful flagships of the same model being Harborplace in Baltimore and Faneuil Hall Marketplace in Boston. Development had key involvement from city officials including then-mayor Xavier Suarez. The project cost $93 million.

Bayside Marketplace had its grand opening on April 8, 1987, aiming to turn Miami into a tourist attraction. The marketplace was designed by Benjamin C. Thompson of Massachusetts as an open-air shopping center, mimicking the appearance of historical market sheds. Upon opening, it consisted of about 235,000 square feet (21,800 m^{2}) of retail shops and restaurants between two different buildings, in addition to opening out to a marina called the Miamarina. The project was estimated upon opening to generate about 1,200 jobs in the Miami area. The grand opening celebration featured live performances by the New World Pops Orchestra conducted by Peter Graves, a fireworks display, and a boat parade on Biscayne Bay.

It included a mix of retail and souvenir stores, restaurants, 77 minority-owned businesses, and also included a space that featured local musical acts, and a food court on the second floor. Bayside Marketplace attracted over 12 million visitors in its first year of operation. However, the mall eventually fell $18 million short in sales and two million visitors short once the novelty wore off.

=== 1990–1997: Early years ===
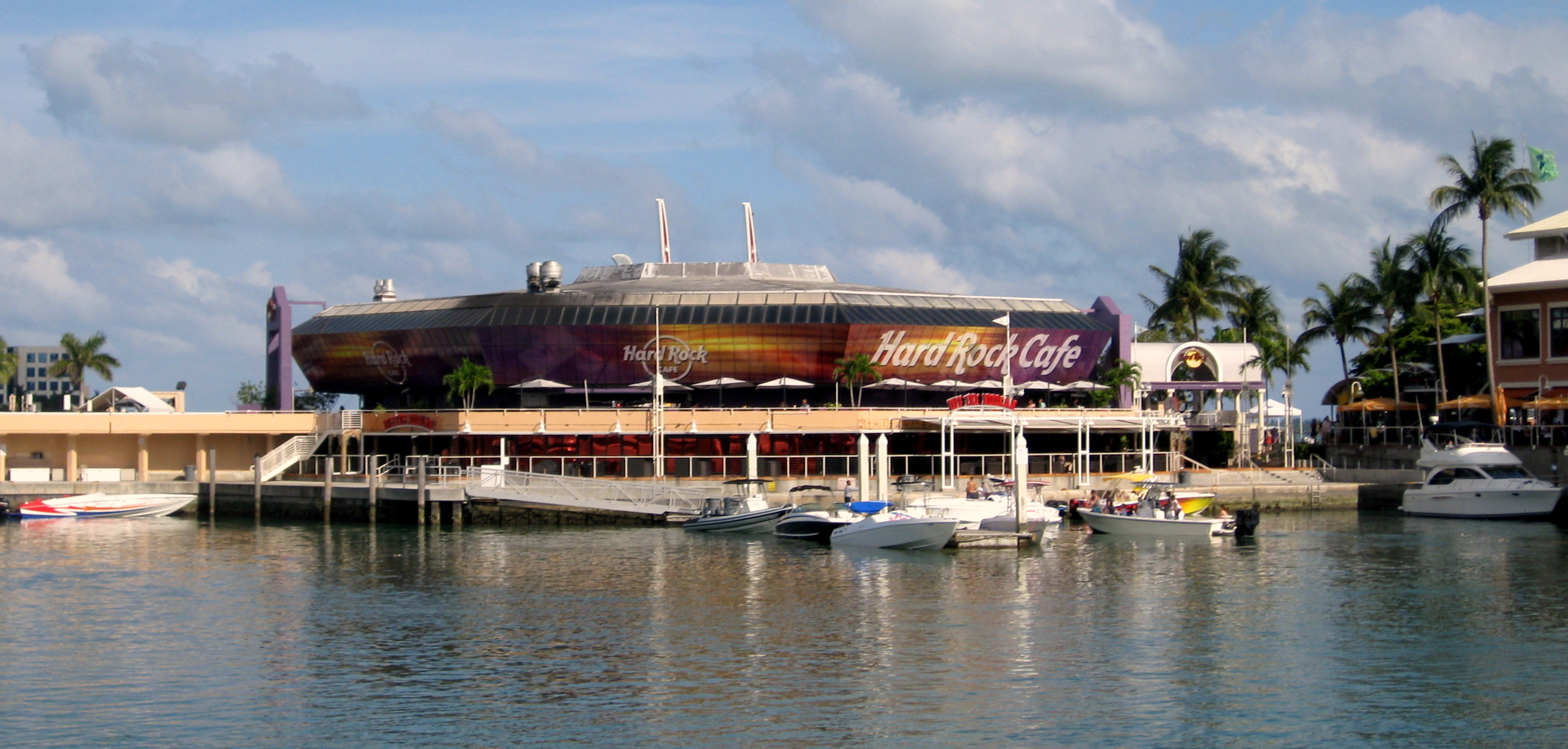
Hard Rock Cafe (April 2013)

The Rouse Company began shifting from locally owned businesses to national chains for financial reasons, and to boost traffic in the early 1990s. Wet Seal, looking to expand into the East Coast, would open at Bayside Marketplace in August 1990. Gap would open a 6,285 sq ft (583.9 m^{2}) location in the former Exit Store space in August 1991.

Hard Rock Cafe would have its grand opening celebration on September 21, 1993, featuring a massive guitar attached to its roof, numerous palm trees, and memorabilia from Elvis Presley. The restaurant would operate in the former Reflections space.

=== 1997–2012: General Growth Properties (GGP) acquisition ===
The new "mesh-metal" guitar sign on the roof of Hard Rock Cafe Miami in December 2021.

Tenth-anniversary festivities in 1997 included several concerts and tall ship arrivals, as well as a fireworks show. Bubba Gump Shrimp Co. would open at the complex in early March 1999. In the early 21st century, proposals were given by Miami-Dade County to link the mall to American Airlines Arena (now Kaseya Center) with a pedestrian bridge. By July 1, 2003, the plans had been modified to instead include a street-level crosswalk, as well as a public park adjacent to the arena.

The Rouse Company and its assets, including Bayside Marketplace, were acquired by the Chicago, Illinois-based General Growth Properties (GGP) in November 2004 for $12.6 billion. After Hurricane Wilma severely damaged the guitar on the top of the mall's Hard Rock Cafe on October 24, 2005, it was completely dismantled and removed from the structure, making it one of the only Hard Rock Cafes in the world without a rooftop guitar. Due to the Great Recession, Bayside Marketplace was so financially strapped that the City of Miami had to allow the mall to pay only half of its unpaid lease revenues by December 2008.

On March 2, 2009, GGP put Bayside up for sale to raise money, before ultimately filing for Chapter 11 bankruptcy on April 16 of that year. By late January 2011, Largo Seafood & Grill opened in November 2010, alongside Del Sol, Subway, and Five Guys Burgers and Fries in December. Fat Tuesday relocated next to Hooters. On May 10, 2012, Mozzarella Grill, The Knife, Lombardi's Ristorante, Brawy Seafood, Kelly's Cajun Grill, Mambo Cafe, Latin American Cafeteria, and Che Pasta, which were all restaurants in the South Pavilion, were forced to close temporarily after health inspectors found rodent infestations. They reopened the following day, with Mambo Cafe and Latin American Cafe having the most violations.

=== 2013–2019: Decline and renovation ===
In December 2014, the New York-based Ashkenazy Acquisition Corporation acquired 49% of Bayside Marketplace's equity shares from GGP, and took over mall management, which went into effect on January 1, 2015. The property was supported by a $250 million mortgage fund specifically tied to execution phases for structural renovations and expansions. Shortly after taking over management, Ashkenazy and GGP immediately and aggressively evicted roughly 40 long-term tenants.

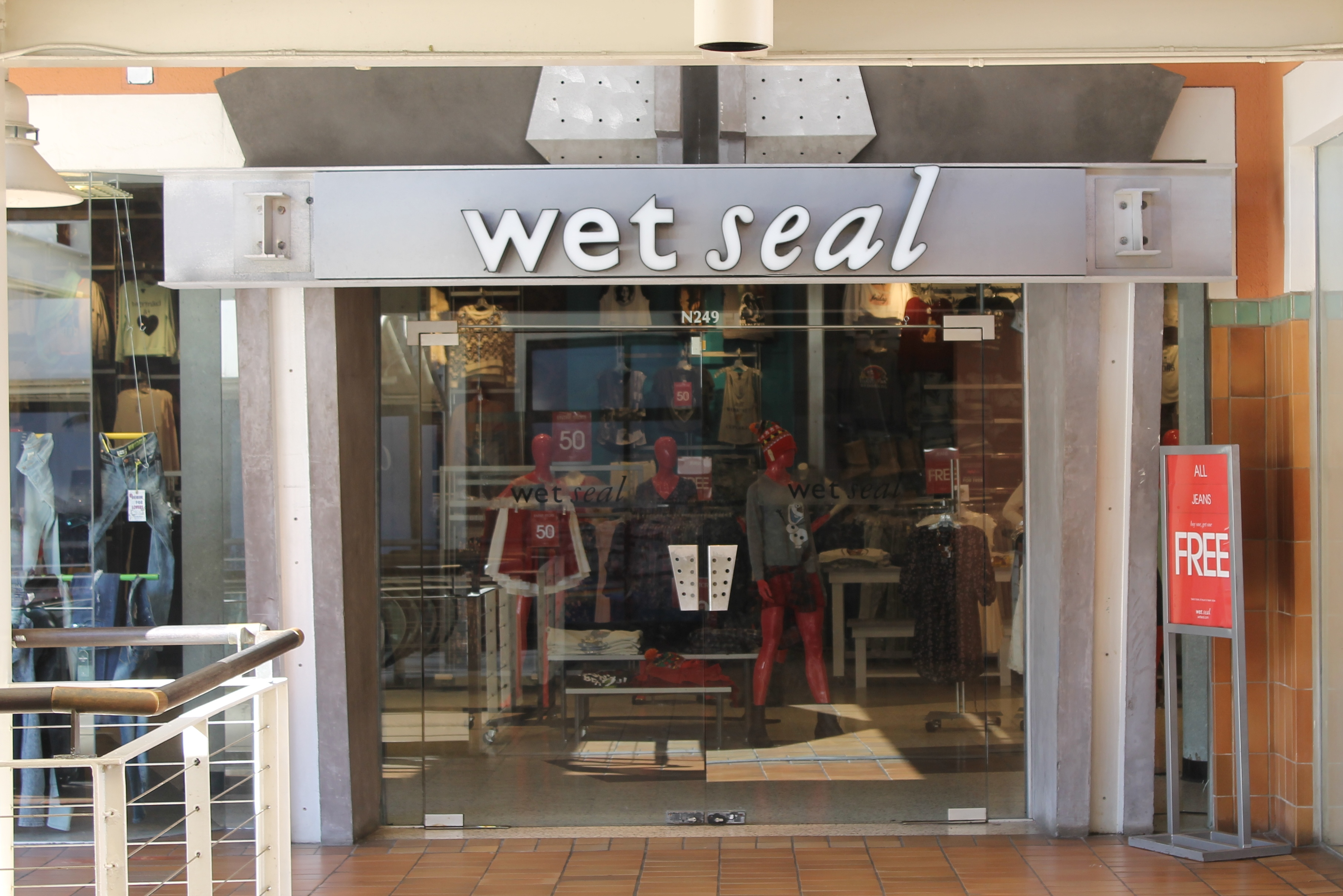
Entrance to Wet Seal in January 2015. It closed its doors in January 2017, following the full liquidation of the brand after filing for Chapter 11 bankruptcy. It was later replaced by Rainbow Shops.

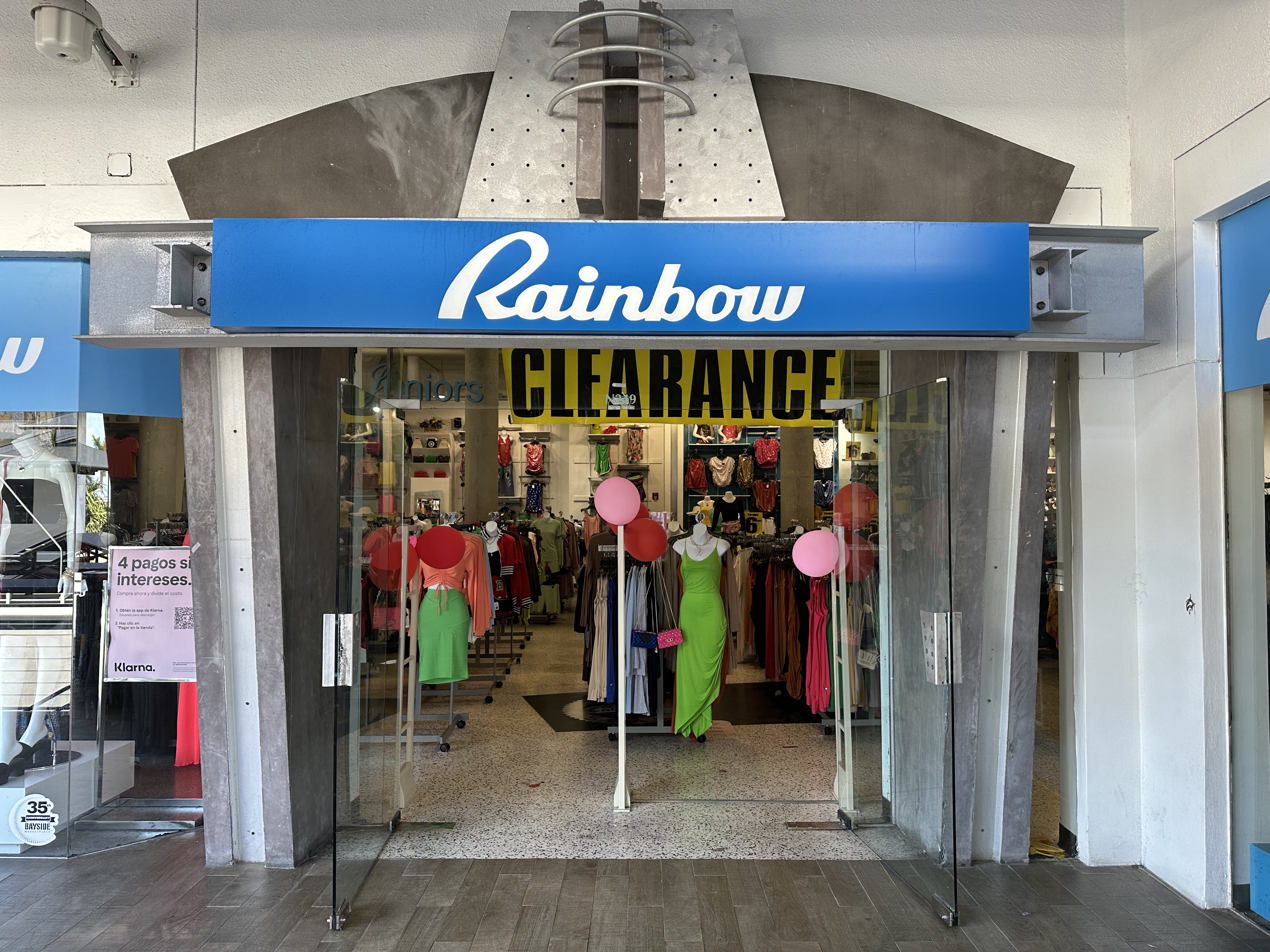
Rainbow Shops (February 2023)

The mass evictions caused Bayside Marketplace's once-bustling food court to lose popular eateries. It also failed to compete with new, modern competitors, such as the Miami Design District and Brickell City Centre. It was also seen as a tourist trap because it was seen as catering to cruise ship visitors and suburban visitors, which discouraged local repeat business. Plans for the nearby SkyRise Miami entertainment tower was cancelled because it faced legal challenges and funding issues, which resulted in the site where it was planned to be constructed on as a "wasteland."

It was announced in October 2014 that the mall would undergo a $27 million renovation by Ashkenazy and GGP, designed by the local architectural firm Zyscovich Architecture. Senior general manager Pam Weller made a deal that would allow 17,000 square feet (1,600 m^{2}) of retail space and parking garages to be added to Bayside Marketplace, alongside investing in up to $35 million in renovations, which was approved in August of that year.

An official launch ceremony was held on September 14, 2016, and construction began in October of that year. The renovations gave the mall a fresh and more modern look, through a brighter paint scheme, hurricane-resistant polyurethane roofs with LED lighting, a revamped tenant mix, and general modernization. GGP also increased its mortgage for the renovation from $79 million to $250 million.

==== Neglect, maintenance issues, and eviction lawsuits (GGP and Ashkenazy) ====
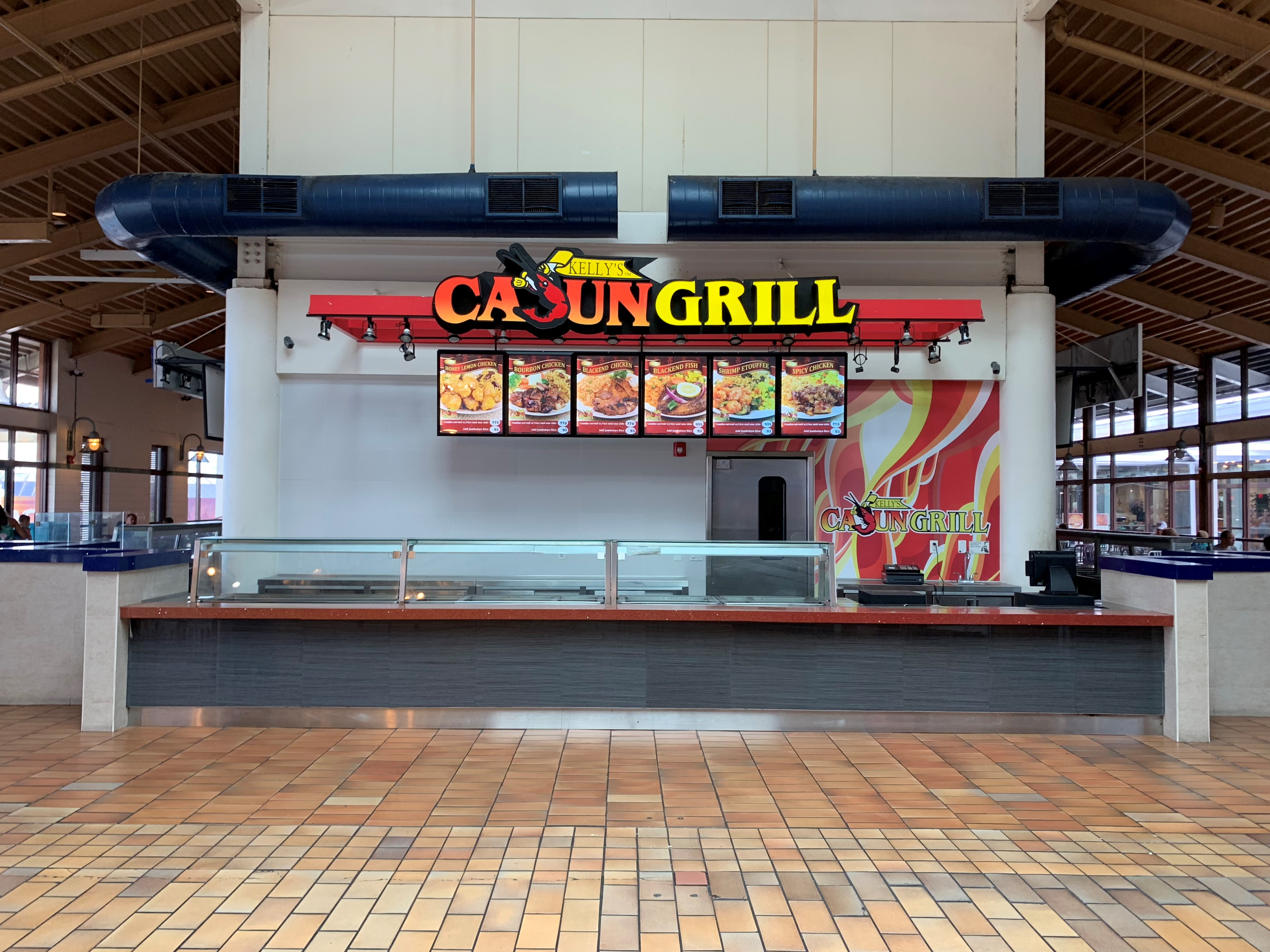
Kelly's Cajun Grill after closure (September 2018)

On July 22, 2016, Fat Tuesday sued Bayside Marketplace LLC (a legal affiliate of GGP and Ashkenazy), claiming that they manufactured fake "cleanliness defaults" as leverage to increase their rent and force a relocation. As of November 2017, a GGP spokesperson revealed that the company no longer holds a stake in Bayside. By then, tenants were filing lawsuits against Ashkenazy for evictions and neglect between September 2016 and September 2017, including Miami Waves, which countersued them and Bayside Marketplace LLC in the Miami-Dade Circuit Court on September 5, 2017, for using "improper and outrageous" tactics to force out local and regional retailers in favor of national brands. Bayside won the lawsuit on October 4. Sportive II accused the owners of trying to make them pay rent for a space that has been vacant for at least three years.

On October 8, 2013, Maki's Place signed a lease to open a 671 sq ft (62.3 m^{2}) sushi bar in Bayside Marketplace, but its opening was delayed by two years due to the renovations, leading to them to also file a counterclaim on March 15, stating that Bayside "only provided [them] 595 square feet (55.3 m^{2})", decreasing the restaurant's seating capacity "by 35%." This ultimately made them close in November 2016. Kelly's Cajun Grill and Yeung's Lotus Express complained that the mall did not provide $100,000 in construction allowance, failing to repair or provide restrooms, HVAC, and 30-year-old seating (which allowed homeless people to use them). On April 16, 2018, Ashkenazy filed even more lawsuits at Claire's and Envy for failing to leave by the January 2017 deadline, and to Splash Perfumes and I Luv Miami for allegedly failing to pay rent.

By April 16, 2019, the affected restaurants retaliated at Ashkenazy, filing a countersuit by collaborating to form IRMG of Bayside, Inc. On March 27 of that year, Miami-Dade Judge Alexander Boker rejected Bayside's attempt to dismiss the lawsuits filed by the evicted businesses. Gusto Pizzeria and Tango Grill also sued when Ashkenazy tried to evict them. The plaintiffs accused GGP (now owned by Brookfield Properties as of August 2018) and Ashkenazy Acquisition Corp. for breach of contract (including broken promises during the renovation), and deteriorating conditions, including broken escalators and the exacerbation of HVAC failures.

=== 2020s–present: Alien assumptions ===
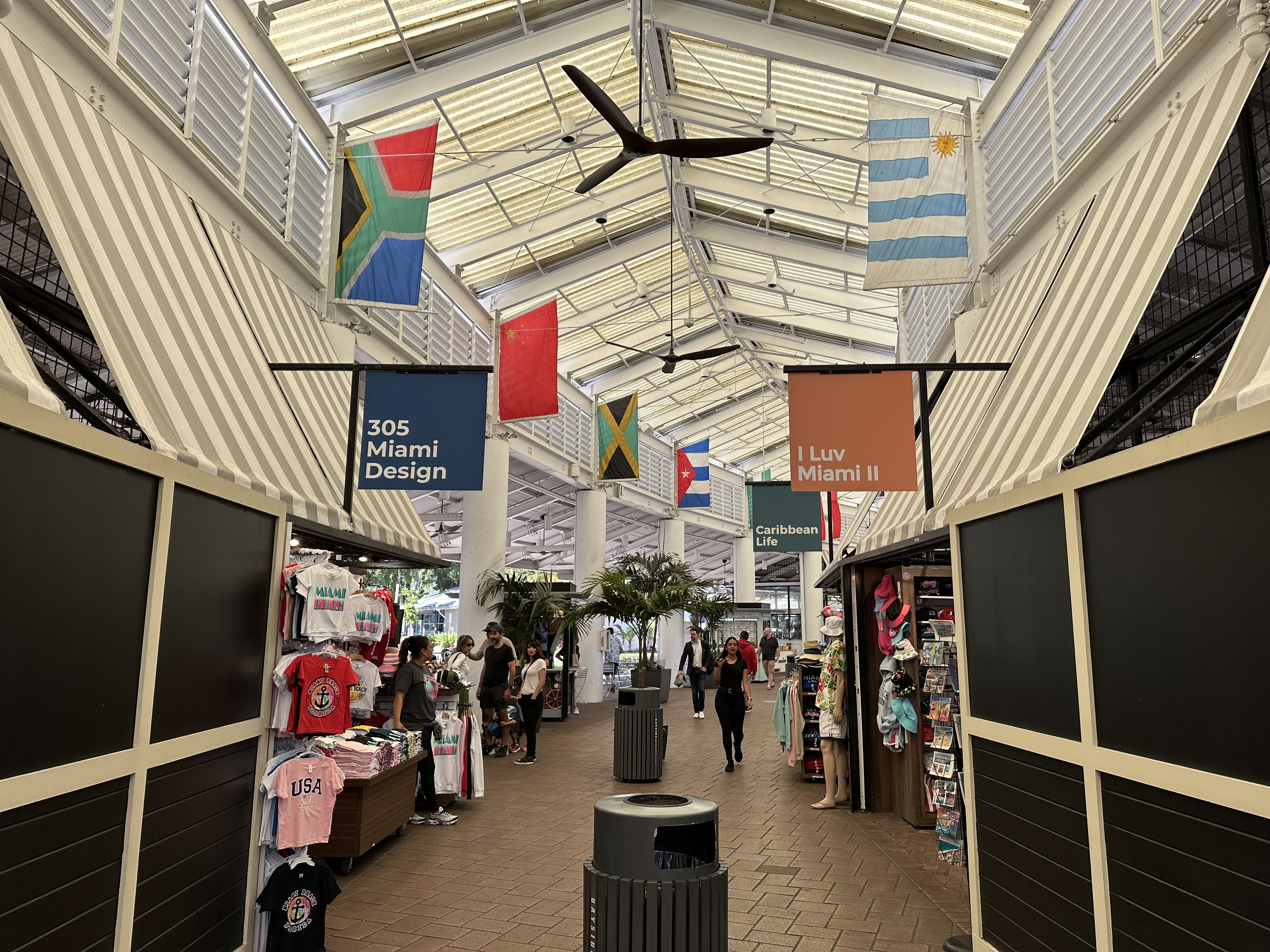
First-floor curved concourse after renovations (February 2023)

Although the COVID-19 pandemic caused temporary tenant closures and social distancing restrictions to be implemented, including the permanent closure of the Hooters restaurant on March 17, 2020, Bayside Marketplace continued to expand, including the opening of Jimmy Buffett's LandShark Bar & Grill on July 6, 2020, and the addition of the Skyviews Miami Observation Wheel, which opened on October 28, 2020, towering 200 feet above the mall with 42 climate-controlled gondolas offering panoramic views of Biscayne Bay and the downtown skyline. IT'SUGAR had a presence at Bayside during this period. Besides Hooters, Bayside Marketplace lost six additional tenants during the pandemic, including Sun & Sea Brazilian Bikinis.

==== Neglect, maintenance issues, and eviction lawsuits (continued) ====
On July 8, 2020, Ashkenazy filed eviction lawsuits against Hard Rock Cafe, which owed $337,912, (Note: The Real Deal, the source used in the citation to support this claim, cites that Hard Rock Cafe has been at Bayside since 1992, even though it opened in 1993.) Shoe Palace, which has been a tenant since 2017 and owed $131,801, U.S. Polo Assn., which owed $120,594 and has been a tenant since 2014, Bubba Gump Shrimp Co., which owed $107,280, and Express, which has been a tenant since 2013 and owed $105,245. Landry's, Inc., the parent company of Bubba Gump, slammed the eviction filing as "unreasonable", arguing that trying to kick out businesses for an unprecedented global pandemic was "bad-faith management." The eviction lawsuit with HRC was officially dismissed with prejudice in 2022.

The former Hooters restaurant space was replaced by Black Market Miami, which would open in May 2021. A 190–foot–tall Ferris wheel was added near Bayside in the spring of 2022 to celebrate its 35-year anniversary. On January 1, 2024, a large police presence arrived at the mall after reports of teenagers causing a disturbance including fighting and lighting fireworks. The scale of police presence which responded to the incident spawned conspiracy theories (such as Bayside Marketplace being "attacked by aliens") which police denied. Videos of alleged "giant extraterrestrials" around the mall were identified as being merely several police officers walking with their shadow.

Ben Ashkenazy formed a joint venture with Breakwater Hospitality Group, the company behind The Wharf and Regatta Grove. The joint venture would allow the development of the PIER 5 entertainment venue, with architect Saladino Design Studios being hired. They gutted the center of the marketplace plaza and built an open-air ship-inspired layout, featuring maritime tribute flooring, and flagship bars, with the help of Erick Passo, the co-owner of the sports bar staple Black Market Miami, to ensure the venue resonated deeply with local Miamians rather than just out-of-town travelers. A soft opening was held on December 26, 2023, and a four-day grand opening weekend, with an official ribbon-cutting ceremony and an exclusive VIP preview night, took place from January 11 to 14, 2024, featuring the flagship Rum Bar.

On April 16, 2024, IT'SUGAR opened a massive, new 16,000 square feet (1,500 m^{2}) two-story flagship at Bayside Marketplace, featuring a lollipop garden, and the Oreo Café, colloquially referred to as a "candy department store," branded IT'SUGAR Mega Flagship.

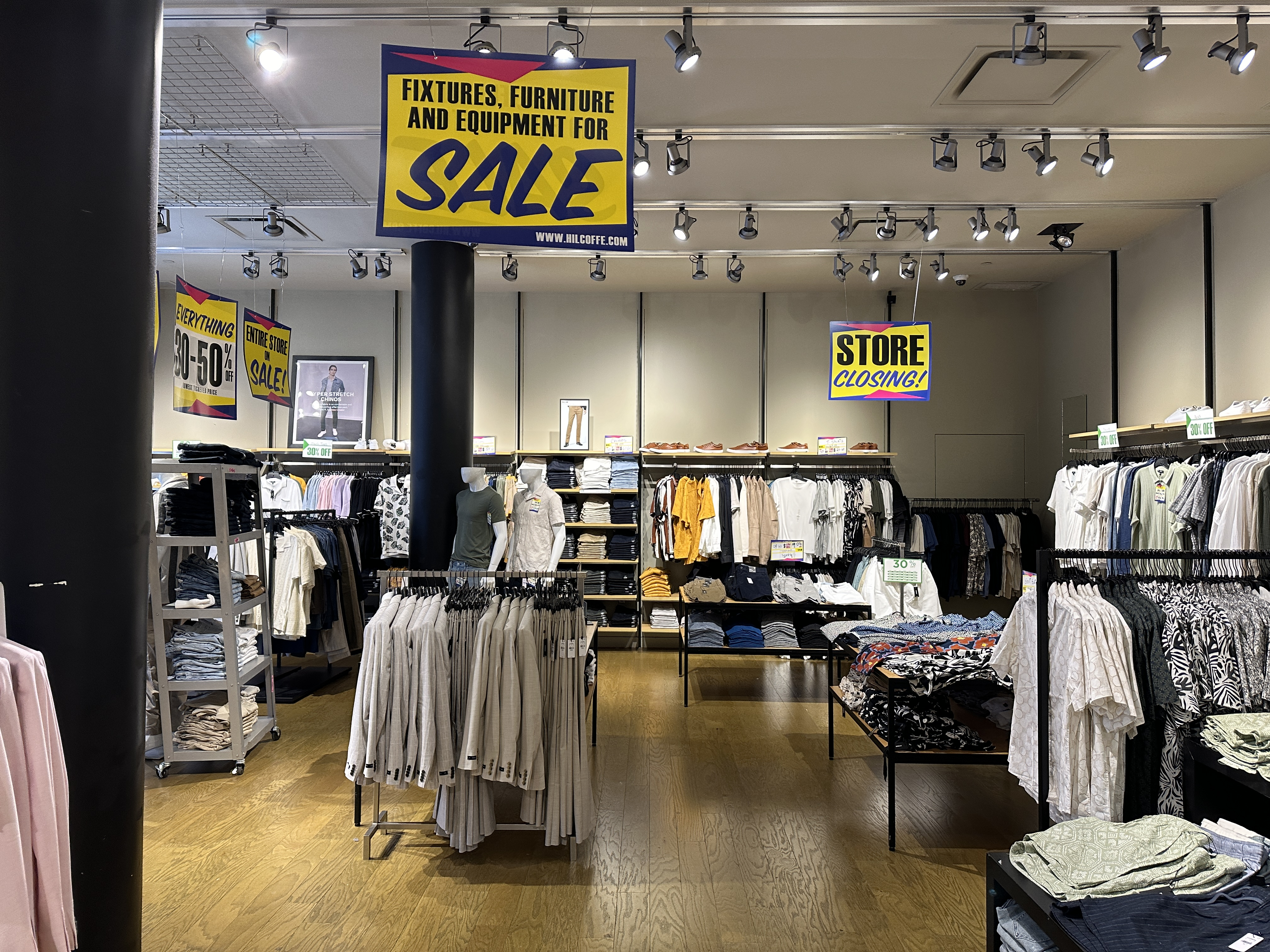
Interior view of Express going out of business (May 2024)

Express liquidated and closed its Bayside store in May 2024, alongside 14 other stores, after filing for Chapter 11 bankruptcy in April 2024. Local Mexican restaurant COYO Taco opened a 4,473 sq ft (415.6 m^{2}) flagship at the complex on May 26, 2026.

On June 22, 2026, parent company Hard Rock International announced that Hard Rock Cafe would be permanently close its doors on August 19, 2026, because its lease expired and was not renewed, affecting 117 jobs; they were also redirecting visitors to go to the Seminole Hard Rock Hotel & Casino Hollywood in the Greater Fort Lauderdale area if they want to eat at HRC.

== Gallery ==
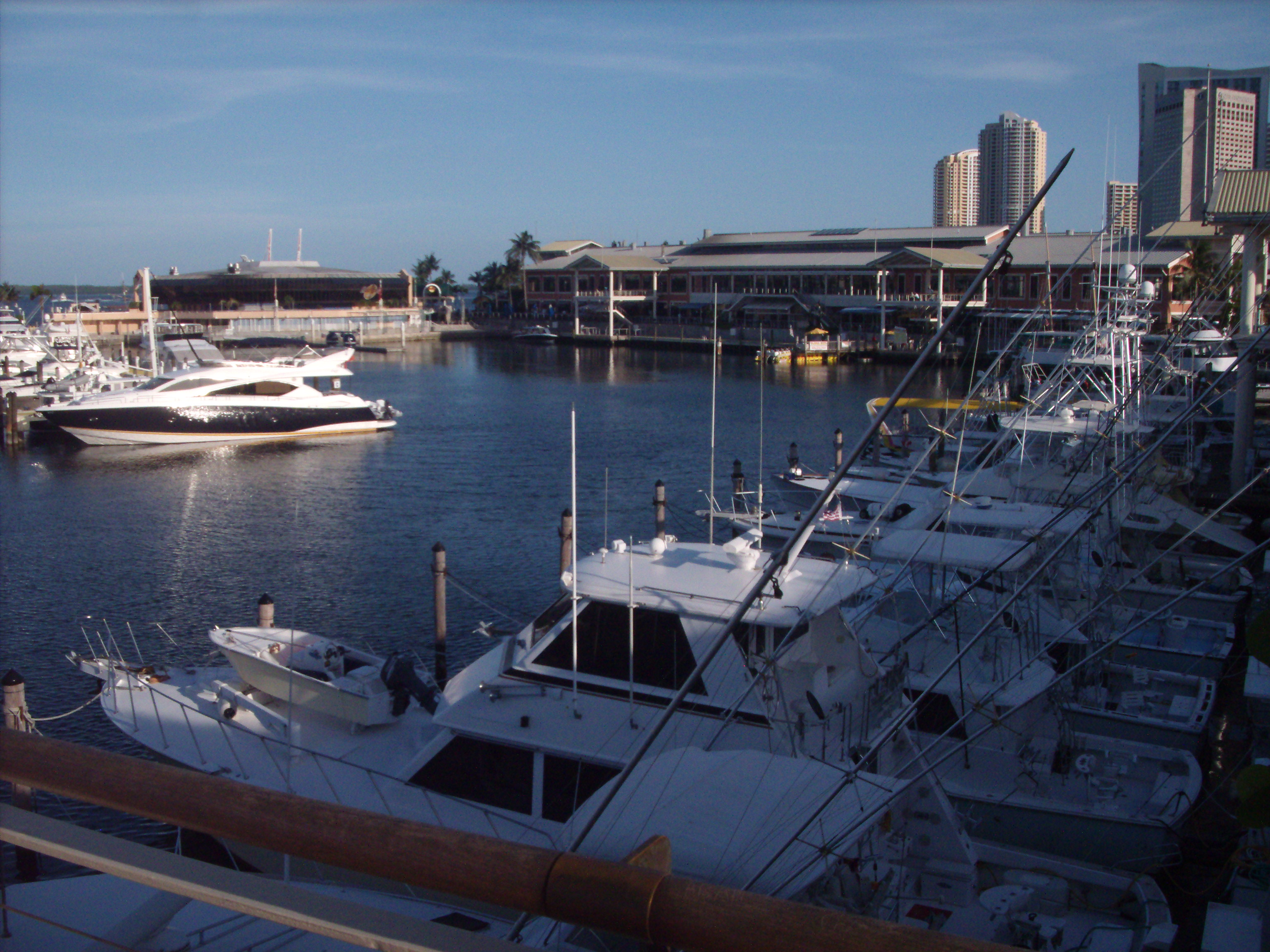
Bayside Marketplace from north looking south (food court near the middle and Hard Rock Cafe on the left, July 2010)

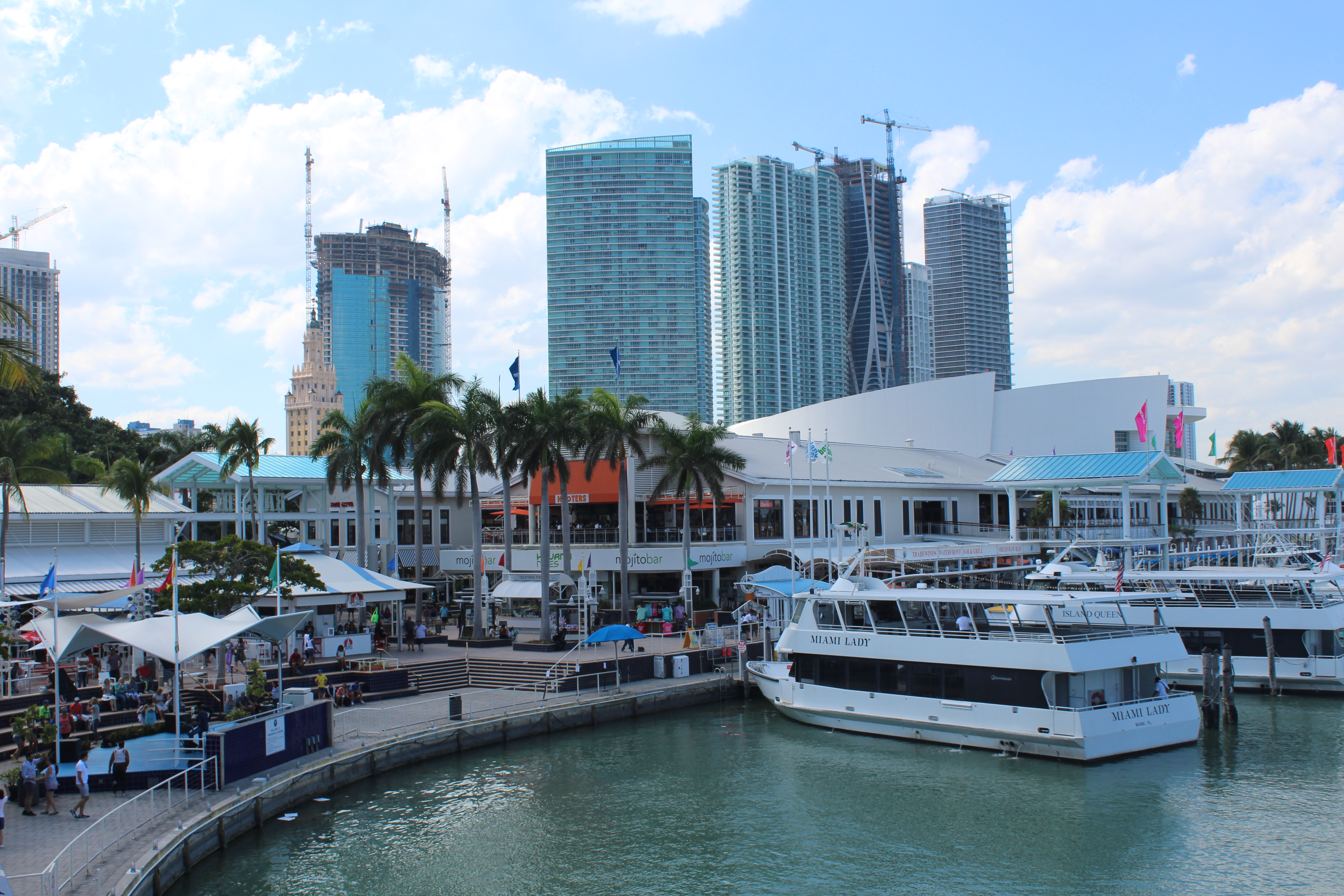
Bayside from south looking north (April 2018)

LandShark Bar & Grill (May 2023)

Five Guys (February 2023)

Concourse pre-renovation (October 2012)

Hooters (March 2019)

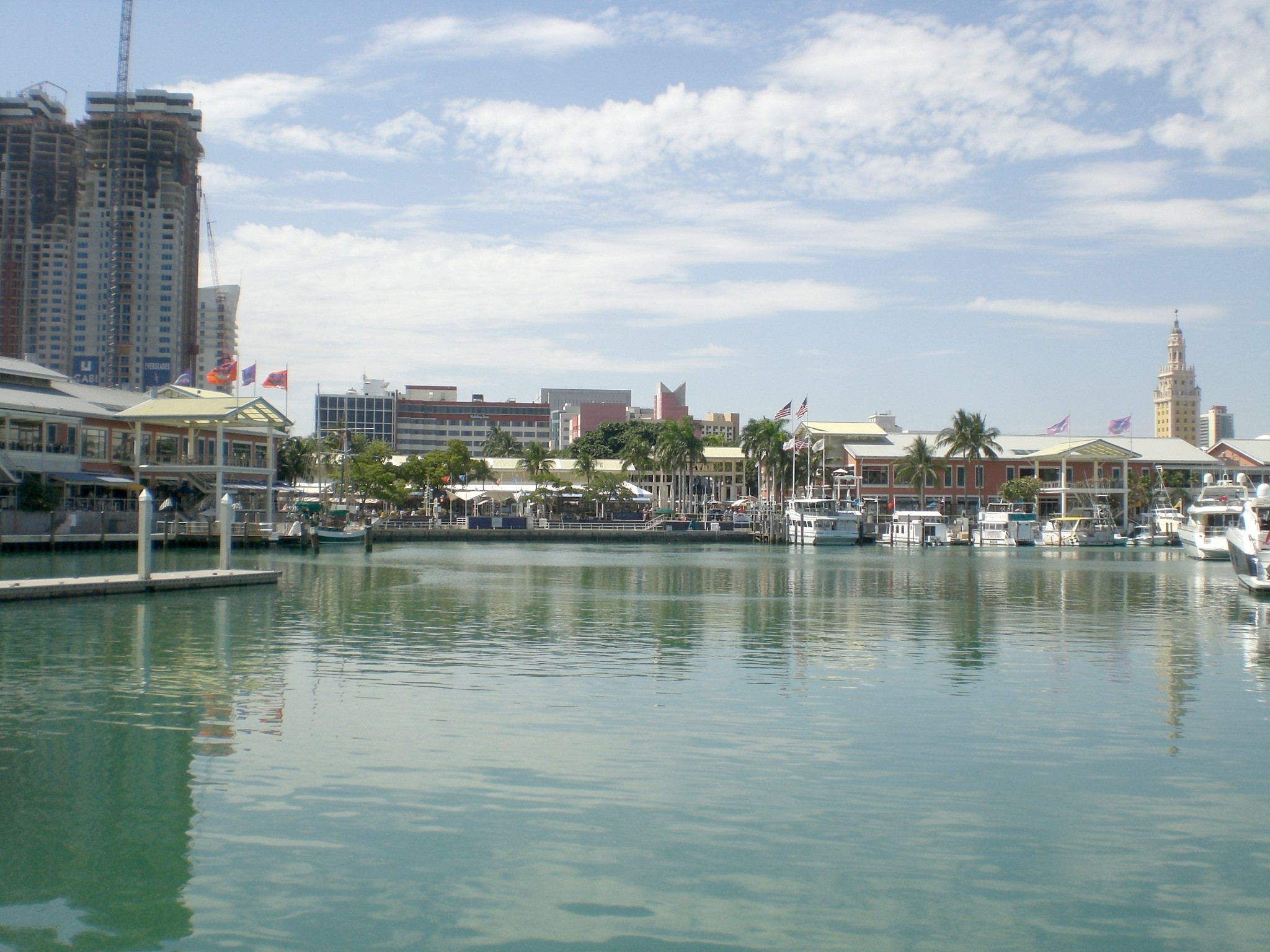
Bayside as seen from the east looking west on Biscayne Bay (March 2007)

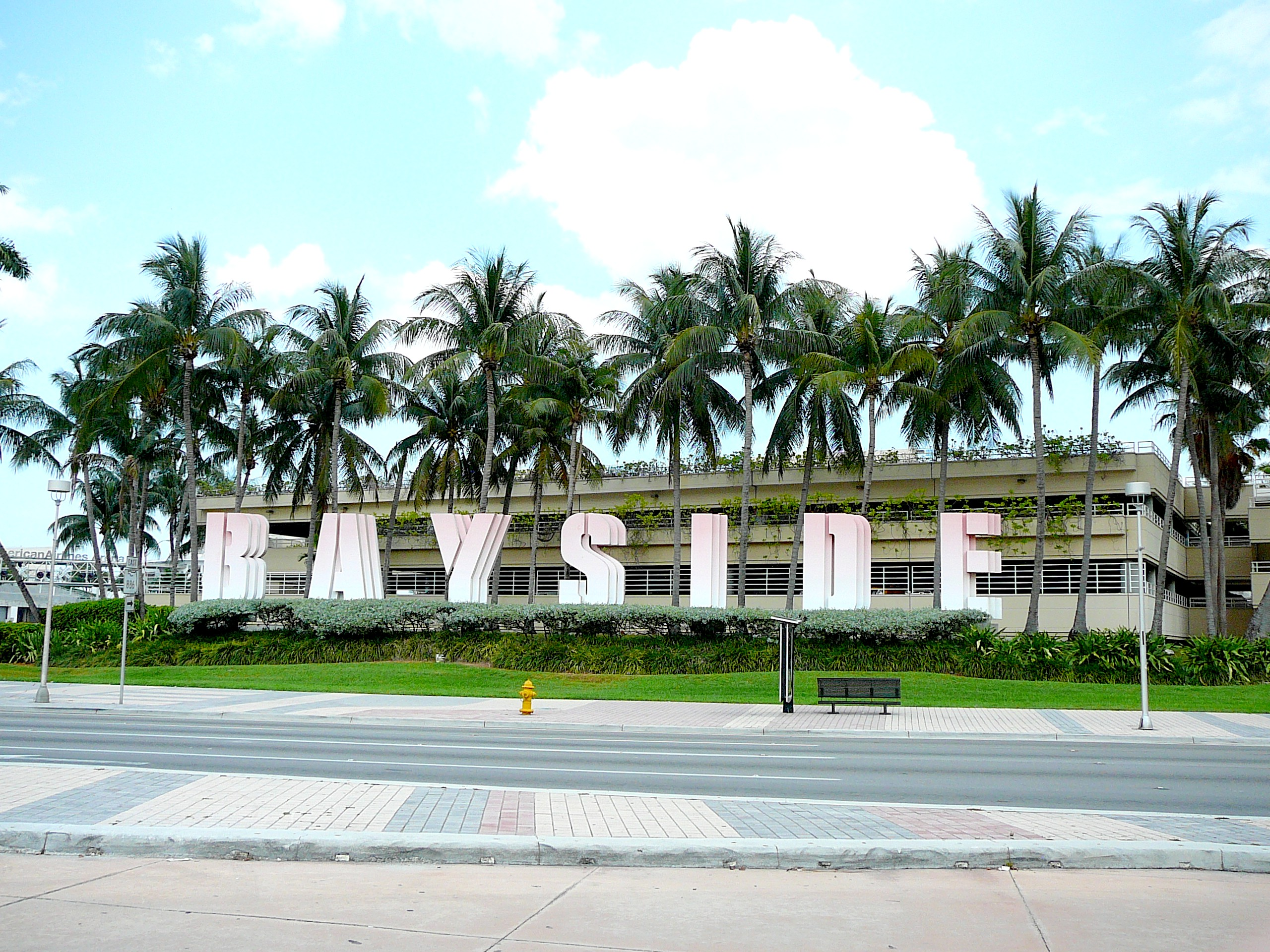
Facade of a parking garage spelling out the center's name (May 2008)

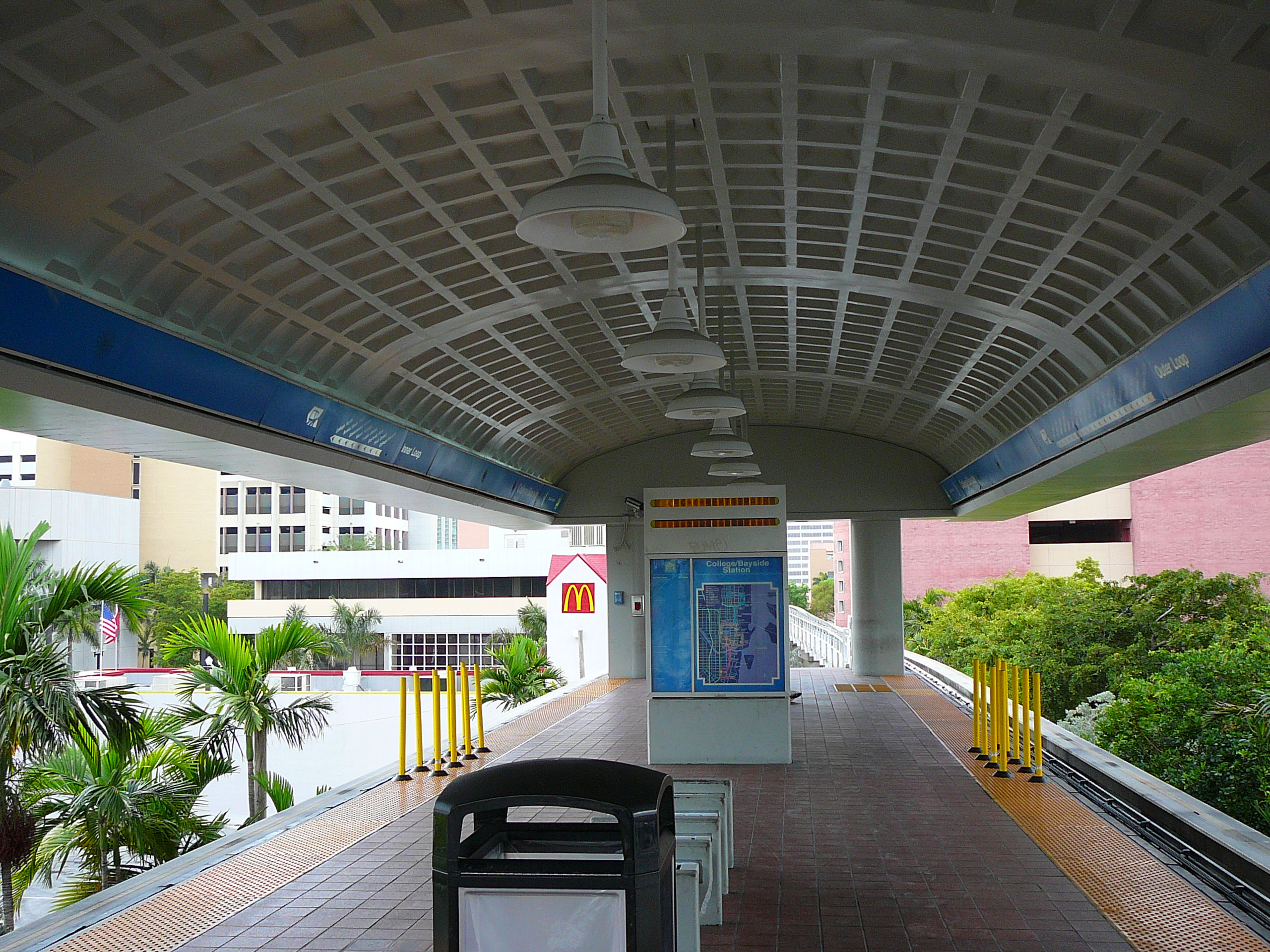
The College/Bayside station, which serves as transportation to the mall (May 2008)

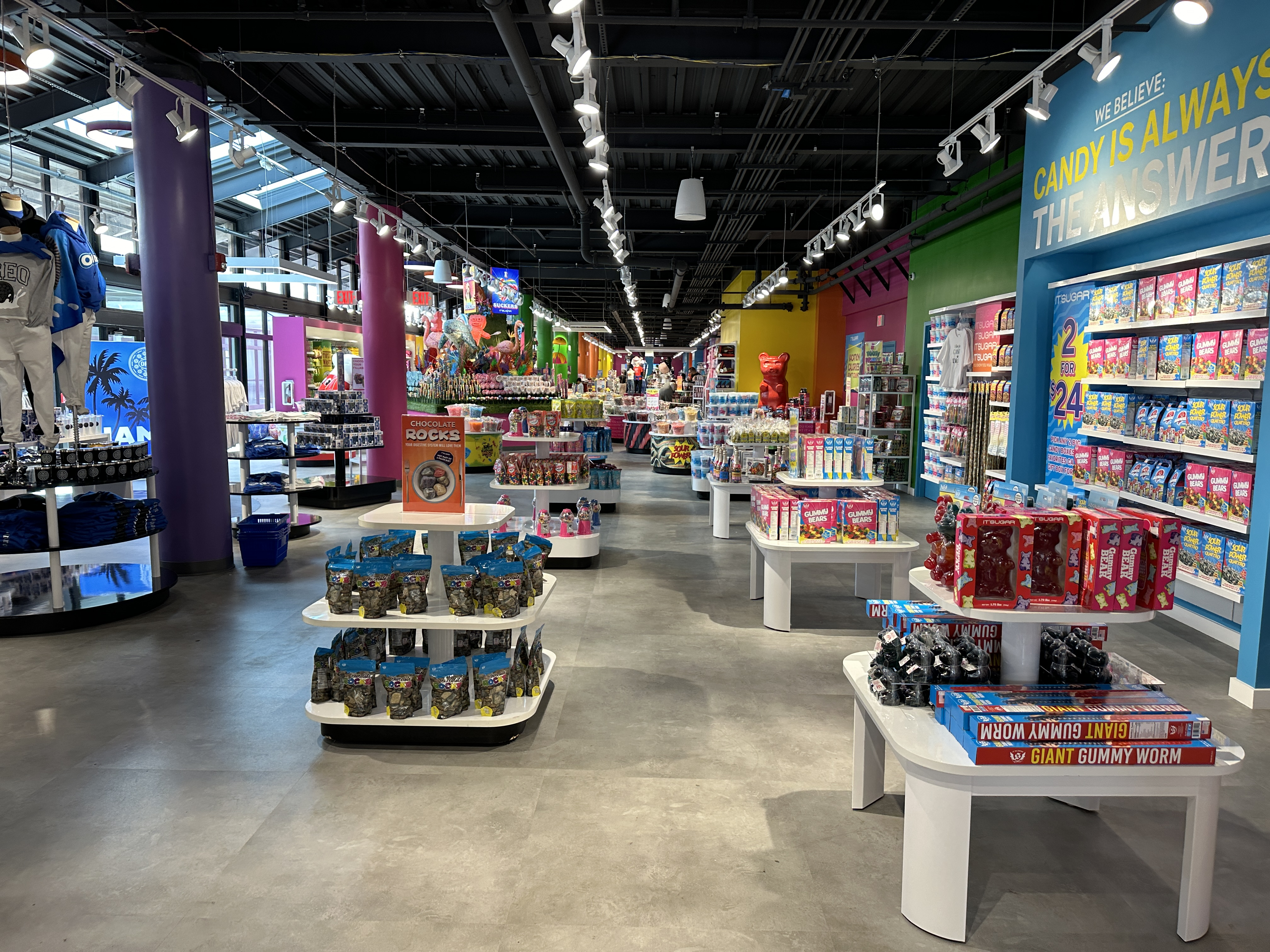
IT'SUGAR Candy Store (April 2024)

== See also ==
- The Outlet Collection at Riverwalk in New Orleans, Louisiana, a festival marketplace also developed by Rouse now operating as an outlet mall
- Broadway Market in Baltimore, Maryland, a similar complex
