= George Washington Carver High School (Naples, Florida) =

Former segregated school in Naples, Florida

Location
- 350 10th Street North; Naples, Florida; United States
- Coordinates: 26°09′04″N 81°47′40″W

Information
- Type: Public
- Opened: 1959
- Closed: 1968
- School district: District School Board of Collier County
- Grades: 9-12
- USGS

George Washington Carver High School was a public secondary school in Naples, Florida. It served as the high school for black students until the public schools were integrated in 1968.

== History ==
For most of its history, Collier County did not provide an education for the black youth of Naples. They were allowed to attend schools such as Dunbar High School in Fort Myers, a one-hour bus trip, and later to Bethune School in Immokalee.

In the 1950s, schools for elementary-school-aged blacks were opened and grades were added year by year. By 1959, a high school was added and George Washington Carver High School was founded. There were two teachers provided for the school. Athletics also were segregated, so the teams had to travel long distances for games. Blacks were not allowed to attend the Naples High School's games but were permitted to watch through the fence.

The school graduated a total of 33 students in its 9-year history. In the mid-1960s, Collier County School superintendent Bill Reynolds integrated the faculty of Naples High School by moving Herbert Cambridge, a teacher at Carver, to Naples. Unlike many segregated districts in Florida, there was no court order and black students were integrated into the white schools with little public comment in 1968.

The school site today houses the River Park Community Center as well as the George Washington Carver public housing project.
