= Barron G. Collier High School =

High school in Naples, Florida, United States

Location
- 5600 Cougar Drive; Naples, Florida 34109; United States; 26°13′N 81°45.6′W

Information
- Type: Comprehensive public high school
- Motto: All Students Can Learn
- Opened: 1978; 48 years ago
- School district: Collier County Public Schools
- NCES School ID: 120033000357
- Principal: Sean C Kinsley
- Teaching staff: 63.61 (on an FTE basis)
- Grades: 9–12
- Enrollment: 1,472 (2024-2025)
- Student to teacher ratio: 23.14
- Colors: Blue, grey
- Mascot: Cougar
- Rival: Naples High School; Gulf Coast High School
- Website: bch.collierschools.com

Barron G. Collier High School is a four-year public high school located in North Naples, Florida, United States, near Pine Ridge and about 10 miles (16 km) northeast of the city of Naples.

Barron Collier was included in Newsweek's 2006 list of top U.S. high schools by Jay Mathews's Challenge Index.

== History ==
The school was opened in 1978 and is named after Barron Collier, an entrepreneur who founded Collier County.

== Athletics ==
Barron Collier High School is one of the seven members of the Collier County Athletic Conference. The school's official list of sports is separated by season. In 2012 and 2013, both the men and women's tennis teams won the state title. In 2006 and 2008, the Cougar Varsity Girls Basketball team won the Class 5A state championship. The main athletic crosstown rivals are Naples High School, Lely High School, and Gulf Coast High School.

=== Fall sports ===
- Football
- Golf
- Boys and Girls Cross Country
- Swimming and Diving
- Girls Volleyball

=== Winter sports ===
- Boys Basketball
- Girls Basketball
- Boys Soccer
- Girls Soccer
- Wrestling
- Bowling
- Girls Weightlifting

=== Spring sports ===
- Boys Baseball
- Boys Lacrosse
- Girls Lacrosse
- Softball
- Tennis
- Track and Field

== Recognition ==
- Ranked as an 'A' school based on FCAT scores
- Boys Tennis State Champions: 2010, 2011, 2012, and 2013
- Boys Soccer State Champions: 2025
- Girls Basketball State Champions: 2006 and 2008
- Wrestling State Champions: 1994
- Baseball State Champions: 1997

== Alumni ==
- Haley Bennett, actress
- Adam Botana, member of the Florida House of Representatives
- Bjorn Fratangelo, professional tennis player
- David Grutman, Miami-based nightclub and restaurant owner, and mogul
- Courtney Hansen, actress, television personality, syndicated columnist, and model
- Anthony Herrera, NFL offensive guard
- Jeff Heuerman, Denver Broncos tight end
- Lauren Melo, businesswoman and politician
- Chris Resop, Major League Baseball pitcher
- Jonathan Isaac, Orlando Magic, NBA

== Images ==
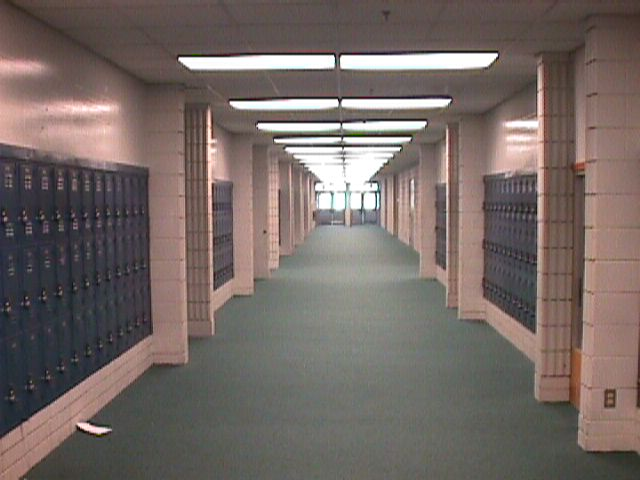
Interior of campus in 2001

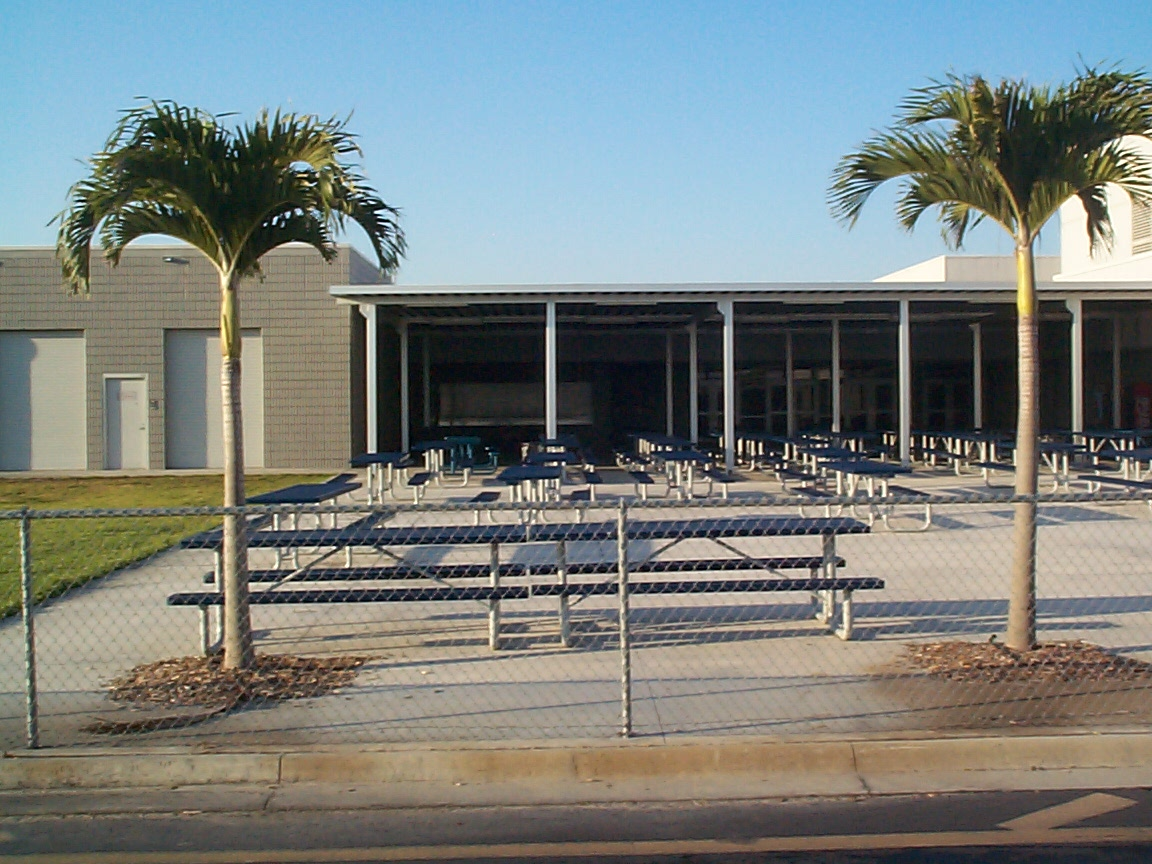
Patio which also serves as an outdoor cafeteria
