= Kerry Brown (defensive back) =

American football player

No. 14 – Minnesota Golden Gophers
- Position: Safety
- Class: Redshirt Junior

Personal information
- Listed height: 5 ft 10 in (1.78 m)
- Listed weight: 190 lb (86 kg)

Career information
- High school: Naples (Naples, Florida)
- College: Minnesota (2023–present)
- Stats at ESPN

Kerry Brown is an American football defensive back for the Minnesota Golden Gophers.

== Early life ==
Brown attended Naples High School in Naples, Florida. During his senior season, he totaled 76 tackles with 11 going for a loss, two sacks, three forced fumbles, and a fumble recovery. Brown was rated as a three-star recruit and the 129th overall player in the state of Florida by 247Sports, and committed to play college football for the Minnesota Golden Gophers over offers from other schools such as NC State, Boston College, Illinois, Indiana, and Maryland.

== College career ==
As a freshman in 2023, Brown played in five games with one start, recording eight tackles. In week 3 of the 2024 season, he brought in two interceptions in a victory versus Nevada. Brown finished the 2024 season with 63 tackles and two interceptions. In 2025, he notched 56 tackles with four being for a loss, four pass deflections, and two interceptions.
