= Anthony Herrera (American football) =

American football player (born 1980)

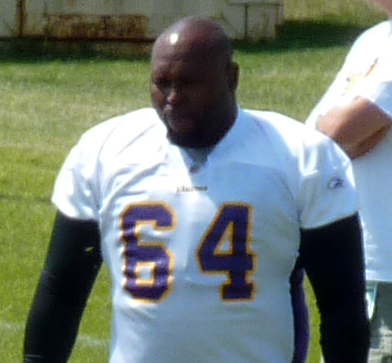
- Herrera in 2009

No. 64
- Position: Offensive guard

Personal information
- Born: June 14, 1980 (age 46); Trinidad and Tobago
- Listed height: 6 ft 2 in (1.88 m)
- Listed weight: 315 lb (143 kg)

Career information
- High school: Barron G. Collier (Naples, Florida, U.S.)
- College: Tennessee (1999–2003)
- NFL draft: 2004: undrafted

Career history
- Minnesota Vikings (2004–2011)

Career NFL statistics
- Games played: 80
- Games started: 70
- Fumble recoveries: 1
- Stats at Pro Football Reference

Anthony Herrera (born June 14, 1980) is a former American football offensive guard. He played college football for the University of Tennessee and was signed as an undrafted free agent by the Minnesota Vikings.

Herrera was born a citizen of Trinidad and Tobago, but later gained American citizenship.

== Early life ==
Herrera attended Barron G. Collier High School in Naples, Florida.

== Professional career ==
Herrera was the starting right guard for the Minnesota Vikings from 2007 to 2011.

== Personal life ==
Herrera was a contestant on NBC's Minute to Win It in an online exclusive episode playing to win money for the Indian Nations Football Conference and the Boys and Girls Club of Collier County.
