= Keith Eloi =

American football player (born 1984)

Profile
- Position: Wide receiver

Personal information
- Born: November 1, 1984 (age 42); Miami, Florida
- Listed height: 5 ft 10 in (1.78 m)
- Listed weight: 190 lb (86 kg)

Career information
- High school: Lely (Naples, Florida)
- College: Nebraska-Omaha
- NFL draft: 2009: undrafted

Career history
- Washington Redskins (2009)*; Omaha Nighthawks (2010)*; Kansas City Command (2012)
- * Offseason or practice squad member only
- Stats at ArenaFan.com

Keith Eloi (born November 1, 1984) is an American former football wide receiver. He graduated from Lely High School in Naples, FL. Keith was signed by the Washington Redskins as an undrafted free agent in 2009. He played college football at Nebraska-Omaha.

== Professional career ==
=== Washington Redskins ===
Eloi was signed by the Washington Redskins as an undrafted free agent following the 2009 NFL draft on May 7, 2009. He was released on September 5 and was re-signed to the practice squad on December 2. He was released from the practice squad on December 9.

=== Omaha Nighthawks ===
Eloi signed with Omaha Nighthawks on May 6, 2010.

== Personal ==
In early March 2009 Eloi made some news by jumping off the ground into the back of a pickup truck. The video of him doing this was uploaded to YouTube and has gotten over 367,000 views as of February 17, 2010. On July 23, 2009, another video of Eloi was uploaded to YouTube that showed him jumping out of a swimming pool backwards and has gotten over 500,000 views as of February 17, 2010.
