= Steve Octavien =

American football player (born 1984)

No. 53, 95, 51
- Position: Linebacker

Personal information
- Born: November 25, 1984 (age 41); Belle Glade, Florida, U.S.
- Listed height: 6 ft 0 in (1.83 m)
- Listed weight: 238 lb (108 kg)

Career information
- High school: Lely (Naples, Florida)
- College: Nebraska
- NFL draft: 2008: undrafted

Career history
- Kansas City Chiefs (2008)*; Washington Redskins (2008)*; Dallas Cowboys (2008–2009); Cleveland Browns (2010); Tampa Bay Storm (2012); Omaha Nighthawks (2012); Montreal Alouettes (2013)*; San Jose SaberCats (2013); Los Angeles Kiss (2014)
- * Offseason or practice squad member only

Career NFL statistics
- Total tackles: 9
- Forced fumbles: 1
- Stats at Pro Football Reference

Career AFL statistics
- Total tackles: 36
- Sacks: 6.5
- Pass deflections: 3
- Stats at ArenaFan.com

Steven Octavien (born November 25, 1984) is an American former professional football player who was a linebacker in the National Football League (NFL) for the Washington Redskins, Dallas Cowboys and Cleveland Browns. He played college football for the Nebraska Cornhuskers.

== Early life ==
Octavien is of Haitian descent, and attended Lely High School. He became a starter at linebacker as a sophomore. In his last 2 years he was used as a two-way player.

In his junior season, he won the state title in the discus throw and finished second as a senior. In 2003, his personal-best throw of 193-7 was the tenth-best prep mark in the nation.

== College career ==
Octavien enrolled at Harper College. As freshman, he posted 124 tackles (15 for loss), 8 sacks, 3 interceptions, 2 blocked field goals and one blocked punt, while contributing to a 10-1 record. In 2004, he played in only four games because of an injury.

He also was a track standout, running the second leg on the school’s 2004 national champion 4 × 400 metres relay team and winning the Division III junior college discus throw title with a mark of 164-7.

Octavien accepted a football scholarship from the University of Nebraska–Lincoln. In 2005, he was injured in the Cornhuskers' season opener against the University of Maine, and was lost for the year.

As a redshirt junior, he only played in 9 games after missing 4 four contests while rehabbing a leg injury. He posted 32 tackles (4 for loss), one sack, 2 passes defensed, one quarterback hurry and one forced fumble, while contributing for a defense that ranked in the top 25 nationally in scoring defense.

As a senior, he started 8 out of 12 games at Will linebacker, leading the team with 92 total tackles, 15 tackles for loss and 9 quarterback hurries. He also had 3 passes defensed and 2 sacks. He was named the team's Defensive Most Valuable Player.

Played in 22 games with 10 starts in three years at Nebraska, finishing with 128 tackles, 3.0 sacks, 21.0 ~ tackles for losses, 1 1 pressures, five breakups and a forced fumble.

== Professional career ==
=== Kansas City Chiefs ===
Octavien was signed by the Kansas City Chiefs as an undrafted free agent after not being selected in the 2008 NFL draft. He was waived injured on August 30.

=== Washington Redskins ===
On November 20, 2008, he was signed by the Washington Redskins to their practice squad.

=== Dallas Cowboys ===
On November 30, 2008, the Dallas Cowboys signed Octavien from the Washington Redskins practice squad. He was declared inactive in his first 2 games, before making his NFL debut with 2 special teams tackles and a forced fumble against the Baltimore Ravens.

In 2009, he played in 14 games and tied for fourth on the team with 12 special teams tackles. He was released on September 4, 2010.

=== Cleveland Browns ===
On December 22, 2010, he was signed as a free agent by the Cleveland Browns. He wasn't re-signed at the end of the season.

=== Omaha Nighthawks ===
In 2011, he was signed by the Omaha Nighthawks of the United Football League. He played linebacker and special teams.

=== Tampa Bay Storm ===
On April 3, 2012, the Tampa Bay Storm of the Arena Football League signed him as a free agent. His value showed during the season on the field and in the locker room, as a veteran who became a leader for younger teammates.

=== Montreal Alouettes ===
On February 16, 2013, he was signed by the Montreal Alouettes of the Canadian Football League to a two-year contract. He was released before the start of the season.

=== San Jose SaberCats ===
In June 2013, Octavien was assigned to the San Jose SaberCats of the Arena Football League. On August 2, he was placed on the inactive reserve.

=== LA Kiss ===
On December 26, 2013, he was selected in the AFL expansion draft by the LA Kiss of the Arena Football League.

== Personal life ==
His sister Dayana was a three-time track All-American in the hammer and discus throw at the University of South Florida and competed in the 2004 U.S. Olympic Trials, 2007 Pan American Games, and the 2008 Summer Olympics.
