= Collier County Public Schools =

School district in Southwest Florida

Address
- 5775 Osceola Trail Collier County, Florida Naples, Florida, 34109

District information
- Grades: VPK - 12 (with adult education programs)
- Superintendent: Leslie Ricciardelli
- School board: Jerry Rutherford; Stephanie Lucarelli; Kelly Litchter; Erick Carter; Tim Moshier

Students and staff
- Students: 48,000
- Teachers: 3,200

Other information
- Telephone: (239) 377-0001
- Website: https://www.collierschools.com

The Collier County Public Schools (or District School Board of Collier County) is a school district in Collier County, Florida. The district has schools in four cities throughout the county: Everglades City, Immokalee, Marco Island, and Naples. The district employs approximately 3,200 teachers, 49% of whom have advanced degrees. The district includes 58 schools: 29 elementary schools, 10 middle schools, 8 high schools, along with 7 charter schools, two technical schools educating adult or dually-enrolled high school students, and 5 alternative schools. The district has an 'A' overall grade.

== History ==
Gulfview Middle School was the first school to open in Naples in 1938.

Until the end of the 1950s, the school district did not provide a high school for African-American students in Naples. Students who wished to attend high school were bused to Fort Myers, and later to Immokalee, to get an education. In the 1950s, elementary schools for black children were opened, and by adding grades every year, eventually reached the high school level. In 1959, George Washington Carver High School was opened with two teachers. In the mid-1960s, the district moved Carver teacher Herbert Cambridge to Naples High School, which was the districts first experience with integration. In 1968 the black students were reassigned to white schools and Carver was closed.

=== Censorship of books as "unsuitable for students" ===
In February 2022, the school district placed warning labels on over 100 books in its libraries declaring them as "unsuitable for students" in response to a report issued by a conservative group. The Heritage Foundation, a conservative think tank, noted that the labels prevented teachers from exercising their "responsibility to decide what content is age-appropriate when they choose what to teach in class."

On August 28, 2023, Collier County Public Schools banned more than 300 books from its school libraries.

== High schools ==
- Aubrey Rogers High School
- Barron Collier High School
- eCollier Virtual Academy
- Golden Gate High School
- Gulf Coast High School
- Immokalee High School
- Lely High School
- Lorenzo Walker Technical High
- Naples High School
- Palmetto Ridge High School

== Middle schools ==
- East Naples Middle
- Golden Gate Middle
- North Naples Middle
- Manatee Middle
- Pine Ridge Middle
- Corkscrew Middle
- Cypress Palm Middle
- Everglades City
- Immokalee Middle
- Oakridge Middle
- Gulfview Middle

== Elementary schools ==
- Avalon Elementary
- Bear Creek Elementary
- Big Creek Elementary
- Big Cypress Elementary
- Calusa Park Elementary
- Corkscrew Elementary
- Eden Park Elementary
- Estates Elementary
- Golden Gate Elementary
- Golden Terrace Elementary
- Herbert Cambridge Elementary
- Highlands Elementary
- Lake Park Elementary
- Lake Trafford Elementary
- Laurel Oak Elementary
- Lely Elementary
- Lavern Gaynor Elementary
- Manatee Elementary
- Mike Davis Elementary
- Naples Park Elementary
- Osceola Elementary
- Palmetto Elementary
- Parkside Elementary
- Pelican Marsh Elementary
- Pinecrest Elementary
- Poinciana Elementary
- Sabal Palm Elementary
- Sea Gate Elementary
- Shadowlawn Elementary
- Tommie Barfield Elementary
- Veterans Memorial Elementary
- Village Oaks Elementary
- Vineyards Elementary

== Charter Schools ==
- Marco Island Charter Middle School (6-8)
- Collier Charter Academy (K-8)
- Gulf Coast Charter Academy (K-8)
- BridgePrep Academy (K-8)
- Immokalee Community School (K-6)
- Marco Island Academy (9-12)
- Everglades City School (VPK-12)

== Alternative schools/sites ==
- Beacon High School
- Collier Regional Juvenile Detention Center*
- Everglades City School (PK-12)
- New Beginnings (Naples & Immokalee)
- Phoenix Program (Naples and Immokalee)
- Teen Parenting Program
- Partnership with the Florida Department of Juvenile Justice.
