= Lely High School =

Coordinates: 26.0906485°N 81.7198087°W

- 1 Lely High School Blvd. Naples, FL 34113

Information
- Type: Public
- Motto: Strive to do your best
- Established: 1975
- School district: Collier County Public Schools
- Principal: Jennifer Bledsoe
- Staff: 66.44 (FTE)
- Enrollment: 1,507 (2023–2024)
- Student to teacher ratio: 22.68
- Colors: Black and Orange
- Mascot: Trojan
- Rival: Naples High School
- Feeder schools: East Naples Middle, Manatee Middle, Marco island Charter Middle
- Website: https://www.collierschools.com/LHS

Lely High School is a four-year public high school located in Lely Resort, Collier County, Florida, about 10 miles (16 km) southeast of Downtown Naples.

The school serves Naples Manor, Marco Island, Lely, Verona Walk, and some unincorporated areas of Collier County. The school is a part of the District School Board of Collier County. Lely's Feeder Schools are East Naples Middle, Manatee Middle, and Marco Island Charter Middle.

== History ==
Lely High School opened its doors to students in the 1974-75 school year. In the 1990s the population of Naples was rising. As a result, Lely was becoming overcrowded, so three new buildings were added onto the school.

In 2004 Golden Gate High School opened, which relieved the overcrowding of both Lely and Naples High School. When the 2010-11 year zone change took place, students were placed into Golden Gate from Naples and Lely High to keep the student populations equal.

== Demographics ==
Lely is 39.56% Hispanic, 35.85% White, 21.5% Black, 0.55% Asian.

== JROTC ==
Members of JROTC are called Cadets. There are four teams for cadets; Drill Team, Exhibition, Color Guard, and Raiders. The Drill Team has a Drill Competition in March. Raiders also have a Raider competition. In the summer a handful of cadets get accepted to go to Summer camp with other schools in the area.

== Clubs and honor societies ==
The school is home to several extracurricular clubs and honor societies. The following is a list of just some of the many clubs and societies the school offers:

- Academic Team
- Key Club
- Mu Alpha Theta
- National Honor Society
- Spanish Honor Society
- JROTC
- Art Club
- Chemistry club
- Drama Club
- Debate Team
- Future Business Leaders of America (FBLA)
- Poetry Club
- C.O.R.E. Society
- TRI-M (Music Honor Society)

== Music department ==
The following are ensembles (or groups) that Lely High School currently offers to its students for participation: Marching Band, Jazz Band, Symphonic Band, Concert Band, Color Guard/Flagline, and Orchestra.

In the spring of 2015, the LHS Symphonic Band received an overall rating of SUPERIOR at the District 18 concert band festival. This was the first time the group had received such a rating since 2004.

In the fall of 2015, The Lely Trojan Marching Band received straight superior ratings and in the spring of 2016, both the concert band and symphonic band received straight superior ratings for the concert MPA.

In the spring of 2026, The Lely Trojan Chamber Orchestra received straight superior ratings at their MPA and went to states earning an overall excellent at their state MPA.

== Sports ==
=== Boys and girls ===
- Basketball
- Cross Country
- Golf
- Lacrosse
- Soccer
- Swimming & Diving
- Tennis
- Track & Field

=== Boys ===
- Baseball
- Wrestling
- Football

=== Girls ===
- Cheerleading
- Softball
- Volleyball

== Notable alumni ==
- Jesse Witten (Class of 2001), former tennis professional, $402,100 prize money earned, University of Kentucky graduate
- Keith Eloi (Class of 2003), former NFL practice squad wide receiver with the Washington Redskins in 2009
- Steve Octavien (Class of 2003), former NFL/CFL/AFL linebacker with the Dallas Cowboys and the Cleveland Browns
- Lauren Embree (Class of 2009), former tennis professional and two-time NCAA National Champion (2011, 2012), University of Florida graduate
- Asmahan Farhat (Mercedes) (Class of 2009), former Olympic swimmer who represented Libya at the 2008 Summer Olympics, Doctor of Pharmacy from the University of Colorado Anschutz
- Makinton Dorleant (Class of 2011), former NFL/AFL cornerback who played 4 games with the Green Bay Packers in 2016
