= Lewis Gilbert (American football) =

American football player (born 1956)

No. 88, 82, 86, 89
- Position: Tight end

Personal information
- Born: May 24, 1956 (age 70); Naples, Florida, U.S.
- Listed height: 6 ft 4 in (1.93 m)
- Listed weight: 225 lb (102 kg)

Career information
- High school: Naples
- College: Florida
- NFL draft: 1978: undrafted

Career history
- Atlanta Falcons (1978–1979); Philadelphia Eagles (1980); San Francisco 49ers (1980); Los Angeles Rams (1981); Tampa Bay Bandits (1983-1984)

Career NFL statistics
- Receptions: 1
- Receiving yards: 7
- Stats at Pro Football Reference

Lewis Howe Gilbert Jr. (born May 24, 1956) is an American former professional football player who was a tight end for three seasons in the National Football League (NFL) in the late 1970s and early 1980s. He played college football for the Florida Gators. Undrafted in the 1978 NFL draft, Howe signed with the NFL's Atlanta Falcons as a free agent, and played for four different NFL teams in four years.

Gilbert was born in Naples, Florida. He attended Naples High School, and played for the Naples Golden Eagles high school football team.

While attending the University of Florida, he was a three-year letterman for coach Doug Dickey's Gators teams from 1974 to 1977. As a senior, he started all eleven games for the Gators. He graduated from the University of Florida with a bachelor's degree in exercise and sport science in 1978. In 1979, Gilbert returned to Gainesville to serve as a graduate assistant for the Gators under new head coach Charley Pell.

As a professional free agent, Gilbert appeared in nineteen NFL games in four seasons, including four games for the Atlanta Falcons in 1978, three games for the Philadelphia Eagles in 1980, six games for the San Francisco 49ers in 1980, and six games for the Los Angeles Rams in 1981. Employed mostly as a blocking end, he had one career reception for seven yards in 1980.

== See also ==
- Florida Gators football, 1970–79
