= Gulf Coast High School =

Location
- 7878 Shark Way; Naples, Florida 34119; United States; 26°16′17″N 81°42′26″W

Information
- Type: Comprehensive public high school
- Opened: 1998; 28 years ago
- School district: Collier County Public Schools
- CEEB code: 101540
- NCES School ID: 120033003336
- Principal: Tim Kutz
- Teaching staff: 79.33 (on an FTE basis)
- Grades: 9–12
- Enrollment: 1,831 (2023–2024)
- Student to teacher ratio: 23.08
- Colors: Silver, teal, and black
- Mascot: Shark
- Rival: Barron Collier High School
- Website: gch.collierschools.com

Gulf Coast High School is a public high school located in North Naples, Florida about 15 miles (24 km) from Naples, Florida. The school opened in August 1998 and is part of the Collier County Public Schools.

== Athletics ==
Gulf Coast High School is one of the seven members of the Collier County Athletic Conference and also belongs to the Florida High School Athletic Association (FHSAA). The school offers the following athletic programs.

=== Fall sports ===
- Boys & Girls Cross Country
- American football (Freshmen, JV, Varsity)
- Boys & Girls Golf
- Boys & Girls Swimming & Diving
- Girls Volleyball (Freshmen, JV, Varsity)
- Girls Cheerleading

=== Winter sports ===
- Boys & Girls Soccer (JV, Varsity)
- Wrestling
- Boys & Girls Basketball (Freshmen, JV, Varsity)

=== Spring sports ===
- Baseball
- Softball
- Boys & Girls Tennis
- Boys & Girls Track and field
- Boys & Girls Lacrosse (JV, Varsity)

The boys soccer team have won the state championship 3 times: in 2013, 2018, and 2021.

=== Theatre ===
Gulf Coast High School is part of District Six thespians and is International Thespian Society Troupe number 5876. Each year the theatre troupe puts on four main events. First there is a main-stage, full length production. There is also either a musical or dinner theatre, and then there are two shows featuring events scheduled to appear in District competition including Evening Extraordinaire: A One Act affair, and A Dramatic Showcase (featuring Individual Events). Occasionally there are shows that are produced every few years.

Pieces are rated in the following fashion: Superior, Excellent, Good, Fair, Poor. In 2006, for the first time in troupe history, one theatre student received the award for Best Overall Technical Theatre Piece for their Costume design in the District 6 Competition. This piece was chosen by the judges as the best technical theatre entry out of all the high schools participating, and out of all sub-categories in Technical Theatre. In 2007, three students were chosen to represent District 6 in State Competition. One received the award for Best Overall Technical Theatre Piece for a scenic design in the District 6 Competition, and a duo received the award for the Best Overall Pantomime in the District 6 Competition. In 2010, Gulf Coast High School received further acclaim after receiving straight superiors on their one-act play, and on three individual student's monologues. The students also participated at the Florida State Thespian Competition in Tampa, Florida back in April 2010.

=== Inventeam ===
In 2004, Gulf Coast High School was one of thirteen schools nationwide that received a $10,000 grant from the Lemelson-MIT Inventeams Program. The program is part of the Lemelson-MIT program which endeavors to foster a spirit of research and invention in high schools nationwide through grants. The GCHS Inventeam's invention was a hybrid between an air ionizing system similar to the Ionic Breeze and a typical ceiling fan. The idea was that the ceiling fan would circulate the air around the room, and as the air flowed over the ionizing system it would be cleaned as well, providing multipurpose from an appliance standard in many households.

=== Model United Nations ===
In 2010, the GCHS Model UN team expanded, and since then the team has won delegation awards at Georgia Tech, Columbia, UCLA, Pennsylvania, Stanford, Miami, FGCU, among many more delegate awards at other conferences. In Fall 2011, the team was ranked 10th in the nation, hardly a year after the expansion of its program. In 2018, the team was ranked number one in the nation for public schools, and 6th overall.

=== Band ===
The GCHS marching band is a class 5a band. It is led by Brett Robinson. Every other year, the band participates in either the Universal or Disney parades. In 2015, the band participated in the nationally televised Macy's Thanksgiving Day Parade in New York City.

== Demographics ==
These are the school's demographics as of May 2021:

- White: 63%
- Hispanic: 25%
- Black: 5%
- Asian: 3%
- Multi-racial: 2%
- Native American: 0.5%

== Campus ==
The school consists of 8 main buildings which enclose a courtyard that is one-quarter of an mile (0.40 km) in size. The layout of the school is similar to Timber Creek High School, Olympia High School, Winter Springs High School, and Viera High School.

Most of the buildings are on a single level, however Building 5 has classrooms on a second floor and the 1,200-seat auditorium has a balcony on a second level. Building 1 is made up of offices, building 2 is made up of the media center, building 3 consists of the gymnasium and weight rooms, buildings 4, 5, and 6 are made up of classrooms, building 7 is the cafeteria, and building 8 is made up of the auditorium and music sector.

== Accolades ==
In 2015, the school was included in U.S. News & World Report's Best High Schools Ranking, and was one of six Collier County schools to earn a medal. The school was given a silver medal.

== Notable alumni ==
- Jake O'Connell, former professional NFL player
- Marcel Rodriguez, Filmmaker/Actor
- Luke Masterson, current UFL linebacker for the St. Louis Battlehawks
