= Marco Island Academy =

Coordinates: 25.9336°N 81.6778°W

- 2255 San Marco Rd. Marco Island, FL 34145

Information
- Type: Charter
- Established: 2011
- School district: Collier County Public Schools
- Principal: Melissa Scott
- Grades: 9-12
- Enrollment: 210 (2018-19)
- Colors: Grey, Columbia Blue, White and Navy
- Mascot: Manta Ray
- Feeder schools: Marco Island Charter Middle School (MICMS)
- Website: https://www.marcoislandacademy.org/

Marco Island Academy is a public charter high school (9-12) located in Marco Island, Collier County, Florida.

== Clubs and honor societies ==
Marco Island Academy hosts the following clubs and societies: Key Club, National Honor Society, Thespian Society, FCA, Video Game Club, Japanese Club, Culinary Club, Media (Yearbook and School Newspaper), Interact Club, History and Culture Club, Scholar Bowl, and Student Government.

== Varsity sports ==
	Baseball / Softball	Basketball	Cross Country	Football	Cheerleading	Golf	Soccer	Swimming	Tennis	Track & Field	Volleyball
Men's	✓	✓	✓	✓	✓	✓	✓	✓	✓	✓	
Women's		✓	✓		✓	✓	✓	✓	✓	✓	✓

Lacrosse for both boys and girls is an option for students at Lely High School.

== Demographics ==
In (2018–19), Collier County Schools ran a quarterly survey on all schools in the district, with Marco Island Academy having a total enrollment of 209.
