= Michael Walker (American football) =

American football player (born 1996)

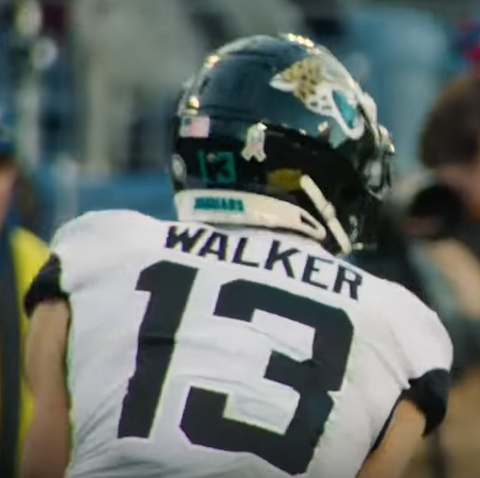
- Walker with the Jacksonville Jaguars in 2019

Profile
- Position: Wide receiver

Personal information
- Born: October 29, 1996 (age 30); Naples, Florida, U.S.
- Listed height: 5 ft 11 in (1.80 m)
- Listed weight: 195 lb (88 kg)

Career information
- High school: Naples
- College: Boston College
- NFL draft: 2019: undrafted

Career history
- Jacksonville Jaguars (2019); Philadelphia Eagles (2021); Edmonton Elks (2022)*
- * Offseason or practice squad member only

Awards and highlights
- Second-team All-American (2018); Second-team All-ACC (2018); Third-team All-ACC (2017)

Career NFL statistics
- Receptions: 2
- Receiving yards: 15
- Receiving touchdowns: 0
- Return yards: 424
- Stats at Pro Football Reference

Michael Walker (born October 29, 1996) is an American former professional football player who was a wide receiver in the National Football League (NFL). He played college football for the Boston College Eagles.

== Early life ==
Walker grew up in Naples, Florida and attended Naples High School, where he was a member of the baseball, football, and track teams. Walker passed for 613 yards and seven touchdowns and rushed for 907 yards and 21 touchdowns as the starting quarterback for the Golden Eagles during his senior year while also catching four passes for 113 yards and two touchdowns and returning two kicks for touchdowns and was named the Offensive Player of the Year by the Naples Daily News and the Southwest Florida Male Athlete of the Year by The News-Press. Walker committed to play college football at Boston College over offers from Arizona, Arkansas State, Florida International, and UCF.

== College career ==
Walker played four seasons for the Boston College Eagles. He was listed as a defensive back as a freshman, but primarily served as a kick returner while occasionally lining up as a receiver and finished third in the Atlantic Coast Conference with 686 kickoff return yards and set the school record with 28.8 yards per return while catching two passes for 41 yards and rushing once for 14 yards and was named a Freshman All-American by Sporting News. Walker became the Eagles slot receiver going into his sophomore year and posted career highs with 33 receptions, 420 receiving yards and four receiving touchdowns while returning six kicks for 101 yards and one punt for eight yards.

As a junior, Walker returned 36 kicks for 849 yards (23.6 average) and 27 punts for 354 yards (13.1 average, best in the ACC) while catching 19 passes for 168 yards and a touchdown and was named third-team All-ACC as a return specialist. Walker was named second-team All-ACC and a consensus second-team All-American after being named by the Sporting News, the Football Writers Association of America and the Walter Camp Football Foundation as a senior after returning 40 kicks for 1,020 yards and 20 punts for 274 and a touchdown, while also catching 17 passes for 218 yards. Walker finished his collegiate career with 71 receptions for 847 yards and five touchdowns with 2,656 kick return yards and 636 punt return yards with one touchdown.

== Professional career ==
=== Jacksonville Jaguars ===
Walker signed with the Jacksonville Jaguars as an undrafted free agent on April 28, 2019. He was waived at the end of training camp as part of final roster cuts, but was signed to the team's practice squad on September 1, 2019. The Jaguars promoted Walker to the team's active roster on November 2, 2019. Walker made his NFL debut the following day against the Houston Texans, returning two kicks and two punts. He was placed on injured reserve on December 28, 2019. Walker finished his rookie season with two receptions for 15 yards, 18 kicks returned for 411 yards and three punts for returned 13 yards, and two fumbles lost in seven games played.

Walker was placed on the reserve/COVID-19 list by the Jaguars on August 2, 2020, and was activated five days later. He was waived/injured on September 5, 2020, and subsequently reverted to the team's injured reserve list the next day. He was waived with an injury settlement on September 9.

=== Philadelphia Eagles ===
On June 11, 2021, Walker signed with the Philadelphia Eagles. He was waived/injured on August 10, 2021 and placed on injured reserve. He was released on October 5.

=== Edmonton Elks ===
Walker signed with the Edmonton Elks of the Canadian Football League on February 9, 2022. He was placed on the suspended list on May 20, 2022. He was released on February 14, 2023.
