= Claudin Cherelus =

American football player (born 1999)

No. 53 – Carolina Panthers
- Position: Linebacker
- Roster status: Practice squad

Personal information
- Born: February 9, 1999 (age 27); Golden Gate, Florida, U.S.
- Listed height: 6 ft 2 in (1.88 m)
- Listed weight: 230 lb (104 kg)

Career information
- High school: Golden Gate
- College: UMass (2017–2019); Alcorn State (2020–2022)
- NFL draft: 2023: undrafted

Career history
- New York Jets (2023)*; Carolina Panthers (2023–present)
- * Offseason or practice squad member only

Career NFL statistics as of 2025
- Total tackles: 60
- Pass deflections: 1
- Stats at Pro Football Reference

Claudin Cherelus (born February 9, 1999) is an American professional football linebacker for the Carolina Panthers of the National Football League (NFL). He played college football for the UMass Minutemen and Alcorn State Braves and has also been a member of the New York Jets.

== Early life ==
Cherelus was born on February 9, 1999, and is of Haitian descent. He started playing football in eighth grade and then played three varsity seasons at Golden Gate High School, near Naples, Florida. Cherelus played linebacker and safety and twice earned all-conference honors at Golden Gate while also being a team captain. He initially committed to play college football for the Minnesota Golden Gophers, but instead ended up joining the UMass Minutemen after Minnesota retracted their scholarship offer.

== College career ==
Cherelus redshirted his true freshman year at UMass, 2017. The following year, he played in all 12 games and posted 14 tackles. In 2019, Cherelus appeared in 11 games as a reserve and totaled 39 tackles along with a sack. He opted to transfer to play for the Alcorn State Braves in 2020, although they did not play that year due to COVID-19. Cherelus became a starter for Alcorn State in 2021 and recorded 76 tackles, 11 tackles-for-loss and two sacks. In his final season, he played nine games and tallied 73 tackles, 14.5 tackles-for-loss, six sacks and an interception on his way to being named second-team all-conference. He was invited after the season to the HBCU Legacy Bowl, an all-star game for players from historically black schools.

== Professional career ==
Pre-draft measurables
Height	Weight	Arm length	Hand span	Wingspan	40-yard dash	10-yard split	20-yard split	20-yard shuttle	Three-cone drill	Vertical jump	Broad jump	Bench press
6 ft 0 7/8 in (1.85 m)	224 lb (102 kg)	32 7/8 in (0.84 m)	9 3/4 in (0.25 m)	6 ft 3 7/8 in (1.93 m)	4.54 s	1.69 s	2.58 s	4.47 s	7.56 s	38.0 in (0.97 m)	10 ft 5 in (3.18 m)	18 reps
All values from Pro Day

=== New York Jets ===
Cherelus declined chances to play in the Canadian Football League (CFL) to try to make it in the NFL. He was signed by the New York Jets as an undrafted free agent, but was released as part of the final roster cuts on August 29.

=== Carolina Panthers ===
After being released by the Jets, Cherelus was claimed off waivers by the Carolina Panthers. He was placed on injured reserve on November 3, 2023.

Cherelus was again placed on injured reserve on December 17, 2024, suffering from a season-ending toe injury that required surgery.

On March 13, 2026, Cherelus re-signed with the Panthers on a one-year contract. On September 30, 2026, he was waived with an injury settlement. On November 10, Cherelus was re-signed to the practice squad.

== NFL career statistics ==
Legend
**Bold**	Career high

=== Regular season ===
Year	Team	Games		Tackles					Interceptions						Fumbles				
Year	Team	GP	GS	Cmb	Solo	Ast	Sck	TFL	Int	Yds	Avg	Lng	TD	PD	FF	Fum	FR	Yds	TD
2023	CAR	6	0	0	0	0	0.0	0	0	0	0.0	0	0	0	0	0	0	0	0
2024	CAR	13	2	28	13	15	0.0	0	0	0	0.0	0	0	0	0	0	0	0	0
2025	CAR	**14**	**4**	**32**	**14**	**18**	0.0	0	0	0	0.0	0	0	**1**	0	0	0	0	0
Career		33	6	60	27	33	0.0	0	0	0	0.0	0	0	1	0	0	0	0	0

=== Postseason ===
Year	Team	Games		Tackles					Interceptions						Fumbles				
Year	Team	GP	GS	Cmb	Solo	Ast	Sck	TFL	Int	Yds	Avg	Lng	TD	PD	FF	Fum	FR	Yds	TD
2025	CAR	1	1	9	4	5	0.0	0	0	0	0.0	0	0	0	0	0	0	0	0
Career		1	1	9	4	5	0.0	0	0	0	0.0	0	0	0	0	0	0	0	0
