= Jake O'Connell =

American football player (born 1985)

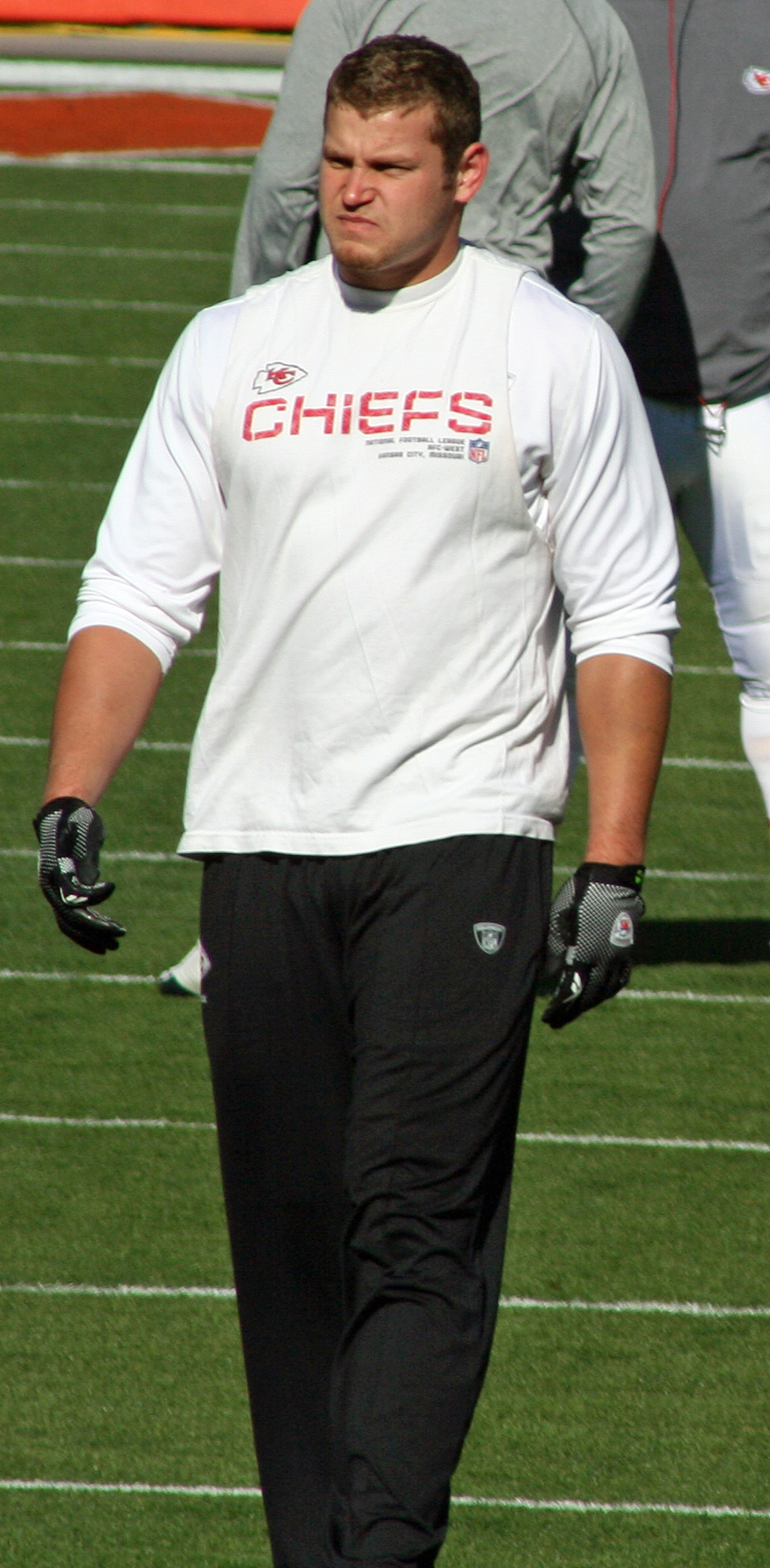
- At a game in Denver in November 2010.

No. 85
- Position: Tight end

Personal information
- Born: November 6, 1985 (age 41); Bonita Springs, Florida, U.S.
- Listed height: 6 ft 4 in (1.93 m)
- Listed weight: 255 lb (116 kg)

Career information
- High school: Naples (FL) Gulf Coast
- College: Miami (OH)
- NFL draft: 2009: 7th round, 237th overall pick

Career history
- Kansas City Chiefs (2009−2012); Denver Broncos (2013)*
- * Offseason or practice squad member only

Career NFL statistics
- Receptions: 15
- Receiving yards: 108
- Stats at Pro Football Reference

Jake Nicholas O'Connell (born November 6, 1985) is an American former professional football player who was a tight end for the Kansas City Chiefs of the National Football League (NFL). He played college football for the Miami RedHawks. O'Connell was selected 237th overall by the Chiefs in the seventh round of the 2009 NFL draft.

O'Connell attended Gulf Coast High School in Naples, Florida and was the first Gulf Coast player ever drafted.
