= Devin Moore (cornerback) =

American football player (born 2003)

No. 29 – Dallas Cowboys
- Position: Cornerback
- Roster status: Injured reserve

Personal information
- Born: October 9, 2003 (age 23)
- Listed height: 6 ft 3 in (1.91 m)
- Listed weight: 198 lb (90 kg)

Career information
- High school: Naples (Naples, Florida)
- College: Florida (2022–2025)
- NFL draft: 2026: 4th round, 114th overall pick

Career history
- Dallas Cowboys (2026–present)
- Stats at Pro Football Reference

Devin Moore (born October 9, 2003) is an American professional football cornerback for the Dallas Cowboys of the National Football League (NFL). He played college football for the Florida Gators and was selected by the Cowboys in the fourth round of the 2026 NFL draft.

== Early life ==
Moore attended Naples High School in Naples, Florida. A four-star recruit, he was selected to the 2022 All-American Bowl. He originally committed to play college football at the University of Notre Dame before flipping to the University of Florida.

== College career ==
Moore struggled with injuries throughout his college career. As a true freshman in 2022, he had six tackles over six games and as a sophomore in 2023, had six tackles and an interception. As a junior in 2024, Moore started six of seven games he played in, recording 17 tackles and two interceptions. He had his first full healthy season his senior year in 2025, starting 11 games and finishing with 35 tackles, two interceptions and one sack.

== Professional career ==
Pre-draft measurables
Height	Weight	Arm length	Hand span	Wingspan	40-yard dash	10-yard split	20-yard split	Vertical jump	Broad jump
6 ft 3 1/4 in (1.91 m)	198 lb (90 kg)	31 5/8 in (0.80 m)	8 5/8 in (0.22 m)	6 ft 4 7/8 in (1.95 m)	4.50 s	1.56 s	2.64 s	34.5 in (0.88 m)	10 ft 1 in (3.07 m)
All values from NFL Combine

Moore was selected by the Dallas Cowboys in the fourth round with the 114th overall pick in the 2026 NFL draft. He was placed on injured reserve on August 30, 2026.
