= Palmetto Ridge High School =

Location
- 1655 Victory Lane; Naples, Florida 34120; United States
- 26.29565°N 81.57765°W

Information
- Type: Public
- Established: 2004
- School district: Collier County Public Schools
- Principal: Tobin R. Walcott
- Teaching staff: 81.67 (FTE)
- Grades: 9-12
- Enrollment: 2,035 (2023–2024)
- Student to teacher ratio: 24.92
- Colors: Silver, Green, and Black
- Rival: Golden Gate High School
- Mascot: Bear
- Website: https://prh.collierschools.com/

Palmetto Ridge High School is a secondary education school located near Naples, in an unincorporated census-designated place in Collier County, Florida, United States. Palmetto Ridge High School is part of the Collier County Public Schools.

== Athletics ==
Palmetto Ridge High School is one of the seven members of the Collier County Athletic Conference. It lists its athletics departments as follows:

=== Fall sports ===
- Boys' football
- Boys' & girls' cross country
- Boys' & girls' golf
- Boys' & girls' swimming & diving
- Girls' cheerleading
- Girls' volleyball

=== Winter sports ===
- Boys' & girls' basketball
- Boys' & girls' soccer
- Boys' & girls' wrestling

=== Spring sports ===
- Boys' baseball
- Boys' & girls' lacrosse
- Boys' & girls' tennis
- Boys' & girls' track and field
- Girls' cheerleading
- Girls' softball

=== Bands ===
- Marching Band
- Guard - Weapon Line and Flag Line
- Jazz Band
- Symphonic Band
- Wind Ensemble
- Wind Symphony

The school's show band has received straight superiors at the Florida Bandmaster's Association Musical Performance Assessment from its opening in 2004 to the present (as of 2018), and is the first to institute a competition band for Collier County Schools. Palmetto Ridge's competition band was placed third at the FMBC State Finals in its introductory year of 2009.

== Career Academies ==
Palmetto Ridge High School has two different career academies. The goal of these programs is to help students who are interested in a certain career. Over the course of their high school education, students enrolled in the academy take several classes relating to the academy, some of which are classes specifically made for academy students.

- Academy of Construction and Fine Woodworking
- Culinary Arts Academy

== Clubs ==
Palmetto Ridge High School has many different extracurricular clubs, including:

- Army Junior Reserve Officers' Training Corps
- Fellowship of Christian Athletes
- International Thespian Society
- Key Club
- Marching Band
- Meme Club
- Model United Nations
- Mu Alpha Theta
- National Honor Society
- Project Unify
- Scholar Bowl
- Science National Honor Society
- Spanish Honor Society
- Student Government Association
- Yearbook

== Demographics ==
=== 2023-2024 ===
- Total student enrollment: 2,028
  - Male: 50.49%
  - Female: 49.51%
- The ethnic makeup of the school:
  - Hispanic: 55.37%
  - White: 29.1%
  - Black: 10.2%
  - Multiracial: 3.8%
  - Asian: 1.33%
  - Native American: 0.15%

== Notable alumni ==
- Dominic Fike (Class of 2014) - rapper, actor and songwriter
