= Ben Ashkenazy =

American real estate developer (born 1969)

- Born: 1968 or 1969 (age 56–57); Israel
- Education: Adelphi University (did not graduate)
- Occupation: Businessman
- Known for: Founder, CEO and majority owner of Ashkenazy Acquisition Corporation
- Spouse: Debra Ashkenazy
- Children: 3

Ben Ashkenazy (born 1969) is an Israeli-American billionaire real estate developer. He is the founder, CEO, and majority owner of Ashkenazy Acquisition Corporation, which has a $12 billion property portfolio. As of 2026, his net worth was estimated at US$1.6 billion.

== Early life ==
Ashkenazy was born in Israel, and grew up in Lawrence, Long Island, New York, the son of Izzy Ashkenazy, also a real estate businessman. He is of Jewish descent.

== Career ==
Ashkenazy bought his first property at the age of 18. He attended night classes at Adelphi University, but did not graduate.

In 1987, he founded Ashkenazy Acquisition Corporation.

In 2013, his company bought London's Old Spitalfields Market, but later sold it. In July 2017, the company bought London's Grosvenor House Hotel for about $750 million.

His company held a long-term lease agreements in the City of Boston for Faneuil Hall Marketplace and South Station. His company formerly leased Washington D.C.'s Union Station, and has a $70 million stake in New York's Plaza Hotel.

In November 2019, his company purchased the 83,923-square-foot Ferndale Shopping Center in Larchmont for a price exceeding $35 million.

In December 2025, his company purchased the retail space that houses Neiman Marcus in the Golden Triangle in Beverly Hills.

== Personal life ==
He is married to Debra Ashkenazy, they have three children, and live on New York City's Fifth Avenue.

Ashkenazy is a minority owner of Euroleague Basketball club Maccabi Tel Aviv B.C.
