= Golden Gate High School =

Public high school in Naples, Florida, United States

Location
- 2925 Titan Way; Naples, FL 34116; United States
- 26.167001°N 81.70094°W

Information
- Type: Public
- Established: 2004
- School district: Collier County Public Schools
- Principal: Geronimo Mulholland
- Teaching staff: 84.11 (FTE)
- Enrollment: 1,886 (2023–2024)
- Student to teacher ratio: 22.42
- Colors: Black and Gold
- Mascot: Titans
- Rival: Palmetto Ridge High School
- Website: https://ggh.collierschools.com/

Golden Gate High School is a secondary education school located near Naples, in an unincorporated census-designated place in Collier County, Florida, United States. Golden Gate High School is part of the District School Board of Collier County.

== Demographics ==
- Male: 53%
- Female: 47%
- White: 9%
- Black: 18%
- Hispanic: 70%
- Asian: 1%
- Multiracial: 2%
- American Indian/Alaskan Native: <1%

== Athletics ==
Golden Gate High School is one of the seven members of the Collier County Athletic Conference. The school has thirteen Athletics departments. The highest placing team in school history at the state level was the 2007-2008 Lady Titan track and field team.

=== Winter sports ===
- volleyball
- Soccer
- Wrestling
- Basketball
- Lacrosse

=== Spring sports ===
- Baseball
- Softball
- Tennis
- Track and Field
- Lacrosse
- Football

== Notable alumni ==
- Claudin Cherelus (Class of 2017) - NFL linebacker for the Carolina Panthers
