= Zyscovich Architecture =

Zysovich Architecture is a Miami, Florida-based international architecture firm. The firm designed the domestic and international terminals at Bogotá's El Dorado International Airport. Bernard Zysovich is the firm's founder.

Zyscovich was acquired by Stratus Team, LLC (Stratus®) in 2022 and in July 2025 was absorbed into the Stratus® brand. Founder Bernard Zyscovich and design lead Suria Yaffar now oversee Zyscovich Studio, a boutique practice within Stratus that continues the legacy Zyscovich brand and its vision-driven, context-sensitive approach to planning and architecture. The studio focuses on high-impact urban planning and design projects across multiple sectors within the broader Stratus network, with projects pursued through the studio delivered by Stratus Team resources..
