= Naples High School =

Public school in Naples, Florida, United States

Location
- 1100 Golden Eagle Circle; Naples, Collier County, Florida 34102; United States; 26°10′22″N 81°47′42″W

Information
- Type: Public
- Established: 1928
- School district: Collier County Public Schools
- Principal: Kristina Lee
- Faculty: 72.61 (on an FTE basis)
- Grades: 9–12
- Enrollment: 1,535 (2024–25)
- Student to teacher ratio: 21.14
- Rival: Lely, Barron Collier, Immokalee
- Publication: "Talon Tribune" (school newspaper)
- Colors Mascot Motto: Blue & Gold; Golden Eagles "There are only two kinds of people: Golden Eagles, and those who want to be Golden Eagles"
- Website: https://nhs.collierschools.com/

Naples High School is a secondary education school located in Naples, Florida, United States, and is one of ten public high schools located in Collier County. Naples High School is part of the Collier County Public Schools.

== Academics ==
SAT, ACT & AP Scores for Naples High School
School Year	SAT Verbal	SAT Math	SAT V+M Composite	SAT Writing	ACT Composite	AP Test Mean	AP % 3 or above
2001–2002	500	511	1011	N/A	19.9	3.56	82%
2002–2003	520	527	1057	N/A	20.6	2.98	63%
2003–2004	507	505	1012	N/A	20.3	2.69	51%
2004–2005	510	523	1033	N/A	20.9	2.69	53%
2005–2006	514	528	1042	507		2.69	52%
2006–2014	No information						
2014–2015	520	504	1024	522	No information		

== Athletics ==
Naples High School competes in District 13 of the Florida High School Athletic Association (FHSAA).

=== Sports ===
The school offers the following sports:

- Baseball (boys)
- Basketball
- Cheerleading
- Cross country running
- Football (boys)
- Golf
- Lacrosse
- Soccer
- Softball (girls)
- Swimming and diving
- Tennis
- Track and field
- Volleyball (girls)
- Weightlifting (girls)
- Wrestling

=== State championships ===
- Baseball: 2009
- Cross country
  - Boys: 1986
  - Girls: 1986, 1990
- Football: 2001, 2007
- Softball:1989, 1990, 1991, 1993, 1994, 1995, 1996, 1998, 2001, 2008
- Tennis
  - Boys: 2002, 2003, 2004
- Wrestling: 1981

== Demographics ==
The District School Board of Collier County website updates each school's demographics daily. The update as of May 2024 lists the school's demographics as follows:

- Hispanic: 47.89%
- White: 34.07%
- Black: 12.2%
- Multiracial: 4.61%
- Asian: 1.04%
- Native American: 0.19%
- Male: 52.04%
- Female: 47.96%
- Home Language English: 46.14%
- Home Language Spanish: 42.7%
- Home Language Haitian Creole: 6.29%
- Home Language Other: 4.87%

== Notable alumni ==
- Lewis Gilbert (Class of 1974) – former NFL tight end, played for 4 teams
- Brian Shimer (Class of 1980) – former USA1 Bobsled driver that won a bronze medal at the 2002 Winter Olympics, head driving coach of USA Bobsled team
- Fred McCrary (Class of 1991) – former NFL fullback/defensive lineman who won Super Bowl XXXVIII with the New England Patriots
- Carmen Cali (Class of 1997) – former MLB relief pitcher with the St. Louis Cardinals and Minnesota Twins
- James Bowman – punk and folk rock musician and singer-songwriter, guitarist and backing vocalist for Against Me!
- Laura Jane Grace – punk rock musician and singer-songwriter, founder and lead vocalist of Against Me!
- Chris Resop – former MLB/NPB relief pitcher, played for 5 MLB teams and the Hanshin Tigers
- Spencer Adkins (Class of 2005) – former NFL linebacker for the Atlanta Falcons, selected in the 2009 NFL Draft
- Carlos Hyde (Class of 2009) – former NFL running back, played for 5 teams, selected in the 2014 NFL Draft
- Monique Evans (Class of 2010) – Miss Texas 2014
- Dominic Fike – musician/singer-songwriter/rapper, most known for songs: "3 Nights" and "Babydoll," member of Geezer
- Michael Walker (Class of 2015) – former NFL wide receiver, played 7 games for the Jacksonville Jaguars in 2019
- Olivia Ponton (Class of 2020) – model and influencer
- Devin Moore (Class of 2022) – NFL cornerback for the Dallas Cowboys, selected in the 4th round of the 2026 NFL Draft
- Kendrick Raphael (Class of 2023) – college football running back for the SMU Mustangs
- Harvey Sarajian (Class of 2023) – professional soccer player for Orlando City SC, selected 5th overall in the 2026 MLS SuperDraft
- Johnny King (Class of 2024) – New Hampshire Fisher Cats pitcher, selected in the 3rd round of the 2024 MLB June Amateur Draft
