= Belle Glade culture =

Archaeological culture in Florida

The Belle Glade culture, or Okeechobee culture, is an archaeological culture that existed from as early as 1000 BCE until about 1700 CE in the area surrounding Lake Okeechobee and in the Kissimmee River valley in the Florida Peninsula. While the Belle Glade culture resembles in many aspects its neighbors, the Caloosahatchee and Glades cultures, it is characterized by many sites with complex earthworks of a unique style.

While there is some controversial evidence that the people of the Glades culture grew maize for a while, they relied primarily, if not exclusively, on fishing, hunting and gathering for food. They used pottery, but had few types that were distinct from neighboring cultures. Like other cultures in southern Florida, they had little access to stones suitable for making edged tools, and relied heavily on seashells and bone for tools.

During the historic period (after first contact with the Spanish), at least part of the Belle Glade culture area was politically subject to the Caloosa chiefdom. There was very little European contact with the area throughout the first Spanish period in Florida, and the last of the inhabitants of the area probably went to Cuba when the Spanish left Florida in 1763.

== Geographic context ==
The Belle Glade culture area existed in the Okeechobee region in south-central Florida. The region includes a broad area around Lake Okeechobee and the Kissimmee River Basin to north to Lake Tohopekaliga, including all of what is now Okeechobee County and parts of Glades, Hendry, Highlands, Martin, Osceola, Palm Beach, and Polk counties. The region includes the northern part of the Everglades and the upper (eastern) part of the Caloosahatchee River basin. It has poor, sandy soils, low elevation with low relief (with some higher relief on the Lake Wales Ridge along the western edge of the Kissimmee Valley), and many bodies of water and wetlands. The area consists of pine and palmetto flatwoods, wet prairies, hammocks of live oak and cabbage palm, and cypress swamps.

The cultural area is defined on the basis of a unique combination of mounds, earthworks and pottery, which have been found around Lake Okeechobee and as far north as Lake Tohopekaliga. Eastern Martin and Palm Beach counties, sometimes called the East Okeechobee area, may have also been part of the Belle Glade culture, based on the presence of high numbers of Belle Glade type pottery. Robert Carr states that, at least after 1000, The culture of the East Okeechobee area was more closely tied to the Indian River (or Malabar) and St. Johns cultures to the north than to the Belle Glade culture.

The Kissimee River is the major source of flow into Lake Okeechobee. Other streams flowing into the lake include Fisheating Creek, Taylor Creek, and Van Swearingen Creek. The Kissimmee River-Lake Okeechobee watershed covers 720,000 square kilometres. The surface area of the lake varies between 12,500 and 15,000 square kilometres, as the level of the lake varies generally between 3 and 4 metres above sea level. Water flows from the lake southward into the Everglades.

== Earthworks ==
Large complexes of mounds and earthworks have been found throughout the Belle Glade culture area. Smaller complexes of earthworks and mounds have often been found associated with hammocks, and occasionally in wet prairies. Mound and earthworks sites were often adjacent to sloughs or canoe trails. Robert Carr classified Belle Glade earthworks in three groups: linear ridges, circular-linear earthworks, and circular earthworks. Linear ridges are ridges or embankments created by piling dirt from ditches. They range from 15 to 730 metres in length. The ridges may be individual or in parallel groups. Ridges typically are found on savannahs or flood-plains that would have been periodically flooded during late pre-historic times. Linear ridges also occur as part of circular-linear earthworks. Circular-linear earthworks consist of curved ridges or embankments in the shape of a semi-circle, crescent, or horseshoe, usually with linear ridges radiating out from the curved ridge. Most of the sites are large, covering dozens of acres. Big Mound City and Tony's Mound are circular-linear earthworks. Radiocarbon dates for samples from the linear and curved ridges at Fort Center fell in the period 600 to 1400. Circular earthworks are ridges or embankments that form a circle or nearly complete circle, usually with an adjacent ditch. They range from 61 to 366 metres in diameter. Samples from the circular earthworks at Fort Center fell in the period 1000 to 450 BCE.

William Johnson expanded that classification system using mounds, ditches, borrows, and embankments as elements. Groupings of those elements variously appear in circular ditches, circular-linear earthworks (types A and B), linear embankments, square-rectangular earthworks, and mound groups.

=== Elements ===
Mounds are found throughout the Belle Glade area. Middens were primarily habitation sites. Some constructed mounds were used for burials, while others appear to have been architectural elements in larger earthworks. Some mounds contained few, if any artifacts. Others held sherds, shell tools, projectile points, and human teeth, and some of the latest constructed mounds held objects made of metals recovered from Spanish shipwrecks. Ditches have been found forming circles and rectangles. Many of the ditches had berms on one or both sides. Many of the ditches are interrupted by short unexcavated segments termed "causeways". Two rectangular and one "square" ditch have been found near the Kissimmee River in Okeechobee County. Another type of ditch, canals suitable for canoes, have been identified in southern Florida. In the Belle Glade culture area, two such canals connect the Ortona site to different points on the Caloosahatchee River.

Borrows are poorly documented in the Belle Glade culture area. Some have only been identified from old aerial photographs, and have since been destroyed by human activity. A number of the borrows were round. Some crescent-shaped borrows have also been found, usually partly wrapped around a mound. Round and crescent shaped borrows are always associated with other earthworks. Two isolated borrows are the Pestle Earthwork, shaped like the silhouette of a pestle with a handle and a wedge-shaped head, and the Oxer Borrow, which appears to be two wide ditches forming a cross with a crescent-shaped borrow at one end of the longer ditch. Embankments are very common at sites in the Belle Glade area. Most are linear, but some are curved. They are almost always found at sites with other elements, usually connecting to such elements to form complex earthworks. At some larger sites, linear embankments connect curved embankments to mounds. While some linear embankments are not associated with other elements, curved elements always are, either connected to linear embankments or enclosing mounds.

=== Types ===
Circular ditches usually have one or more mounds within the circle. Two overlapping circular ditches are enclosed in the Great Circle at Fort Center. Some circular ditches have circular borrows around the outside rim of the circle (Johnson states that these may be later additions). The West Okeechobee Circle has linear features attached to the circle (Johnson states that it may be transitional between circular ditches and circular-linear earthworks). Mounds, embankments, borrows, and ditches are combined in circular-linear earthworks. Both linear and curved embankments may be connected to mounds. Borrows surround mounds and are in contact with the rims of curved embankments. Ditches run between borrows. Johnson distinguishes two types of circular-linear earthworks. Type A, the earlier type, consisted of a curved embankment with an attached linear embankment connecting it to mound used for habitation. This form typically had a midden opposite the curved embankment. Type B had multiple linear embankments radiating like spokes of a wheel. Linear embankments are sometimes found separate from other elements at some sites, but are usually attached to a mound at one end. Linear embankments lead to the center of the two rectangular ditches. Many sites in the Belle Glade area have groups of mounds. Many of the mounds were habitation mounds, and often have a midden layer over a constructed mound.

== Sites ==
Major archaeological sites of the Belle Glade culture include the Belle Glade site (Palm Beach County), Big Mound City (Palm Beach County), the Boynton Mound complex (Palm Beach County), Fort Center (Glades County), Ortona (Glades County), and Tony's Mound (Hendry County). The Belle Glade site, 1.5 miles (2.4 km) west of the city of Belle Glade, which gave its name to the culture, and Big Mound City, 15 miles (24 km) south of Belle Glade, were partially excavated in 1933 and 1934 by a Civil Works Administration project supervised by Matthew Stirling. A report and analysis of the two sites was published by Gordon Willey in 1948. The best known site, Fort Center, was the subject of major excavations under the direction of William Sears during the 1970s. Other sites are known from test excavations and/or aerial surveys.

Other sites of middens, mounds, and/or other earthworks include:

- Air Force Mound (Highlands County)
- Barker Site (Polk County)
- Barley Barber (Martin County)
- Big Gopher (Palm Beach County)
- Bluff Hammock (Highlands County)
- Buck Island (Highlands County)
- Circle Canal Site/Caloosahatchee Circle (Glades County}
- Clemens Square and Mound (Okeechobee County)
- Clewiston Mounds (Hendry County)
- Daugherty (Highlands County)
- Dead Cow (Highlands County)
- Eversbach Midden (Polk County)
- Fischer Site (Polk County)
- Fort Kissimmee Earthworks (Okeechobee County)
- Fulford Earthworks (Okeechobee County)
- Gaging Station (Highlands County)
- Highlands Linear Ridge (Highlands County)
- Highlands Parallel Ridges (Highlands County)
- Kissimmee Circle (Okeechobee County)
- Lakeport Circle Ditch (Glades County)
- Lakeport Earthworks (Glades County)
- Lonesome Island (Highlands County)
- Maple Mound (Hendry County)
- Mulberry Mound (Glades County)
- Nicodemus Earthworks (Glades County)
- North Fisheating Creek Circle (Glades County)
- Orange Hammock (Highlands County)
- Palmdale Earthworks (Glades County)
- Pestle Earthwork (Glades County)
- Oxer Borrow (Glades County)
- River Ranch Midden (Polk County)
- South Lake Mounds (Hendry County)
- Summer Earthworks (Hendry County)
- Underhill Sawgrass Pond Site (Okeechobee County)
- West Okeechobee Circle (Glades County)
- Whitehurst Mound (Okeechobee County)

== Chronology ==
Humans apparently first entered the Lake Okeechobee basin and Kissimmee River valley late in the Archaic period (although there are hints of an earlier, even Paleo-Indian presence). (Note: Aceramic sites from 3000 BCE or earlier have been found along the southwest Florida coast, in the Big Cypress, and at the Peace Camp site in western Broward County.) Based on a perceived similarity of circular ditches at Belle Glade sites with raised agricultural fields in South America, Sears proposed that the Belle Glade people migrated from somewhere in South America to the Okeechobee basin at the end of the Archaic period. Based on the presence of semi-fiber-tempered pottery in the earliest mounds preceding the appearance of circular ditches in the area, Johnson argues instead that people from what became the St. Johns culture area moved into the previously uninhabited Okeechobee basin and Kissimmee River valley at that time. (Note: Pottery had been used in the St. Johns River valley to the north since the beginning of the Orange period (2000–500 BCE), about 1,000 years before it appeared in the Okeechobee basin. The earliest pottery found in southern Florida is fiber-tempered or semi-fiber-tempered, the latter made with a mix of fiber and sand temper. The semi-fiber-tempered pottery is regarded as transitional between the fiber-tempered pottery of the Orange period and the sand-tempered pottery of the Belle Glade and Glades types.)

The Belle Glade culture is defined as beginning about 1000 BCE. The older Willey/Bullen chronology divided the Belle Glade culture into three periods; Transitional (1000 – 500 BCE), Belle Glade I (500 BCE – 1000 CE) and Belle Glade II (1000–1700). The more recent Sears chronology divides the Belle Glade culture into four periods; I (1000 BCE – 200 CE), II (200 – c. 700), III (c. 700 – c. 1300) and IV (c. 1300–1700).

Johnson presents a modified chronology based on pottery types, earthworks types, and, where available, radiocarbon dating. Johnson's periods for the culture are:

- Transitional/Belle Glade Transitional period (1000–500 BCE), characterized by mounds, circular ditches, and semi-fiber-tempered pottery.
- Belle Glade 1a (500 BCE – 200 CE), characterized by sand-tempered pottery.
- Belle Glade 1b (200–1000), characterized by Type A circular-linear earthworks and Belle Glade Plain pottery.
- Belle Glade 2a (1000 to sometime in the 16th century), characterized by Type B circular-linear earthworks and the presence of St. Johns Check-Stamped pottery, although Belle Glade Plain pottery still predominates.
- Belle Glade 2b (later 16th and 17th centuries), characterized by linear embankments ending in mounds and the presence of European artifacts.

During the period of European contact, the Mayaimi lived around Lake Okeechobee, and the Jaega lived in the East Okeechobee area. Almost nothing is known of the inhabitants of the Kissimmee Valley during the historic period.

== Artifacts and mounds ==
Most of the pottery found at Belle Glade culture sites is plain, undecorated (Belle Glade Plain and Glades Plain styles). Wood, bone, shell and shark tooth artifacts have been found at a few Belle Glade sites, but are too few to be used in defining the culture.

Earthworks are diagnostic of the Belle Glade culture. Circular ditches appeared early in the Belle Glade culture, by 500 BCE. Habitation mounds and burials in mounds also date to the earliest period. Mounds were also built in Sears' periods II and IV, with mound burials again in period IV. In period IV complexes of mounds and linear embankments were common. Habitation mounds served as dry refuges from flooding during the wet season. Middens are found in oak hammocks near open water.

In 2013, Victor D. Thompson and Thomas J. Pluckhahn researched the Fort Center site. Besides finding additional mounds and features, their dating showed that Sears' dates were off by 1300 years. The great circle was started around 800 B.C. and soon after the mortuary mound/pond complex was built. These new dates likewise change the chronology. Glade II would have started 800-500 B.C. and would indicate that St. Johns and Weeden Island II culture likewise was earlier.

== Subsistence ==
The people of the Belle Glade culture subsisted on hunting and gathering. Animals in the diet included deer, turtle, snake, fish and fresh water mollusks. While maize may have been cultivated, it was no more than a minor component of the diet.

== Historiography and Scholarly Debate ==
There is little evidence to support the idea that there was a separate and distinct Belle Glade culture. The sites other than Fort Center necessary to support the theory have never been excavated in the almost sixty years after Sears' work and conclusions at Fort Center in the 1960s. The literature does however reveal an attempt by Sears and others to distance the Calusa culture from any and all of the earthwork projects in the Lake Okeechobee Basin area. Based on the archaeology from 1895 to 1945, a view of a single south Florida culture region was established, based on a predominant type of plain ceramics in the region as early as 950 BC in Perico Island and up to 1700 at Marco Island. By 1949 both Gordon Willet and John Goggin authored complete taxonomies and chronologies for the Glades region. Goggin's dates which began earlier, seem to be closer to the actual dates for the various southern sequences.

In 1960, John Goggin and William Sturtevant argued that the Calusa and the lake culture worked together. The same decade, William Sears set out to disprove this commonly held view. In 1980 Sturtevant and Jerald Milanich changed the taxonomy adding two additional culture regions, Okeechobee and Caloosahatchee, making the Glade region smaller and more southern. Vague references to the monumental ceremonial mound complexes were used to support the change. No new archaeology and data resulted in the changed taxonomy. In 2000, state archaeologist Ryan Wheeler authored yet another south Florida taxonomy adding more regions and totally eliminating a Glades Region. Recently, University of Florida graduate student Nathan Lawres 2015, 2017, 2018), has undertaken research and dating of the Okeechobee region. Besides referencing the prehistoric inhabitants by name, the Mayaimi, Lawres sees "alignments" between the Calusa and the Mayaimi, thus bringing the archaeology full circle to the original view. Subsequent research will definitively prove or disprove the existence in fact of a separate Belle Glade culture beginning in 1000 BC and who engineered the monumental mound complexes independently.

== Sources ==
- Austin, Robert M. (June 1996). "Ceramic Seriation, Radiocarbon Dates and Subsistence Data for the Kissimmee River Valley: Archaeological Evidence for a Belle Glade Occupation". The Florida Anthropologist. 49 (2): 65–87 – via University of Florida Digital Collections.
- Butler, David. "A Lip and Rim Shape Sub-Sample from the Belle Glade Archaeological Culture". Kissimmee Valley Archaeological and Historical Conservancy. Archived from the original on 23 March 2012.
- Carr, Robert S. (December 1985). "Prehistoric Circular Earthworks in South Florida". The Florida Anthropologist. 38 (4): 288–301 – via University of Florida Digital Collections.
- Carr, Robert S. (2012). "Mississippian Influence in the Glades, Belle Glade, and East Okeechobee Areas of South Florida". In Ashley, Keith; White, Nancy Marie (eds.). Late Prehistoric Florida: Archaeology at the Edge of the Mississippian World. Gainesville, Florida: University Press of Florida. pp. 62–80. ISBN 978-0-8130-4014-1.
- Goggin, John M. (1950). "Florida Archaeology-1950". The Florida Anthropologist. 3 (1–2): 9–20.
- Griffin, John W. (2002). Milanich, Jerald T.; Miller, James J (eds.). Archaeology of the Everglades. Gainesville, Florida: University Press of Florida. ISBN 0-8130-2558-3.
- Hanna, Alfred Jackson; Hanna, Kathryn Abbey (1948). Lake Okeechobee: Wellspring of the Everglades. Bobbs-Merrill.
- Johnson, William G. (1992). "Part II: Archaeological Contexts: Chapter 11. Lake Okeechobee Basin/Kissimmee River, 3000 B.P. to Contact". Florida's Cultural Heritage: A View of the Past. Tallahassee, Florida: Division of Historical Resources, Florida Department of State. pp. 81–90. Archived from the original on March 29, 2012.
- Johnson, William Gray (December 1996). "A Belle Glade Earthwork Typology and Chronology". The Florida Anthropologist. 49 (4): 249–260 – via University of Florida Digital Collections.
- Lyon, Edwin A. (1996). A New Deal for Southeastern Archaeology. Tuscaloosa, AL: The University of Alabama Press. ISBN 978-0-8173-8381-7.
- McGoun, William E (1991). Prehistoric Peoples of South Florida. Tuscaloosa, Alabama: The University of Alabama Press. ISBN 0-8173-0686-2.
- Milanich, Jerald T. (1994). Archaeology of Precolumbian Florida. Gainesville, FL: University press of Florida. ISBN 0-8130-1273-2. Reissued 2017 ISBN 978-1-947372-71-9.
- "Settlement Patterns". www.pbchistoryonline.org.
- Rochelo, Mark J.; Davenport, Christian; Selch, Donna (June 2015). "Revealing pre-historic Native American Belle Glade earthworks in the Northern Everglades utilizing airborne LiDAR". Journal of Archaeological Science: Reports. 2: 624–643. doi:10.1016/j.jasrep.2014.11.009. ISSN 2352-409X.
- Sassaman, Kenneth E. (March 2003). "New AMS Dates on Orange Fiber-Tempered Pottery from the Middle St.Johns Valley and Their Implications for Cultural History in Northeast Florida". The Florida Anthropologist. 56 (1): 5–13.
- Sears, William H. (1994). Fort Center: An Archaeological Site in the Lake Okeechobee Basin. Gainesville, FL: University Press of Florida. ISBN 0-8130-1298-8.
- Wheeler, Ryan J. (2000). Treasure of the Calusa. Tallahassee, Florida: Ryan J. Wheeler. pp. 9–16. ISBN 0-9701550-0-X.
- Thompson, Victor D.; Pluckhahn, Thomas J. (2014). "The Modification and Manipulation of Landscape at Fort Center". In Wallis, Neill J.; Randall, Asa R. (eds.). New Histories of Pre-Columbian Florida. Gainesville, FL: The University Press of Florida. pp. 163–82. doi:10.5744/florida/9780813049366.003.0009. ISBN 978-0-8130-4936-6.
