= Mayaimi =

Native American people

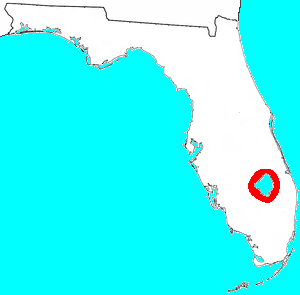
Approximate territory of the Mayaimi tribe

The Mayaimi (also Maymi, Maimi) were Native American people who lived around Lake Mayaimi (now Lake Okeechobee) in the Belle Glade area of Florida from the beginning of the Common Era until the 17th or 18th century. In the languages of the Mayaimi, Calusa, and Tequesta tribes, Mayaimi meant "big water." The origin of the Calusa language has not been determined, as the meanings of only ten words were recorded before extinction. The current name, Okeechobee, is derived from the Hitchiti word meaning "big water". The Mayaimis have no linguistic or cultural relationship with the Miami people of the Great Lakes region. The city of Miami is named after the Miami River, which derived its name from Lake Mayaimi.

== History ==
The Mayaimis built ceremonial and village earthwork mounds around Lake Okeechobee similar to those of the Mississippian culture and earlier mound builders. Fort Center is in the area occupied by the Mayaimis in historic times. They dug many canals as other earthworks, to use as pathways for their canoes. The dugout canoes were a platform type with shovel-shaped ends, resembling those used in Central America and the West Indies, rather than the pointed-end canoes used by other peoples in the southeastern United States.

Hernando de Escalante Fontaneda, who lived with the tribes of southern Florida for seventeen years in the 16th century, said that the Mayaimis lived in many towns of thirty or forty inhabitants each, and that there were many more places where only a few people lived. The game and fish of Lake Okeechobee provided most of the Mayaimis' food. They used fishing weirs and ate black bass, eels, American alligator tails, Virginia opossum, terrapins and snakes, and processed coontie for flour. In high-water season they lived on their mounds and ate only fish.

At the beginning of the 18th century, raiders from the Creek and Yammasee, allies of the Province of Carolina, repeatedly launched raids in Spanish Florida, burning villages, and capturing or killing members of all Florida tribes down to the southern end of the Florida peninsula. They sold the captives into slavery, destined for markets from Boston to Barbados. In 1710, a group of 280 refugees from Florida that included the Cacique of "Maimi" arrived in Cuba. In 1738, the Maymi had a "fort" on the coast south of Cape Canaveral. In 1743, Spanish missionaries sent to Biscayne Bay reported that a remnant of the Mayaimis (which they called Maimies or Maymíes) were part a group of about 100 people, which also included Santaluzos and Mayaca people, still lived four days north of the Miami River. Any survivors were presumed to have been evacuated to Cuba when Spain lost control of Florida in the Treaty of Paris in 1763.

Several archaeological sites are known from the area occupied by the Mayaimi, including Fort Center, Belle Glade, Big Mound City, the Boynton Mounds complex, Ortona Prehistoric Village, and Tony's Mound.
