= Blueberry Site =

Blueberry site is an archaeological site of an American Indian culture called Belle Glade culture, which lasted roughly 2700 years (approximately 1000 B.C. to A.D. 1700). The site is located along the eastern edge of an upland ridge adjacent to a substantial wetland in southeast Highlands County, Florida. Archaeological research on the site started in the early 1930s.

== Cultural and Temporal Context ==
The temporal span of Belle Glade culture, in general, can be divided into four periods: Belle Glade I from 1000 B.C. to A.D. 200, Belle Glade II from A.D.200 to A.D. 600 or 800, Belle Glade III from A.D. 600 or 800 to A.D. 1200 or 1400, Belle Glade IV from A.D.1200 or 1400 to A.D. 1700. Archaeologists made these divisions based on varying factors including settlement patterns and landscape alternations. Serving as an indicator, an intact cultural stratum demonstrated the integrity and continuity of the primary Belle Glade occupation. Construction commonly took place during the primary occupation period, including at least three earthen mounds and at least one linear ridge/embankment/occupation mound. Under the consideration of the viability of the diverse landscape, the Blueberry site might be of a village size. It is not very likely to be an isolated community.

With the discovery of exotic artifacts and analysis of the hearth features, archaeologists believe that the residents at the Blueberry site developed trade networks with distant groups. Moreover, according to the Fort Centre site within the Belle Glade region, the exotic artifacts were likely to be possessed by elites, so the Belle Glade culture probably view the items from long-distant importation as prestige ones. Besides prestige items, inhabitants on the Blueberry site shared cultural similarities with other groups of American Indians. Studying the red ocher recovered from the midden stratum and the ceramics, rituals, and ceremony had a lot in common. Meanwhile, the analysis of hearth samples and the faunal assemblage proved the consistent subsistence strategy over time. The Belle Glade communities harvested aquatic resources such as fish and turtles as well as upland resources such as deer and turkey.

== Case Study ==
To figure out the influence of geomorphological characteristics of the landscape on human behavior, in 2014, archaeologists conducted a case study on the Blueberry site. They studied lithic assemblages to see how Belle Glade inhabitants on the Blueberry site dealt with environmental constraints since this site lacked available lithic raw materials. From the diagnostic lithics recovered from the midden matrix, the archaeologists concluded that a lot of nearly complete tools were imported to the site. They also found evidence of Blueberry lithic manufacture at a late stage. The lithic assemblages supported the hypothesis that Pecora’s Reduction Juncture Model can describe the Blueberry site. However, they did not agree with Pecora that in a region of devoid tool-stone source, there would be a sequence of reduction relative to local resource.
