= Pioneer, Florida =

- Census-designated place
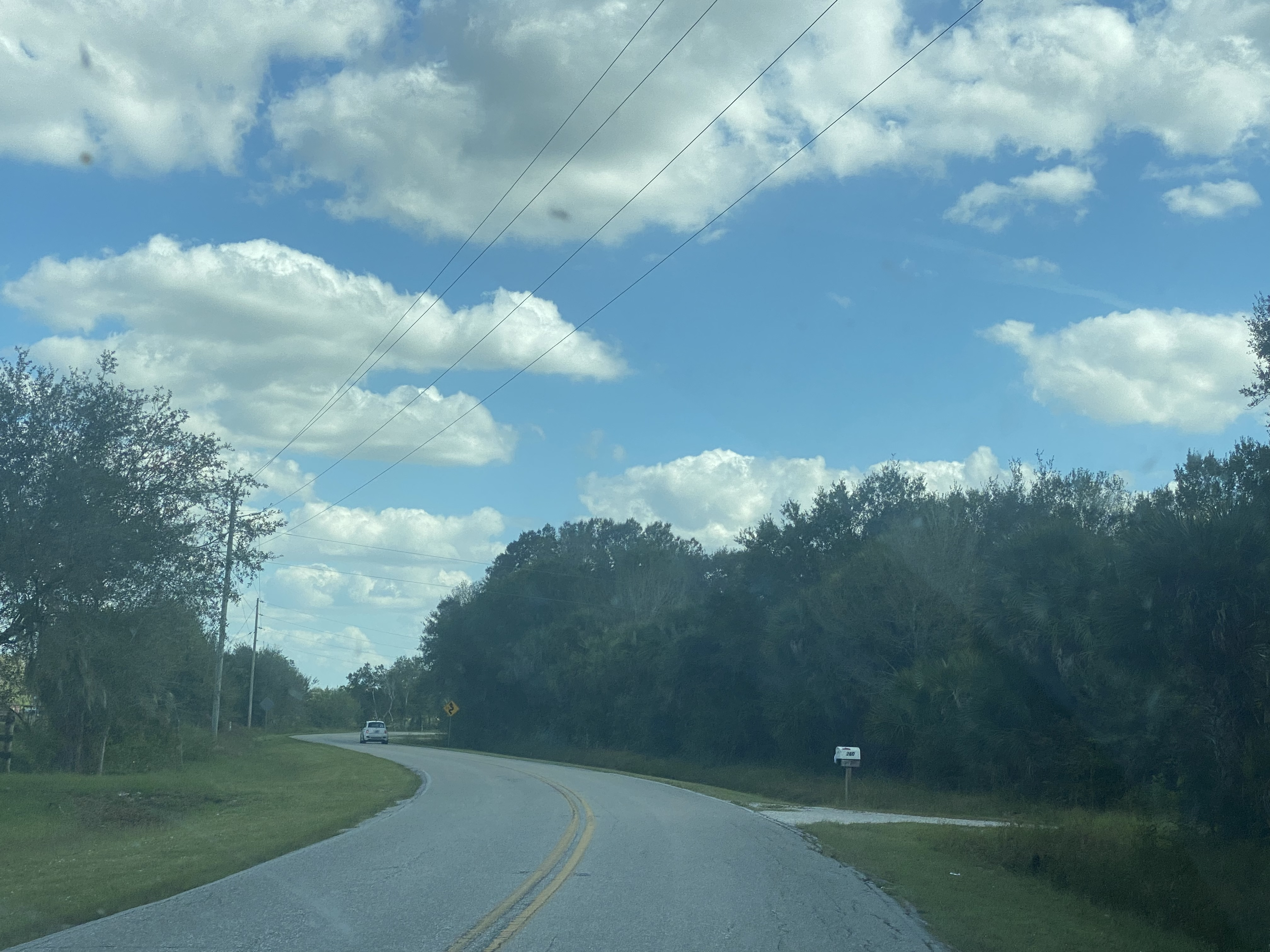
- Hendry Isles Blvd in Pioneer

- Location within Florida Location within the United States
- Coordinates: 26°43′33″N 81°13′08″W
- Country: United States
- State: Florida
- County: Hendry

Area
  - Total: 21.17 sq mi (54.82 km^{2})
  - Land: 21.16 sq mi (54.80 km^{2})
  - Water: 0.012 sq mi (0.03 km^{2})
- Elevation: 20 ft (6.1 m)

Population (2020)
  - Total: 752
  - Density: 35.5/sq mi (13.72/km^{2})
- Time zone: UTC-5 (Eastern (EST))
  - Summer (DST): UTC-4 (EDT)
- Area code: 863
- GNIS feature ID: 2583375

Pioneer, also known as Pioneer Plantation, is an unincorporated community and census-designated place in Hendry County, Florida, United States. Its population was 752 as of the 2020 census, up from 697 at the 2010 census. It is part of the Clewiston, Florida Micropolitan Statistical Area (μSA).

== Geography ==
According to the U.S. Census Bureau, the community has an area of 21.233 square miles (54.99 km^{2}); 21.223 square miles (54.97 km^{2}) of its area is land, and 0.010 square miles (0.026 km^{2}) is water.

Pioneer has the Pioneer Community Park at 910 Panama Avenue. It includes a 2,400 square feet community center, basketball court, playground equipment, 2 grills, and picnic tables.

== Demographics ==
Historical population
Census	Pop.	Note	%±
2010	697		—
2020	752		7.9%
U.S. Decennial Census

Pioneer first appeared as a census designated place in the 2010 U.S. census.
