= Port LaBelle, Florida =

- Census-designated place
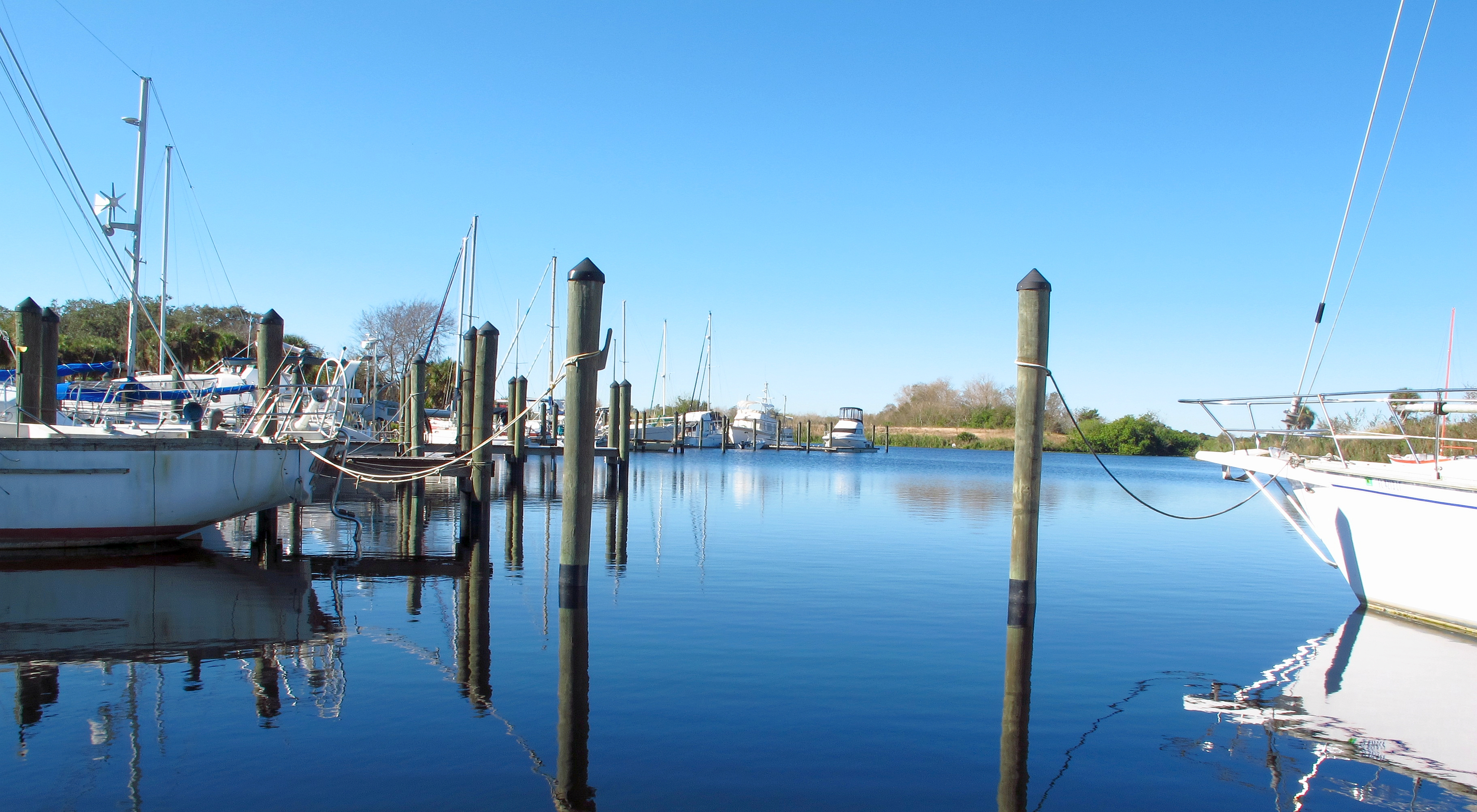
- Port LaBelle Marina

- Location in Hendry County and the state of Florida
- Coordinates: 26°45′23″N 81°22′34″W
- Country: United States
- State: Florida
- Counties: Hendry, Glades

Area
  - Total: 10.92 sq mi (28.27 km^{2})
  - Land: 10.74 sq mi (27.82 km^{2})
  - Water: 0.17 sq mi (0.45 km^{2})
- Elevation: 16 ft (4.9 m)

Population (2020)
  - Total: 5,450
  - Density: 507.3/sq mi (195.87/km^{2})
- Time zone: UTC-5 (Eastern (EST))
  - Summer (DST): UTC-4 (EDT)
- ZIP code: 33935
- Area code: 863
- FIPS code: 12-58420
- GNIS feature ID: 2403438

Port LaBelle is a census-designated place (CDP) in Hendry and Glades counties, Florida, United States. The population was 5,450 at the 2020 census, up from 3,530 at the 2010 census. It is part of the Clewiston, Florida Micropolitan Statistical Area (μSA).

== Geography ==
Port LaBelle is located in northern Hendry County and extends north into Glades County. It is bordered to the west by the city of LaBelle. Florida State Road 80 runs through the northern part of the community, leading east 30 miles (48 km) to Clewiston and west through LaBelle 32 miles (51 km) to Fort Myers.

According to the United States Census Bureau, the CDP has a total area of 8.2 square miles (21.2 km^{2}), all land.

== Demographics ==
Historical population
Census	Pop.	Note	%±
1990	1,512		—
2000	3,050		101.7%
2010	3,530		15.7%
2020	5,450		54.4%
U.S. Decennial Census

=== 2020 census ===
As of the 2020 census, Port LaBelle had a population of 5,450. The median age was 32.1 years. 30.6% of residents were under the age of 18 and 12.6% of residents were 65 years of age or older. For every 100 females there were 100.1 males, and for every 100 females age 18 and over there were 95.0 males age 18 and over.

54.7% of residents lived in urban areas, while 45.3% lived in rural areas.

There were 1,767 households in Port LaBelle, of which 45.4% had children under the age of 18 living in them. Of all households, 51.9% were married-couple households, 14.9% were households with a male householder and no spouse or partner present, and 24.9% were households with a female householder and no spouse or partner present. About 18.4% of all households were made up of individuals and 9.1% had someone living alone who was 65 years of age or older.

There were 1,968 housing units, of which 10.2% were vacant. The homeowner vacancy rate was 2.4% and the rental vacancy rate was 12.2%.

Racial composition as of the 2020 census
Race	Number	Percent
White	2,714	49.8%
Black or African American	330	6.1%
American Indian and Alaska Native	68	1.2%
Asian	54	1.0%
Native Hawaiian and Other Pacific Islander	0	0.0%
Some other race	1,053	19.3%
Two or more races	1,231	22.6%
Hispanic or Latino (of any race)	3,087	56.6%

=== 2000 census ===
As of the census of 2000, there were 3,050 people, 879 households, and 700 families residing in the CDP. The population density was 354.0 inhabitants per square mile (136.7/km^{2}). There were 973 housing units at an average density of 112.9 per square mile (43.6/km^{2}). The racial makeup of the CDP was 70.33% White, 10.66% African American, 0.69% Native American, 0.66% Asian, 13.84% from other races, and 3.84% from two or more races. Hispanic or Latino of any race were 44.30% of the population.

There were 879 households, out of which 44.1% had children under the age of 18 living with them, 57.7% were married couples living together, 15.5% had a female householder with no husband present, and 20.3% were non-families. 15.0% of all households were made up of individuals, and 6.5% had someone living alone who was 65 years of age or older. The average household size was 3.20 and the average family size was 3.41.

In the CDP, the population was spread out, with 31.3% under the age of 18, 15.2% from 18 to 24, 28.2% from 25 to 44, 14.4% from 45 to 64, and 10.9% who were 65 years of age or older. The median age was 27 years. For every 100 females, there were 120.7 males. For every 100 females age 18 and over, there were 124.9 males.

The median income for a household in the CDP was $34,167, and the median income for a family was $36,974. Males had a median income of $25,104 versus $16,484 for females. The per capita income for the CDP was $13,704. About 13.8% of families and 22.5% of the population were below the poverty line, including 20.4% of those under age 18 and 16.0% of those age 65 or over.
