= Harlem, Florida =

- Census-designated place
- Location in Hendry County and the state of Florida
- Coordinates: 26°43′57″N 80°57′07″W
- Country: United States
- State: Florida
- County: Hendry

Area
  - Total: 1.05 sq mi (2.73 km^{2})
  - Land: 1.05 sq mi (2.73 km^{2})
  - Water: 0 sq mi (0.00 km^{2})
- Elevation: 20 ft (6.1 m)
- Time zone: UTC-5 (Eastern (EST))
  - Summer (DST): UTC-4 (EDT)
- ZIP code: 33440
- Area code: 863
- FIPS code: 12-28925
- GNIS feature ID: 2402567

Harlem is a census-designated place (CDP) in Hendry County, Florida, United States. It was established in 1926, and its population is predominantly African American. The population was 2,441 at the 2020 census, down from 2,658 at the 2010 census. It is part of the Clewiston, Florida Micropolitan Statistical Area (μSA).

== History ==
In 1926, a Black settlement on Lake Okeechobee was relocated into what is now Harlem. By the mid 1920s, sugar had become the predominant agricultural crop in Southern Florida. Harlem, Florida was established around 1928 under the name "Townsite", as a camp for the sugar plantation workers, and it is historically a Black town.

The Harlem Academy was the main school for the community. In the 1971, the Harlem Academy closed after racial integration, and the Harlem students were bussed to Clewiston, Florida. A.A. Thomas and his wife Lois Thomas were largely responsible for the Harlem Academy, and after the closure they opened a local day care.

== Geography ==
Harlem is located in northeastern Hendry County. It is bordered to the north by the city of Clewiston. According to the United States Census Bureau, the CDP has a total area of 1.06 square miles (2.75 km^{2}), all land.

== Demographics ==
Historical population
Census	Pop.	Note	%±
1990	2,826		—
2000	2,730		−3.4%
2010	2,658		−2.6%
2020	2,441		−8.2%
U.S. Decennial Census

=== Racial and ethnic composition ===
Harlem CDP, Florida – Racial and ethnic composition Note: the US Census treats Hispanic/Latino as an ethnic category. This table excludes Latinos from the racial categories and assigns them to a separate category. Hispanics/Latinos may be of any race.
Race / Ethnicity (NH = Non-Hispanic)	Pop 2000	Pop 2010	Pop 2020	% 2000	% 2010	% 2020
White alone (NH)	29	24	39	1.06%	0.90%	1.60%
Black or African American alone (NH)	2,587	2,539	2,289	94.76%	95.52%	93.77%
Native American or Alaska Native alone (NH)	5	4	6	0.18%	0.15%	0.25%
Asian alone (NH)	1	1	0	0.04%	0.04%	0.00%
Native Hawaiian or Pacific Islander alone (NH)	0	0	0	0.00%	0.00%	0.00%
Other race alone (NH)	0	0	0	0.00%	0.00%	0.00%
Mixed race or Multiracial (NH)	36	9	25	1.32%	0.34%	1.02%
Hispanic or Latino (any race)	72	81	82	2.64%	3.05%	3.36%
Total	2,730	2,658	2,441	100.00%	100.00%	100.00%

=== 2020 census ===
As of the 2020 census, Harlem had a population of 2,441. The median age was 34.1 years. 30.4% of residents were under the age of 18 and 14.1% of residents were 65 years of age or older. For every 100 females there were 87.2 males, and for every 100 females age 18 and over there were 77.2 males age 18 and over.

95.2% of residents lived in urban areas, while 4.8% lived in rural areas.

There were 854 households in Harlem, of which 39.8% had children under the age of 18 living in them. Of all households, 27.2% were married-couple households, 20.5% were households with a male householder and no spouse or partner present, and 44.0% were households with a female householder and no spouse or partner present. About 26.2% of all households were made up of individuals and 10.8% had someone living alone who was 65 years of age or older.

There were 930 housing units, of which 8.2% were vacant. The homeowner vacancy rate was 0.0% and the rental vacancy rate was 4.3%.

=== 2000 census ===
As of the census of 2000, there were 2,730 people, 877 households, and 644 families residing in the CDP. The population density was 2,820.9 inhabitants per square mile (1,089.2/km^{2}). There were 926 housing units at an average density of 956.8 per square mile (369.4/km^{2}). The racial makeup of the CDP was 95.38% African American, 2.31% White, 0.18% Native American, 0.11% Asian, 0.51% from other races, and 1.50% from two or more races. Hispanic or Latino of any race were 2.64% of the population.

There were 877 households, out of which 43.6% had children under the age of 18 living with them, 31.9% were [married couples living together, 35.1% had a female householder with no husband present, and 26.5% were non-families. 22.6% of all households were made up of individuals, and 7.6% had someone living alone who was 65 years of age or older. The average household size was 3.11 and the average family size was 3.67.

In the CDP, the population was spread out, with 39.5% under the age of 18, 10.0% from 18 to 24, 24.1% from 25 to 44, 18.1% from 45 to 64, and 8.3% who were 65 years of age or older. The median age was 25 years. For every 100 females, there were 88.5 males. For every 100 females age 18 and over, there were 78.0 males.

The median income for a household in the CDP was $21,232, and the median income for a family was $22,574. Males had a median income of $21,771 versus $20,156 for females. The per capita income for the CDP was $11,571. About 31.2% of families and 40.4% of the population were below the poverty line, including 58.6% of those under age 18 and 23.0% of those age 65 or over.
