= Tony's Mound =

Archaeological site in Florida, United States

Tony's Mound (Also Big Mound Circle) (8HN3) is a prehistoric to historic period archaeological site located on Dixie Dyke Road, south of Clewiston in Hendry County, Florida. Tony's Mound is one of two monumental earthwork complexes built in southern Florida by the Glade cultures around 1000 BCE using unique and distinct sand ridges, causeways and mounds. The other site is Big Mound City, twenty-five miles to the northeast in Palm Beach County. The ritual complex was first described in print by Ross Allen in the 1948. Aerial photography showed a site consisting of nine raised causeways radiating from an immense plaza and central flat mound/midden on privately owned land used for cattle ranching.

== History ==
In 1946, Ross Allen planned a ten-day expedition with George Espenlaub, Ned Moren, George J. Leahy, Bob Morrow, and George Marnhout. Before setting out, George Marnhout flew over the site while Lawrence Bright filmed and photographed from the plane. The group traveled all day on swamp buggies until they set up camp under a hammock, ten minutes from the mounds.

During their visit, they found the grassy site to be very dry, about three miles northeast of cypress swamps. Allen reports that the area was "so extensive, that it cannot be seen in its entirety from the ground, but as we measured and walked over the area, we became more fascinated by this strange group." He also reported that the mound was 580 feet diameter with circumference of 1665 feet. He said that a "roadway-like embankment" was about 10 to 15 feet wide. Allen further described "raised pathways," six feet in width, connecting the main circle to 19 to 22 smaller circles surrounding it. Beyond the mounds, Allen notes that there was a stand-alone "crescent-like raised earthwork."

On Tony's Mound, the main mound measuring 110 feet by 83 feet, they found sugarberries, banyan, mulberries, papaya, saw palmetto and other small plants. Extending from the north side of the mound, there was a "canal-like depression 600 feet long, flanked by spoil banks or raised pathways 30 feet in width." The largest mound was measured to be "390 feet in length and 135 feet wide; there is a small canal leading to it."

There was a potential burial mound about a quarter of a mile to the northwest, covered by trees and vegetation. Allen suspected that the area was surrounded by deep water, which "doubtless provided both fishing and water transportation" with "good hunting and palm materials for construction." He also notes that "wild turkey and deer abound" around the mounds. According to Allen, "there had been deep water next to the homes of the Indians, and that the canals certainly provided a waterway to the most important mounds," with the mounds being the only potential dry land.

From 1980 to the present, leading archaeologists, including Jerald T. Milanich, have referenced the site and its importance. Milanich used Tony's Mound as an example of engineering by the "Belle Glade culture". In 2014, after excavating the related Fort Center site in Glades County, Thompson and Pluckhahn concluded that Tony's Mound, Big Mound City and Fort Center represented the most important "earthworks built by hunter-gathers in world prehistory".
