= Fort Center =

Archaeological site in Florida, US

- Location within Florida today
- 26°57′2.66″N 81°8′10.97″W
- Location: Lakeport, Florida, Glades County, Florida, United States
- Region: Glades County, Florida

History
- Built: 450 BCE
- Abandoned: 1700 CE

Site notes
- Excavation dates: 1930s, 1940s, early 1950s, 1961, 1966-1971
- Archaeologists: John Goggin, William H. Sears University of Florida, Colgate University, Florida Atlantic University
- Responsible body: State of Florida

Fort Center is an archaeological site in Glades County, Florida, United States, a few miles northwest of Lake Okeechobee. It was occupied for more than 2,000 years, from 450 BCE until about 1700 CE. The inhabitants of Fort Center may have been cultivating maize centuries before it appeared anywhere else in Florida.

The area around Fisheating Creek was occupied by people of the Belle Glade culture from as early as 1000 BCE.

Fort Center is a complex of earthwork mounds, linear embankments, middens, circular ditches, and an artificial pond occupying an area approximately 1 mile (1.6 km) long and 0.5 miles (0.80 km) wide extending east–west along Fisheating Creek, a stream that empties unto Lake Okeechobee.

The site is named for a US Army fortification, "Fort Center", used during the Seminole Wars.

== Physical environment ==
The Fort Center site consists of three environments: a meander belt along the stream consisting of a floodplain swamp and natural levees, wet prairie, and oak-cabbage palm-saw palmetto hammocks. The floodplain and prairie are subject to frequent flooding. The prairie consists of two to four feet of sandy soil on a hardpan, resulting in poor drainage. The stream meander belt cuts below the hardpan.

Pollen evidence shows that the river meander belt and prairie existed in essentially their current condition since human occupation began 2,500 to 3,000 years ago until the 20th century. The area covered by hammocks has increased since sustained occupation ended around 1700. Much of the area around Fort Center was developed as improved pasture during the 20th century. Lake Okeechobee was surrounded by a system of dikes built during the 20th century, except for where Fisheating Creek enters the lake.

== Cultural environment ==
Fort Center is in the Lake Okeechobee Basin, an area that surrounds and drains into Lake Okeechobee, and is synonymous with the Belle Glade culture area, one of several related culture areas in southern Florida. The people of the Belle Glade culture occupied the area around Fisheating Creek from as early as 1000 BCE until historic times. The Kissimmee River valley is usually regarded as a sub-area of the Lake Okeechobee Basin (Belle Glade culture area). Sears treats the Lake Okeechobee Basin, including the Kissimmee River Valley, as a sub-region of the Glades culture area, while others place the Belle Glade (Lake Okeechobee) and Glades areas on an equal footing. The cultural traditions of southern Florida had a long history and were well adapted to the area. Archaeological evidence of changes in those cultures is mostly limited to small changes in the few ceramics that were decorated.

Mounds, ditches, canals and other earthworks have been found at a number of locations in interior southern Florida. More than thirty sites of the Belle Glade culture or its predecessors are known from the area around Fisheating Creek. A number of sites with extensive earthworks have been found in the Belle Glade culture area. At least seven other sites in southern Florida, including two near Fisheating Creek, have similar circular features, although none of them has been subject to detailed examination by archaeologists. McGoun quotes Stephen Hale as saying that complexes "with sequences of construction and architectural style almost identical to those at Fort Center" are found from Lake Tohopekaliga in the north to Palm Beach and Hendry counties to the south. There are also similarities between Fort Center and the Crystal River site. Milanich also notes resemblances between Period II Fort Center and contemporary Cades Pond culture sites at River Styx and Cross Creek in northern Florida.

Authors have sometimes postulated that the various mounds and other earthworks in the Belle Glade and Glades areas were constructed by or at least used by the Calusa. Archaeologists now generally discount that theory. While the Calusa exercised political hegemony over much of southern Florida during the historic period, the Belle Glade and Glades culture areas remained distinct from the Caloosahatchee culture area inhabited by the Calusa. It may be the case that the Caloosahatchee culture developed later than the Belle Glade culture.

== Excavation ==
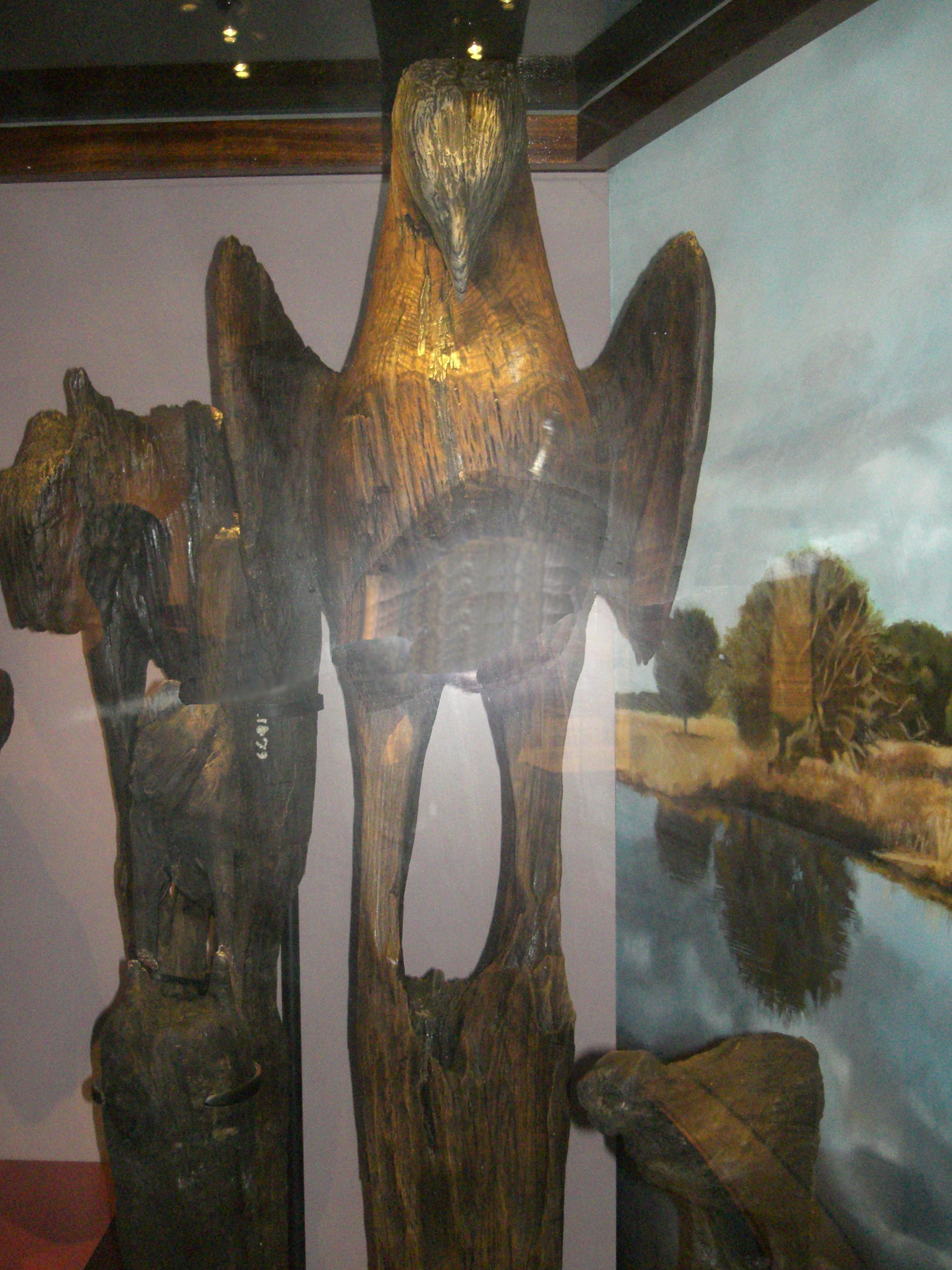
Wood carving of an eagle found at Fort Center in 1926, on display at the Florida Museum of Natural History

The Fort Center site came to the attention of archaeologists after a carved wooden bird was found in the pond in 1926. Working for the Federal Emergency Relief Administration beginning in the Great Depression, archaeologists conducted surveys and test excavations at Fort Center during the 1930s and 1940s. Archaeologist John Goggin surveyed the site in the early 1950s, digging some test pits. In 1961, an amateur group obtained permission from the land owner, Lykes Brothers, to survey the site. The group exceeded their permit and conducted an uncontrolled excavation. They took many artifacts, including objects from the historic period that had been reworked from metals of Spanish origin. When Lykes Brothers realized what was happening, they cancelled the group's permit, closed access to the site, and invited a professional archaeologist to survey the site.

The complex was excavated over six years (1966–1971) by teams from the University of Florida, Colgate University and Florida Atlantic University. The State of Florida acquired the Fort Center site from Lykes Brothers in 1999 as part of the Fisheating Creek Ecosystem. It is operated as the Fisheating Creek wildlife management area.

In 2010 further research at the Fort Center site was conducted by Victor D. Thompson and Thomas J. Pluckhahn with grants from the National Geographic Society, Ohio State University and the University of South Florida. their work confirmed much of Sears' data but differed significantly on the function and archaeological significance of the Fort Center ritual place. Thompson and Pluckhahn are the first archaeologists to view Fort Center as one of many persistent Monumental ritual earthworks in the Glades/Calusa cultural region of south Florida. They concluded that the area is one of the most important hunter-gatherer intensive earthworks groups in world prehistory.

== Origins ==
Sears believed that the freshwater regions of peninsular Florida were peopled by immigrants from northern South America who preceded Arawakan language-speakers through the Antilles. He cited the use of celts and adzes made from conch-shells, the proposed derivation of the Timucuan language from South American roots, the cultivation of maize, and the use of earthworks to form fields in savannahs (wet prairies) as was done in South America. He also cited the use of fiber-tempered pottery, similar to that used in South American, and distinct from pottery used in the rest of eastern North America. Many archaeologists have disagreed with Sears' conjecture that the Glades culture could not have built intensive earthworks without agriculture. Archaeologists who researched hunter-gather societies in the southeastern U.S. believed that Sears' interpretation, based solely on a single site reported by Denavan in the Amazon region of Columbia, and involving migration from that area, was a leap too far. The major disagreement then and now centered around a 365 m in diameter circular ditch at Fort Center referred to as the "Great Circle". Sears dismissed the existence of a center mound and the existence of seven other similar mounds in the region and concluded the intended use of the circle was for cultivating crops. Sears divided the period of occupation at Fort Center into four periods. Period I began before 450 BCE, perhaps as early as 1000 BCE, and lasted until around 200 CE. Period II ran from about 200 to between 600 and 800, followed by period III until 1200 to 1400, and then period IV up to about 1700.

Archaeologists have been skeptical of Sears' migration theory because there is no evidence of South American root crops being introduced to Florida, and the evidence from pottery does not give a clear south to north sequence of introduction within Florida. There is some support for the idea that maize, and at least one strain of tobacco, were introduced into Florida by a sea route. Other archaeologists have noted that the peoples living in the Greater Antilles prior to the arrival of Arawakan-speakers were hunter-gatherers, not agriculturists. They believe that the agricultural Arawakan-speaking Tainos did not reach Hispaniola and Cuba until 600 to 700, near the end of Sears' Period II, well after the introduction of maize at Fort Center. Thompson and Pluckhahn's research and dating clearly shows that Fort Center as a regional ritual center began with the construction of the Great Circle before Sears' Glade I period by as much as 350 years. Their recent archaeology also shows that immediately after the construction of the Great Circle, work commenced on the building of the mortuary mound and pond complex nearby. In 2017, anthropologist Nathan Lawres addressed the issue of previous researchers evaluating the monumental structures at Fort Center and the entire Kissimmee/Okeechobee Area primarily in terms of economic interpretations. He is the first to argue that the alterity of Belle Glade monumental landscapes provides a context to an ontological (metaphysical) approach.

== Period I ==
Period I is characterized by several mounds, mostly artificial, that supported living areas, and by circular ditches, which Sears interpreted as enclosing fields. Only one or a few families lived on the site at any given time, and there is no evidence of any differentiated status. Maize pollen was found in middens on the mounds and in the fields dating from this period.

Five artificial mounds, identified as Mounds 10, 11, 12, 13, and 14, are in or near the stream meander zone. They are each round, about 100 feet in diameter, and two to three feet high. Most of these mounds are now part of the natural levees along the Fisheating Creek. The mounds may have been built on existing natural levees, or the presence of the mounds may have helped shape the levees. Three burials were found in Mound 13, which may have been used as a burial mound and later as a house mound. Mound 10 was not excavated. Little other than sherds were found in the other mounds.

The Okeechobee basin is subject to frequent flooding. Mounds are required in most parts of the basin to raise house floors above flood levels. The only place in the area high enough to remain above the flood waters was a section of old natural levee. Part of this levee, named Midden B, was also used as a living site during Period I. While the mounds at Fort Center were mostly used as house platforms, some mounds and other earthworks served other purposes. The site may have been inhabited because it provided easy access to food sources in the stream.

Thompson and Pluckhahn conclude that the mortuary mound and pond complex was built much earlier. They agree that only a few families lived permanently on the site, but they found evidence of a larger number of people living there probably during times of construction. Such alterations to the physical landscape at Fort Center for continuous for almost twenty-five centuries. this would necessitate a volunteer labor force living periodically onsite. The regular group funerals would require lodging for the families of the deceased.

=== Circular ditches ===
Sears' team of archaeologists found three circular ditches at Fort Center. Two were about 300 feet in diameter, and partially overlapped. A third, later circular ditch was about 1,200 in diameter. It enclosed the earlier ditches, but was not concentric with either of them. This ditch was 25 to 30 feet wide, and six feet deep. Most of the dirt from the ditch had been thrown on the inner side of the ditch. There were two gaps in the ditch, one on the southeast side and another on the east side, closest to Mound B in the Ceremonial Complex.

No artifacts were found in the ditches or in the area enclosed by the ditches, but maize pollen was found under soil that had been disturbed from digging the ditches. Radio-carbon dating indicates that all three circles were complete by 450 BCE. There is no evidence of the circles being used for habitation, ceremonial or defense purposes. Sears holds that the maize pollen indicates that the circles were used for cultivation. The ditches around the circles penetrated the hardpan, helping to drain the prairie soil. Sears also states that the Great Circle likely was used for gardens from several centuries BCE until the end of period II, around 600 to 800. Sears compares the circular ditches at Fort Center to similar circular ditches used for agriculture in pre-Columbian Colombia.

Sears states that the circles at Fort Center were earlier than those of the Adena culture of the Ohio River valley. Sears believes that the Fort Center circles are related to circles at Hopewellian sites. He states that circle earthworks were almost certainly imported into Florida from South America along with maize. Sears believes that the inhabitants of Fort Center, who dug the circular ditches and introduced maize and cord-tempered pottery to the area, were people who were descended from migrants from South America, but they had been resident in Florida long enough to have adapted to the local environment.

In researching the circular ditches at Fort Center, Thompson and Pluckhahn employed LiDAR technology. They discovered that there were actually 4 concentric circular ditches, one more than Sears. Their measurement of the larger outer circle was 1197 feet in diameter. The greatest discovery by this team was the discovery that the circular ditches were routinely destroyed and rebuilt. This indicates that the Glades had a profound understanding of creation, destruction/death being an integral part of creation/birth. In contrast, Sears never researched similar circular ditches in the Lake Okeechobee Basin region that had the same features and like functions. Historian Ted Ehmann recently argued that beginning with the construction of the first feature at Fort Center, The Great Circle, and for the following twenty-five centuries, several groups worked cooperatively. Ehmann believes the evidence shows the merging of prehistoric cultures and a synthesis of beliefs occurred, and was unique to the south Florida mound-building epoch.

== Period II ==
During Period II, from about 200 until sometime between 400 and 600, all of the residents of Fort Center, three to six families, were involved in a ceremonial center. Two mounds, A and B, and an artificial pond are interpreted as a ceremonial complex. An embankment or wall surrounds Mound B and the pond, with both ends attached to Mound A. Part of the area enclosed by the embankment forms what appears to be a courtyard, but no evidence of how it may have been used was found. The complex was located on the prairie, close to the stream meander belt, and was the focus of the Fort Center site during Period II.

=== Mounds ===
Mound A is irregular in shape and about three feet tall. It has been interpreted as a living site. A couple of slightly higher places on the mound were probably structure sites. Middens on Mound A contained potsherds, maize pollen, animal bones (mostly deer), and human baby teeth. Some human bones, broken similarly to the animal bones, were also found in the middens, suggesting that cannibalism was practiced at the site. Shell tools, stone grinding tools and pipes were found in the living areas of the mound. Also found were sherds from imported ceramics, including types identified as Deptford, Cartersville, Pasco, Crystal River, and St. Johns. Sears suggests that this trade pottery was sacred and acquired for ceremonial purposes. Many post holes found in the lower level of the mound indicate that round or oval houses about 30 feet in diameter had stood on the mound. There were also pits in which shells had been burned to produce lime. Unburned shells around the edges of the lime pits were mainly river mussels, but also included conchs and venus clams. Human coprolites, feces preserved by exposure to the lime, were also found around the edges of the pits. Mound A was expanded at least twice during Periods II and III (200 to 1200 or later), with a particularly dense midden area deposited in the first half of that period. Some habitation of the mound extended past 1400.

At its final development, Mound B was cone-shaped (with a steeper slope on the upper part) with a slightly truncated top. Decayed conch shells, along with badly decayed human bones and teeth, were found on the original surface of the mound, below the lowest midden layer of Mound B. Dirt excavated from the adjacent pond was used to build the earliest part of Mound B and the embankment that surrounded the mound (connecting to Mound A at both ends). Around 500 Mound B was built up more with dirt from another borrow pit (not the pond). Around 150 secondary bundled burials were placed in the sides of mound in the dirt added at this time. No artifacts were found with the secondary burials, but small deposits of muck, presumed to be from the pond associated with Mounds A and B, were found with them. A set of objects, described by Sears as a "Hopewellian type deposit", was found in the side of Mound B facing the pond.

Mound B was originally used as a living site and for preparing and bundling bodies. The habitation area was later moved to Mound A while the body preparation activities continued on Mound B. Use of Mound A for ceremonial purposes is indicated by broken pipes found on Mound A and in the charnel pond. Pipes have been found at only one other place (the University of Florida Mound) at Fort Center. Habitation of Mound A apparently continued for a while after the site ceased being used as a ceremonial center.

=== Charnel pond ===
The artificial pond in the ceremonial complex was four to five feet deep, with a nearly flat bottom. It was cut through the hardpan, allowing water above the hardpan to flow into the pond, keeping it full. Dirt from Mound B had washed into the pond, partially filling it. Excavation of the pond yielded wooden objects, human bones from about 150 individuals, and human coprolites. Some of the wooden pieces found in the pond were carved (it was a carved wooden bird found in this pond that first brought the site to the attention of archaeologists). Some of the carvings had remnants of a lime-based coating. Other pieces of wood were long enough to have been set in the bottom of the pond and hold the carvings above the water. Some of the wood was rotted, other pieces were charred. Under the wood and bones was a midden layer, consisting of sherds, shells, pipe fragments and coprolites (preserved human feces). Some of the coprolites showed evidence of constipation, others showed evidence of diarrhea. Sears interpreted the materials in the midden layer as having been thrown into the pond during a "housecleaning" of Mound A, with the coprolites coming from the lime pits where similar coprolites were excavated.

Despite the large number of carved beast and bird effigies in the same naturalistic style of Calusa wood carving, he stated he did not see in carving style or function any real resemblance to similar figures found at the Key Marco Calusa sites. Without research to support, Sears stated such wood carvings were similar and comparable with other North American Indian art. William H. Marquardt an authority on Calusa wood carvings found only one other slightly comparable tradition, the Northwest Coast tribes. Sears also stated he believed the carved effigies had no community function despite their apparent connection to regional funeral and burial rituals.

Sears interprets the pond as a "charnel" pond, with a wooden platform in the pond holding bundled bodies. The carved figures of birds and animals found in the pond were probably mounted on the platform. (Note: The carvings may have represented ritually significant birds and animals. Alice Gates Schwehm thought that the Fort Center carvings showed a "soul in eye" concept. (More than 1,000 years later the Calusa believed that people had three souls, one of which resided in the pupil of the eye.) Hann places the wood carvings at Fort Center in an "effigy style" of wood carvings that have also been found at Key Marco and Belle Glade and described in Spanish reports about the Calusa. Hann states that this southern Florida style shows some resemblance to the Southeastern Ceremonial Complex, but is missing many of its elements, and that it more closely resembles the Hopewell tradition.) The platform stood long enough for some of the wood to rot. The platform apparently caught fire and collapsed into the pond sometime around 500. As the bones found in the pond accounted for about 150 bodies, and about 150 bundled bodies with muck from the pond were found buried in Mound B, Sears states that the platform in the charnel pond must have held about 300 bundled bodies when it burned and collapsed. About half of the bundled bodies dumped into the pond were recovered and reburied in Mound B. The sex and age distribution of the bones is normal for the level of culture attributed to the inhabitants of Fort Center. Sears states that the platform was "clearly ceremonial", that the pond was a "culturally correct environment for [a] charnel platform", and that the water was "a ceremonial requirement." Water burials were common in inland (freshwater) sites in Florida, such as the Windover archaeological site and Little Salt Spring. Artificial ponds have been noted at two other sites near Fisheating Creek. A "water mortuary cult" may have been widespread in southern Florida from Paleoindian times into the historic period.

Later analysis of the bones found in the charnel pond and in Mound B indicated the people suffered from osteoarthritis and anemia due to parasite infections and iron deficiency, but were relatively well nourished and showed less tooth wear than other contemporary populations in Florida. Few lived past age 35, and none in the analyzed population lived past about 55.

=== Significance ===
Sears interprets the complex consisting of Mounds A and B and the charnel pond as a ceremonial center where mortuary specialists processed bodies; in particular, they cleaned flesh from bones. (Note: Sears compares the Fort Center specialists to the Choctaw "Buzzard Men". These mortuary specialists, sometimes called "bone-pickers", cleaned bones and then returned them to the family of the deceased. They held high status in their society. The practice may have been widespread in the Southeastern United States.) They probably lived with their families on Mound B early in Period II, moving to Mound A later in the Period. They served a population spread through a large area, and probably also supplied tobacco, pipes, and lime for processing maize to the surrounding population. The 300 bodies kept on the platform may represent the people of the ceremonial center over several centuries. All of the residents of the ceremonial center would have been in a sacred social class, serving some large portion of the Okeechobee Basin (including the Kissimmee Valley). (There were many small sites with single houses on mounds throughout the area.)

== Period III ==
Period III ran from between 600 and 800 to between 1200 and 1400. The ceremonial center was no longer active. Two places on the natural levee along Fisheating Creek, Midden A and part of Midden B, were occupied during this period, as was Mound A for at least the early part of the period. There was little change in the artifacts left by Period III inhabitants compared to artifacts from Period II. There is no evidence of maize cultivation from Period III.

== Period IV ==
Period IV ran from sometime between 1200 and 1400 to around 1700. Most of this period was after European contact began affecting the peoples of Florida. Artifacts recovered from this period include reworked metal of Spanish origin. Occupation continued at Middens A and B on the natural levee along Fisheating Creek, and expanded to new mounds on the prairie away from the stream meander zone. Linear earthworks associated with those mounds also appeared in this period. Maize pollen was found in deposits from this period, after being absent during Period III. Burials from after 1500 were found in the top of Mound B. Most of these burials were flexed (legs bent), while the rest were bundled. Post holes associated with the upper level burials may be from small shelters built over the burials.

Burials from Period IV were associated with grave goods, including objects reworked from Spanish gold, silver, copper and brass, unlike those from earlier periods. Some of the grave goods may have been symbols or badges of rank. Fort Center was probably now part of the Calusa realm. Hernando de Escalante Fontaneda, who was held captive by Indians in Florida for 17 years in the 16th century, indicates that the Mayaimi people, who lived around Lake Okeechobee and were therefore the likely inhabitants of Fort Center, were subject to the Calusa. Fontenada describes the Mayaimi as living in very small towns and scattered settlements. Sears states that the Calusa probably did not use Fort Center as a ceremonial center.

During Period IV, several living sites were occupied (although not necessarily all at the same time), including Middens A and B, and Mounds 1, 2, 3, 5, 8, and the University of Florida Mound. Most of the mounds were new to this period. Mound 3 was built up from a small natural mound, and had been previously occupied. Mound 8 may be natural. Broken smoking pipes were found at the original ground level under the University of Florida mound, indicating the site may have served a ceremonial purpose before the mound was built. The mounds (not including the middens on the levee) are each big enough for a single house, and each mound is associated with a linear earthwork, which Sears interpreted as "agricultural plots." The linear earthworks varied in size, from 30 to 100 feet wide and 300 to 1,200 feet long. The earthworks were raised two to three feet above the prairie, and were surround by ditches from which the fill was taken. Although one end of each linear earthwork was close to a house mound, they were never connected to the mounds. No artifacts were found in the linear earthworks.

Earthworks similar to the mounds and linear ridges at Fort Center have been reported from Belle Glade, Tony's Mound, Big Mound City and the Boynton Mound complex, and these sites may all have been part of a "prehistoric farmstead culture."

== Diet ==
Other than maize, which was perhaps used only in a ceremonial role or as a high-status food, the inhabitants of Fort Center relied on gathering, hunting and fishing for food. They ate a variety of animal food, particularly turtles (nine different species) and fish. They also ate alligators, snakes, frogs, sirens, opossums, raccoons, muskrats, moles, squirrels, foxes, bobcats, deer, geese, turkeys, and turkey buzzards.

== Maize cultivation ==
Sears reported several lines of evidence for the cultivation of maize at Fort Center. Direct evidence for the presence of maize was the discovery of maize pollen in several environments at Fort Center. (Note: Specimens from Fort Center were examined for the presence of four types of cultivated food plant pollen: maize, manioc, squash, and sweet potato. Only maize pollen was found. However, pigweed, goosefoot, and elderberry pollen was more common in the coprolites than was maize pollen, which indicates that gathered wild plants formed part of the diet. Maize pollen from Period I was found in the fields surrounded by the circular ditches and in middens. From Period II maize pollen was found in the lime-based coating on a carved bird found in the charnel pond, and in some (three out of 121) of the human coprolites examined. Maize pollen was also found in some of the Period IV linear earthworks.)

Indirect evidence for cultivation of maize at Fort Center includes the fields enclosed by circular ditches created during Period I, and the linear earthworks of Period IV, which Sears compares to the circles and ridges used for agriculture on tropical savannahs in pre-Columbian South America. Sears points out that the lime produced by burning shells on Mound A during Period II could be used to process dried maize into masa, and that pestles found in middens could be used to produce mush. Fontaneda stated that the Mayaimi ate bread made from roots, and does not mention maize, but Sears wondered whether Fontaneda may have failed to recognize maize.

The claim that maize was cultivated at Fort Center by 450 BCE has been controversial. Some archaeologists have pointed out that neither maize kernels nor cobs have been found at Fort Center. Others have questioned the dating of the maize pollen. McGoun argues that while the maize pollen found in fields might be the result of later contamination, the pollen in the coating on the carved wooden bird and in the coprolites is harder to explain away. Later reanalysis of samples from Fort Center confirmed the presence of maize pollen long before maize is known to have appeared elsewhere in Florida. Evidence against the proposition that the circular ditches drained fields so that maize could be cultivated includes that one of the earlier ditches did not cut through the hardpan in at least some places. The soil at Fort Center has low fertility, high acidity, and high levels of aluminum, and thus is not suited for growing maize. Milanich also notes that the raised ridges and circles in South America that Sears cites as the models for the structures at Fort Center differ in important details from Fort Center. An analysis of dental wear indicates that the Period II residents of Fort Center did not depend on horticulture for their diet, and any use of maize did not contribute significantly to their diet.

== 19th century ==
During the Second Seminole War Fort Center, a palisade of cabbage-palm trunks, was constructed on the northeastern edge of the Great Circle, on the banks of Fisheating Creek. The fort was named after Lieutenant J.P. Center, who was killed in the Battle of Lake Okeechobee during the Second Seminole War. Fort Center was one of several strategic forts for supplies for the war effort around Lake Okeechobee.

In 1842, a reconnaissance party of 83 sailors and marines (along with a Seminole guide and his wife and child) led by United States Navy Lieutenant John Rodgers traveled in 16 dugout canoes from Key Biscayne through the Everglades, across Lake Okeechobee and up both the Kissimmee River to Lake Tohopekaliga, and Fisheating Creek to the head of the open stream, before returning to Key Biscayne. Fort Center had been abandoned by then, and the expedition had to repair the palisade when they occupied it for a few days. The expedition found evidence that Seminoles had been living in the area of Fisheating Creek, but did not encounter any in the course of the 60-day expedition.

Fort Center was reactivated during the Third Seminole War (1853–55) as a station on a military road from Fort Myers to Fort Jupiter, with part of the route using canoes to cross Lake Okeechobee. No trace remains of the blockhouse, which may have been eroded by the river.
