= José de Urrutia =

José de Urrutia may refer to:

- José de Urrutia (explorer) (c. 1678–1741), Basque Spanish explorer
- José de Urrutia y de las Casas (1739–1803), Spanish captain general and military engineer
