= Ortona Prehistoric Village =

Archaeological site in Florida

The Ortona Prehistoric Village is an archaeological site adjacent to the community of Ortona in northeastern Glades County, Florida, north of the Caloosahatchee River and west of Lake Okeechobee, consisting of mounds, canals and other features. Part of the site is currently in the Glades County-owned Ortona Indian Mound Park, but much remains in private hands. The site has been extensively modified by 20th-century activities, including the construction of a county road and a cemetery, sand mining operations, and improvements to pasture land.

== Environs ==
The Ortona mounds are located about 3 miles (4.8 km) north of the present-day Caloosahatchee River. Until late in the 19th century, the Caloosahatchee River was fed by a series of lakes starting from Lake Hicpochee, and including Lettuce Lake, Bonnet Lake and Flirt Lake. A waterfall and set of rapids at the lower end of Flirt Lake marked the beginning of the river. The rapids were close to 1 mile (1.6 km) long, with a drop in elevation of about 10 feet (3.0 m). Lake Hicpochee, about 9,000 acres (3,600 ha) in area, was only 3 miles (4.8 km) from Lake Okeechobee, but there was no connection between the two lakes before the late 19th century. Water flowed from Lake Hicpochee westward into Lettuce Lake and then Bonnet Lake. When the water was high the two lakes merged. From Bonnet Lake water flowed into Lake Flirt, which was about 1,000 acres (400 ha) in area and 5 miles (8.0 km) long. All of the lakes were surrounded by extensive wetlands.

In 1881 Hamilton Disston, as part of a scheme to drain large areas of wetlands in the interior of Florida, had a canal dredged from Lake Okeechobee to Lake Hicpochee and through the lakes and wetlands to the west. His company removed the rock ledge that formed the falls and rapids below Lake Flirt, and straightened the upper reaches of the Caloosahatchee River. Various state and federal projects have widened and deepened the river since then. The conversion of the Caloosahatchee River into a canal drained Lake Flirt and the wetlands descending from Lake Hicpochee.

== Site components ==
The site was extensively altered during the 20th century, and many of the features were destroyed or heavily damaged. Archaeologists have used early descriptions and maps of the site, as well as aerial photographs taken in the middle of the 20th century, to construct a partial picture of the site before it was altered.

=== Canals ===
The remains of two linear canals connect the Ortona site with the Caloosahatchee River. One canal runs about 3.2 kilometres (2.0 mi) southeast from the site to a natural waterway connecting to the river. The other canal runs southwest from the site about 3.7 kilometres (2.3 mi) to what was Lake Flirt on the old river bed (the Caloosahatchee River was canalized in the 20th century). While the routes of the canals can be traced on old maps and aerial photos, they have been significantly altered and obscured by human actions in the 20th century.

Early maps show an “Indian Trail” running from Fisheating Creek that crossed the wetlands east of Lake Flirt (and south of the Ortona site) at a ford. The Seminole Wars Fort Thompson was located at the rapids below (west of) Lake Flirt.

The two canals were fed by a slough called Turkey Creek, which flowed towards the mounds from the north. The western canal (8GL4A) connected a small, round pond near the mounds to an arm of Lake Flirt called Cypress Branch. The eastern canal (8GL4B) started near the mounds but does not appear to have been connected to the pond. Wheeler speculates that the two canals may have been connected by Turkey Slough. A 1950 map based on aerial photos shows a short branch of the eastern canal connecting to a mound or group of mounds. Much of the eastern canal may have been re-dredged as a drainage canal during the 20th century.

Measurements made in the 20th century indicate that the canals were about 1.2 metres (3.9 ft) deep and 3 metres (9.8 ft) wide. The canals had flat bottoms and sloped sides, with spoil along their sides. A surviving portion of the eastern canal that was about to be destroyed in a sand mining operation was examined in 1997 by archaeologists. Trenches were cut through the canal to determine its history. Examination of the soil profiles in the trenches revealed that the canal was originally 6.7 to 9.1 metres (22 to 30 ft) wide at the top and 4.6 to 6.1 metres (15 to 20 ft) wide at the bottom of the canal, and 1 to 1.2 metres (3.3 to 3.9 ft) deep. Radiocarbon dates from samples of organic material recovered from the trenches indicate that the canal may have been dug as much as 1,900 years ago. A sample from the lowest layer was 1,600 to 1,900 years old. Two other samples above the original bottom of the canal, presumably deposited on sediment that had accumulated in the canal, were 1,100 to 1,750 years old.

Both canals slope from the area of the mounds to the river, dropping just over 1 foot (0.30 m) in every 1,000 feet (300 m). The slope was enough to maintain a flow of water through the canals without causing excessive erosion. Wheeler states that the canals were primarily for canoe traffic, although, as a secondary effect, they may have helped drain the area around the mounds. “The canals demonstrate a complex knowledge of local topography and hydraulic features.”

The Ortona canals differ from other pre-historic canals in southwest Florida, as having had a flow induced by a drop in elevation. The Mud Lake, Snake Bight and Naples canals were at sea level, subject only to tidal flows. The Pine Island and Cape Coral canals were static canals, closed at both ends and at intermediate points. In addition, the Ortona Canals may have been used to bypass a marshy section of the Caloosahatchee watershed and bring canoe traffic between Lake Okeechobee and the lower Caloosahatchee to the Ortona site, while the other canals provided shortcuts that also avoided taking canoes into open, and possibly rough, water.

=== Major mounds ===
On the east side of the site is a large mound (8GL5). Estimates of the size of the mound have varied over the years. In 1918 the mound was described as being 160 feet (49 m) by 130 feet (40 m), and 30 feet (9.1 m) tall. In 1948 the dimensions were given as 200 feet (61 m) by 200 feet (61 m), and 16 feet (4.9 m) tall, with part of the mound removed for road fill. By the 1990s the entire center of the mound had been removed, leaving a rim around the outside of the mound. Pits (presumably dug by "pot hunters") were reported in the mound as early as 1918, but there is no report of any human remains or artifacts being found in the mound.

Mound A (8GL80) is on the east side of Turkey Creek. The mound is about 38 to 39 metres (125 to 128 ft) across and 2.5 metres (8.2 ft) tall. It is one of the best-preserved mounds at Ortona. The mound is a midden, with animal bones and human artifacts. The soil in the mound is noticeably darker than that of other mounds at the site.

To the west of Turkey Creek is Mound B. Mound B was largely destroyed when it was mined for fill. Historical accounts and aerial photos indicate that the mound was 152 metres (499 ft) long, 21 metres (69 ft) wide and 5 feet (1.5 m) high. It has been described as being shaped like a loaf of bread. Test excavations on the remnants of the mound indicate that it was made primarily of sand, with some midden material mixed in.

Mound C has also been largely destroyed by mining. It was originally about 30.3 metres (99 ft) in diameter and about 1 metre (3.3 ft) high. Shards were observed on the surface of the mound in 1974.

Mound D was another "breadloaf-shaped" mound that was largely destroyed in the later 20th century. It was originally about 152 metres (499 ft) long, with a width that varied between 20 and 25 metres (66 and 82 ft). Stereoptic aerial photos from 1949 suggest that the mound had conical elevations at each end of the mound, but both ends have been leveled. One remaining segment of the mound has been bulldozed, but is still about .5 metres (1.6 ft) high. Robert Carr was present when the northern end of the mound was destroyed, and observed that the upper 1 metre (3.3 ft) of the mound contained organically-stained sand and pottery shards. A 16 metres (52 ft) wide ramp on the west side of the mound shows in mid-20th century aerial photos. A "causeway" appears to have connected the north end of Mound D to Mound C, which is east of Mound D.

== Discovery and examination ==
The site first appears in the written record in 1839, when surveyors noted a large mound and two canals at the site. The canals were described in a Smithsonian Institution report in 1882, while the mounds were described in American Antiquarian in 1887. In the first half of the 20th century the site was visited and described by R. D. Wainwright, John Kunkel Small, Aleš Hrdlička, Henry B. Collins, John W. Griffin and John Mann Goggin. Goggin returned to the site in 1952 with some students to excavate part of the large mound.

Glades County created the Ortona Indian Mound Park in 1989.

== History ==
Many archaeologists believe that the village was first settled around 300 A.D., and that the village lasted till 1150 A.D. They also believe that the height of the occupation was from 550–800 A.D. Ortona was built at a critical intersection of a north-south and an east-west trade routes.

The longest canals built by Indians in North America, built by the Calusa, connected the major waterway, the Caloosahatchee River at Ortona, because the site was just below the falls. Former state archaeologist Ryan J. Wheeler, made researches on the Ortona Canals using government maps and areal photography. Wheeler believes the canals traveled 20 miles, an incredible feat of hydraulic engineering by a group of hunter-gathers. Wheeler was instrumental in having the Mud Lake Canal, a 3.9 mile long Calusa canal in the Everglades, designated a National Historic Landmark.

The restoration and further study of the Ortona Canals is being undertaken by Robert S. Carr and his organization, the Florida Archaeological Conservancy. Architect and anthropologist, Richard Thornton, has researched, as well as, created village layouts, showing the various mounds and features. His ideas and layouts are online at his site, access genealogy. Thornton was the first to raise the point concerning the lack of barricades and fortification of the village. Southeast archaeologist George R. Milner conducted research on trends by prehistoric tribes of violence and warfare. Ortona as well as Fort Center were built at a brief window of peace and trade that started around 100 B.C. and lasted till 400 A.D.. Florida archaeologists such as Milanich, believe that features at Ortona were the result of contact by societies associated with the Mississippian culture due to similarities in building types.

The recent dating of the neighboring Fort Center site to 800–500 B.C. indicates that most likely, the culture that built Ortona, Fort Center, Big Mound City, and Tony's Mound had a unifying religion, trade and engineering skills and feats many centuries before the Hopewell and Mississippi culture.

== See also ==
- List of Mississippian sites
