= Calusa–Tunica languages =

Proposed language family

Calusa–Tunica
- Tunica–Calusa
- (proposed)
- Geographic distribution: Southeastern United States
- Linguistic classification: Gulf ?: Calusa–Tunica
- Subdivisions: Calusa †; Tunica †

Language codes
- Glottolog: None

The Calusa–Tunica languages are a proposed small language family that comprises the Tunica language of Louisiana and the extinct Calusa language of Florida.

== Proposal ==
Julian Granberry (1994) suggests that the Calusa language was related to the Tunica language of the lower Mississippi River Valley, with Calusa possibly being relatively a recent arrival from the lower Mississippi region. Another possibility was that similarities between the languages were derived from long-term mutual contact.

== Comparison of morphemes ==
Granberry (1994: 510–512) compares the following Tunica and Calusa morphemes. The Tunica data is from Mary Haas, while the Proto-Tunica reconstructions are Granberry's own work. The Calusa data is primarily drawn from Hernando de Escalante Fontaneda's 16th-century writings.

gloss	Proto-Tunica	Tunica	Calusa B	Calusa A
fem. sg. noun	*-hki ~ *-hči	-hči	-(h)ki	*-hki
imperative verb	*-k...	-ki	-ka	
over there, yonder	*-mi	mí-, -mí	-mi	
very much	*-štʔɛ	-štʔɛ	*st(ʔ)a	
this (noun designator)	*ka-	ká-	ka-	
all around, about	*te-	té-	te-	
watch (over, for), guard, wait	*hɛ́ra	hɛ́ra	śer(a)	
fast, prayer (noun) (húma = berry)	*huma	húma-ra	homa	
destroy, crush, mash	*kuč...	kúča	kuči	
assemble, gather together	*kunpa ([kuNpa] > kuhpa ?)	kúhpa	kupe ~ kunpe	*kuhpe ~ *kuNpe
settle, camp dwell, sit (down), stay, remain	*ʔuki	ʔúk(i)	(ʔ)uk(i)	
run	*lɔta	lɔ́ta	lɛte	
tongue(d), language	*lu	-lu	-lo ~ -lu	
make, build	*mašu	mášu	maś(u)	
on the other side	*may...	máyi	mayai	
come to rest, stop, lie down	*ña	ná	ño	
war, warrior	*ñaka	náka	ñoka	
look, find, see, watch	*po ~ *pe; *wo ~ *we	pó	we	
firm, hard, strong	*ra	rá	r(a)	
house, home, dwelling, building	*ri	r(í)	r(i)	
tree, branch, wood	*šahka	-šáhka	*śa(h)ka	*śahka
examine, look at	*sɛha	sɛ́ha	śe(h)(a)	
brave, bold	*ši	-š(í)	-ś(i)	
stick, impale, harpoon	*šihpu	šíhpu	śi(h)pi	*śihpi
prairie	*tahta	táhta	ta(h)te	*tahte
join, connect	*tepi	-tépi	-tepe	
cry, weep	*waha	wáha	wa(h)(a)	
water, liquid	*wiši ~ *ʔ...ši	wíš(i)	(ʔ)eś(i)	
bring, arrive	*yaka	yáka	yaka	
