= LaBelle Municipal Airport =

Airport in Florida, U.S.

Coordinates: 26°44′26.1000″N 081°25′41.8″W

- IATA: none; ICAO: none; FAA LID: X14

Summary
- Airport type: Public use
- Owner: Hendry County
- Operator: Tommy Vaughan
- Serves: LaBelle, Florida
- Location: Hendry County, Florida
- Elevation AMSL: 20 ft / 6 m
- Interactive map of LaBelle Municipal Airport

Runways
Direction	Length		Surface
Direction	ft	m	Surface
14/32	5,254	1,601	Asphalt

Statistics (2018)
- Aircraft operations (year ending 10/9/2018): 22,000
- Based aircraft: 66
- Source: Federal Aviation Administration

LaBelle Municipal Airport (FAA LID: X14) is a public-use airport located 1 mile (1.6 km) south of the central business district of the city of LaBelle in Hendry County, Florida, United States. The airport is publicly owned.

== See also ==
- List of airports in Florida
