= Nara Milanich =

American historian

Dr. Nara Milanich
- Education: Doctorate in History from Yale
- Alma mater: Brown University
- Occupation: Historian
- Notable work: Paternity: The Elusive Quest for the Father
- Website: naramilanich.org

Nara B. Milanich is Professor of History at Barnard College, Columbia University, specializing in Latin America; and the comparative histories of family, childhood, gender, reproduction, and social inequality.

Her most recent book is Paternity: The Elusive Quest for the Father (2019), published by Harvard University Press. She was interviewed about the book for Science Friday by Ira Flatow.

== Early life and education ==
Milanich is the daughter of archeologist Jerald T. Milanich and anthropologist Maxine Margolis, who have been professors at the University of Florida, Gainesville, Florida. She earned her BA degree at Brown University and her master's and doctorate degrees at Yale University.

== Career ==
Milanich joined the Barnard faculty in 2004. In addition to paternity and the family, her scholarly interests include modern Latin America, Chile, law, and social inequality. Her awards include the Columbia University, Heyman Center Society of Fellows, 2015–16; ACLS Burkhardt Fellowship, 2014–15; and the Grace Abbott Book Award from the Society for the History of Children and Youth (2009) for Children of Fate.

Milanich has received the Frederick Burkhardt Residential Fellowship for Recently Tenured Scholars from the American Council of Learned Societies, and the Fellowships for College Teachers and Independent Scholars from the National Endowment for the Humanities, which cited her Families, Class, and the State in Chile, 1800–1930.

She has published in scholarly journals and popular publications including Scientific American; Salon; and Time Magazine.

=== Paternity: The Elusive Quest for the Father ===
Milanich's book Paternity: The Elusive Quest for the Father was described as "a solidly researched and enlightening new book" in The New Yorker. The book was also reviewed in The Economist, Salon interviewed Milanich in an article about the book. Milanich and her book were the subjects of an article in The Atlantic. Paternity was also noted in the New York Times Review of Books.

== Bibliography ==
=== Books ===
- Milanich, Nara (2019). Paternity: The Elusive Quest for the Father. Harvard University. ISBN 978-0674980686.
- Milanich, Nara (2013). The Chile Reader: History, Culture, Politics (co-edited with Elizabeth Quay Hutchison, Thomas Miller Klubock, and Peter Winn). Duke University Press. ISBN 978-0-8223-5346-1.
- Milanich, Nara (2013). Children of Fate: Childhood, Class, and the State in Chile, 1850–1930. Duke University Press. ISBN 978-0-8223-4557-2.

=== Articles ===
- "The Electronic Paternity Test and Other Follies", Scientific American blog
- "Daddy Issues: "Responsible Paternity" as Public Policy in Latin America", World Policy Journal (2017) 34 (3): 8–14.
- "Certain Mothers, Uncertain Fathers: Assisted Reproductive Technologies in Historical Perspective" (2017), from Reassembling Motherhood, Procreation and Care in a Globalized World, Edited by Yasmine Ergas, Jane Jenson, and Sonya Michel, Columbia University Press
