= Calusa language =

Extinct language of Florida, United States

Calusa
- Native to: United States
- Region: Florida
- Ethnicity: Calusa
- Extinct: ca. 1800
- Language family: unclassified (Calusa–Tunica?)

Language codes
- ISO 639-3: None (mis)
- Glottolog: calu1239
- Map of Calusa territory

The Calusa language is an unclassified language of southern Florida, United States that was spoken by the Calusa people.

== Classification ==
Circumstantial evidence, primarily from Hernando de Escalante Fontaneda, suggests that all of the peoples of southern Florida and the Tampa Bay area, including the Tequesta, Mayaimi, and Tocobaga, as well as the Calusa, spoke dialects of a common language. It was probably related to Mayaca (Macoya and Mayajueca) which is closely related to Ais and Ais (Surruque (probably not) and Jaega as the same language).

=== Comparison with Tunica ===
Julian Granberry (1994) has suggested that the Calusa language was related to the Tunica language of the lower Mississippi River Valley, with Calusa possibly being relatively a recent arrival from the lower Mississippi region. Another possibility was that similarities between the languages were derived from long-term mutual contact.

== Phonology ==
Granberry (2011) provides the following inventory of Calusa phonemes.

Consonants
	Labial	Apical	Palatal	Velar	Velar
Plosive	p	t	tʃ	k	ʔ
Fricative		s			h
Rhotic		r			
Nasal	m	n	ɲ		
Lateral		l			
Approximant	w		j		

A Calusa /s/ [s̠] sound is said to range between a [s] to a [ʃ] sound.

Vowels
	Front	Central	Back
Close	i		u
Close-mid	e		o
Open-mid	ɛ		ɔ
Open		a	

== Vocabulary ==
Little is known of the language of the Calusa. A dozen words for which translations were recorded and 50 or 60 place names form the entire known corpus of the language.

A few vocabulary examples from Granberry (2011) are listed below:

- tepe 'join'
- kuči 'destroy'
- ñoka 'war'
- ño 'village'
- *śahka 'tree'
- mayai 'on the other side'

(*) denotes earlier century Calusa language records.

Some Calusa words, proper nouns, and phrases from Hernando de Escalante Fontaneda's writings (including his 1575 memoir Memoria de las cosas y costa y indios de la Florida) that are cited in Zamponi (2024) include:

Calusa	English gloss (Zamponi 2024)	Spanish gloss (original)	notes
carlos	ferocious people	quiere desir en su lenguaje pueblo feros	Spanish corruption of caalus
Certepe	chief king and great lord	Rey mayor y gran señor	
ño	beloved town	quiere dezir pueblo querido	
seletega	Run, see if people are coming!	Corre mira si biene jente	
tejiEue	lookout, vantage point	miradero quiere dezir	
cañogacola	wicked people without respect	gente bellaca sin Respeto	from regions above Tampa on the Gulf Coast
cuchiaga	place where there has been torture	quiere dezir lugar Amartirisado	from the Keys
guarugunbe	town of weeping	quiere desir en rromanse pueblo de llanto	from the Keys
guasaca Esgui	river of reeds	quiere desir Rio de cañas	from regions above Tampa on the Gulf Coast
mayaimi	(very) large	llamase laguna de mayaimi porqués muy grande	from the Lake Okeechobee region
tocobaga chile	principal chief of the Tocobaga	el Rei casique mayor (...) llamase tocobaga chile	from the area around Tampa Bay

Sipi is the name of a main idol in a Calusa temple, according to a 1743 report (Informe) by Fr. Joseph Xavier de Alaña that was sent to his superiors.

== See also ==
- Indigenous people of the Everglades region
