= 1956 United States presidential election in Florida =

- November 6, 1956

Nominee	Dwight D. Eisenhower	Adlai Stevenson
Party	Republican	Democratic
Home state	Pennsylvania (Note: Although he was born in Texas and grew up in Kansas before his military career, at the time of the 1952 election Eisenhower was president of Columbia University and was, officially, a resident of New York. During his first term as president, he moved his private residence to Gettysburg, Pennsylvania, and officially changed his residency to Pennsylvania.)	Illinois
Running mate	Richard Nixon	Estes Kefauver
Electoral vote	10	0
Popular vote	643,849	480,371
Percentage	57.27%	42.73%

Eisenhower
50–60%
60–70%
70–80%
Stevenson
50–60%
60–70%
70–80%
80–90%
President before election
Dwight D. Eisenhower
Republican
Elected President
Dwight D. Eisenhower
Republican

The 1956 United States presidential election in Florida was held on November 6, 1956, as part of the concurrent United States presidential election. Florida voters chose ten electors, or representatives to the Electoral College, who voted for president and vice president.

Except for the 1928 election when fierce anti-Catholicism and Prohibitionism caused Herbert Hoover to defeat the wet Catholic Al Smith, Florida since the end of Reconstruction had been a classic Southern one-party state dominated by the Democratic Party. Disfranchisement of African-Americans and many poor whites had virtually eliminated the Republican Party – only nine Republicans were ever elected to the state legislature between 1890 and 1950 – while Democratic primaries were the sole competitive elections.

Under the influence of Senator Claude Pepper, Florida abolished the poll tax in 1937, leading to steady increases in voter turnout during the following several elections; however, there was no marked increase in African-American voting and Democratic hegemony remained unchallenged: FDR did not lose a single county in the state during his four elections.

However, the following two elections would see a rapid trend away from Democratic hegemony towards Republican dominance in newer, more liberal South Florida. The regions shifting rapidly towards the GOP in these two elections lacked a history of slave-based plantation farming, and saw Eisenhower as more favourable to business than the Democratic Party. They also had seen a very large inflow of elderly migrants from the Northern states who were attracted by Florida's hot climate. An example of this is Collier County in southwest Florida, home to the city of Naples, which went Republican for the first time since the county's founding in 1923 and has never voted Democratic since. Consequently, Eisenhower was able to carry Florida by a double-digit margin in 1952, in spite of losing badly in the "Hoovercrat" pineywoods and Black Belt of the Panhandle.

The 1956 election saw, in general, little change from trends established during the previous two elections, with the most significant exception being a marked (though temporary) trend towards Eisenhower amongst the small but increasing number of Black voters in the state. Eisenhower, aided further by increased Northerner migration, won against his rematch opponent Adlai Stevenson II by 163,474 votes or 14.54%. This was the first time since 1872 that a Republican carried Florida twice. This result nonetheless made Florida about 0.86% more Democratic than the nation at large.

== Results ==
Electoral results
Presidential candidate	Party	Home state	Popular vote		Electoral vote	Running mate		
Presidential candidate	Party	Home state	Count	Percentage	Electoral vote	Vice-presidential candidate	Home state	Electoral vote
Dwight D. Eisenhower (incumbent)	Republican	Pennsylvania	643,849	57.19%	10	Richard Nixon (incumbent)	California	10
Adlai Stevenson II	Democratic	Illinois	480,371	42.67%	0	Estes Kefauver	Tennessee	0
Various candidates	Write-ins (Note: These write-in votes are listed in America at the Polls, but not in Dave Leip's Atlas.)	—	1,542	0.14%	0	—	—	0
Total			1,125,762	100%	10			10
Needed to win					270			270

=== Results by county ===
County	Dwight D. Eisenhower Republican		Adlai Stevenson Democratic		Margin		Total votes cast
County	#	%	#	%	#	%	Total votes cast
Alachua	7,939	53.54%	6,889	46.46%	1,050	7.08%	14,828
Baker	366	20.23%	1,443	79.77%	-1,077	-59.54%	1,809
Bay	4,971	36.51%	8,645	63.49%	-3,674	-26.98%	13,616
Bradford	1,203	34.07%	2,328	65.93%	-1,125	-31.86%	3,531
Brevard	10,004	71.81%	3,928	28.19%	6,076	43.62%	13,932
Broward	43,552	72.45%	16,561	27.55%	26,991	44.90%	60,113
Calhoun	554	24.57%	1,701	75.43%	-1,147	-50.86%	2,255
Charlotte	1,589	63.11%	929	36.89%	660	26.22%	2,518
Citrus	1,570	50.69%	1,527	49.31%	43	1.38%	3,097
Clay	2,372	53.67%	2,048	46.33%	324	7.34%	4,420
Collier	1,934	59.73%	1,304	40.27%	630	19.46%	3,238
Columbia	1,841	36.19%	3,246	63.81%	-1,405	-27.62%	5,087
DeSoto	1,234	48.41%	1,315	51.59%	-81	-3.18%	2,549
Dixie	370	29.04%	904	70.96%	-534	-41.92%	1,274
Duval	53,481	50.17%	53,127	49.83%	354	0.34%	106,608
Escambia	13,227	37.21%	22,320	62.79%	-9,093	-25.58%	35,547
Flagler	498	41.92%	690	58.08%	-192	-16.16%	1,188
Franklin	571	37.34%	958	62.66%	-387	-25.32%	1,529
Gadsden	1,321	36.87%	2,262	63.13%	-941	-26.26%	3,583
Gilchrist	137	12.90%	925	87.10%	-788	-74.20%	1,062
Glades	309	47.69%	339	52.31%	-30	-4.62%	648
Gulf	570	24.12%	1,793	75.88%	-1,223	-51.76%	2,363
Hamilton	464	23.71%	1,493	76.29%	-1,029	-52.58%	1,957
Hardee	1,589	45.67%	1,890	54.33%	-301	-8.66%	3,479
Hendry	1,071	51.64%	1,003	48.36%	68	3.28%	2,074
Hernando	1,295	47.44%	1,435	52.56%	-140	-5.12%	2,730
Highlands	3,480	60.25%	2,296	39.75%	1,184	20.50%	5,776
Hillsborough	41,889	52.04%	38,610	47.96%	3,279	4.08%	80,499
Holmes	1,036	29.17%	2,516	70.83%	-1,480	-41.66%	3,552
Indian River	4,059	70.49%	1,699	29.51%	2,360	40.98%	5,758
Jackson	2,543	29.86%	5,973	70.14%	-3,430	-40.28%	8,516
Jefferson	540	31.02%	1,201	68.98%	-661	-37.96%	1,741
Lafayette	187	15.07%	1,054	84.93%	-867	-69.86%	1,241
Lake	10,888	71.57%	4,326	28.43%	6,562	43.14%	15,214
Lee	7,565	62.60%	4,520	37.40%	3,045	25.20%	12,085
Leon	6,828	49.30%	7,022	50.70%	-194	-1.40%	13,850
Levy	934	33.90%	1,821	66.10%	-887	-32.20%	2,755
Liberty	238	21.48%	870	78.52%	-632	-57.04%	1,108
Madison	1,017	33.01%	2,064	66.99%	-1,047	-33.98%	3,081
Manatee	11,904	68.82%	5,394	31.18%	6,510	37.64%	17,298
Marion	6,362	50.99%	6,114	49.01%	248	1.98%	12,476
Martin	2,997	68.36%	1,387	31.64%	1,610	36.72%	4,384
Miami-Dade	130,938	55.37%	105,559	44.63%	25,379	10.74%	236,497
Monroe	3,337	43.54%	4,327	56.46%	-990	-12.92%	7,664
Nassau	1,717	38.31%	2,765	61.69%	-1,048	-23.38%	4,482
Okaloosa	2,788	32.66%	5,748	67.34%	-2,960	-34.68%	8,536
Okeechobee	575	40.78%	835	59.22%	-260	-18.44%	1,410
Orange	37,482	72.06%	14,532	27.94%	22,950	44.12%	52,014
Osceola	3,602	65.19%	1,923	34.81%	1,679	30.38%	5,525
Palm Beach	35,746	71.40%	14,321	28.60%	21,425	42.80%	50,067
Pasco	5,501	56.82%	4,181	43.18%	1,320	13.64%	9,682
Pinellas	74,314	72.55%	28,113	27.45%	46,201	45.10%	102,427
Polk	23,682	55.98%	18,626	44.02%	5,056	11.96%	42,308
Putnam	4,212	56.58%	3,232	43.42%	980	13.16%	7,444
St. Johns	5,104	56.44%	3,940	43.56%	1,164	12.88%	9,044
St. Lucie	5,435	66.56%	2,731	33.44%	2,704	33.12%	8,166
Santa Rosa	1,909	31.54%	4,144	68.46%	-2,235	-36.92%	6,053
Sarasota	13,937	73.40%	5,052	26.60%	8,885	46.80%	18,989
Seminole	5,841	65.15%	3,125	34.85%	2,716	30.30%	8,966
Sumter	1,061	31.30%	2,329	68.70%	-1,268	-37.40%	3,390
Suwannee	1,046	24.85%	3,163	75.15%	-2,117	-50.30%	4,209
Taylor	776	28.52%	1,945	71.48%	-1,169	-42.96%	2,721
Union	218	18.54%	958	81.46%	-740	-62.92%	1,176
Volusia	25,103	63.40%	14,489	36.60%	10,614	26.80%	39,592
Wakulla	393	26.79%	1,074	73.21%	-681	-46.42%	1,467
Walton	1,606	33.24%	3,225	66.76%	-1,619	-33.52%	4,831
Washington	1,027	32.18%	2,164	67.82%	-1,137	-35.64%	3,191
Totals	643,849	57.27%	480,371	42.73%	163,478	14.54%	1,124,220

==== Counties that flipped from Democratic to Republican ====
- Clay
- Duval
- Citrus
- Collier
- Hendry

==== Counties that flipped from Republican to Democratic ====
- Flagler
- Hernando

=== Results by congressional district ===
Eisenhower won 6 out of 8 of Florida's congressional districts, including 4 held by Democrats.

District	Eisenhower	Stevenson
1st	63%	37%
2nd	50.3%	49.7%
3rd	35.9%	64.1%
4th	55%	45%
5th	65.4%	34.6%
6th	69.7%	30.3%
7th	61.8%	38.2%
8th	39.6%	60.4%
