= Big Mound City =

- U.S. National Register of Historic Places
- Location within Florida Location within the United States
- Location: Canal Point, Florida
- Coordinates: 26°52′29″N 80°28′39″W
- NRHP reference No.: 73000596
- Added to NRHP: May 24, 1973

Big Mound City (8PB48) is a prehistoric site near Canal Point, Florida, United States. It is located 10 miles east of Canal Point, off U.S. Route 98. On May 24, 1973, it was added to the U.S. National Register of Historic Places. It is located inside the J.W. Corbett Wildlife Management Area.

== History ==
Big Mound City is the site of one of four recognized monumental Native American earthworks built in the Lake Okeechobee Basin area of southeastern Florida. Dating from the Glades period III (circa 1000 AD), it is a combination of at least nine mound structures and a ridge complex, including radiating causeways and crescent-shaped man-made ponds. Some of the mounds have been identified as burial mounds. Except for a brief study by M.W. Stirling, who studied the complex in the 1930s while excavating the burial mound and midden at the Belle Glade site, Big Mound City has never been excavated. It was not until 2017 that the first dating of the complex was completed and published. Despite there being no data, such as ceramics, recovered from the site, the site has appeared repeatedly in compilations referencing the archaeology of south Florida. Researchers of mound-building cultures in Florida such as Jerald Milanich believe that the same Indians who built Big Mound City also built Tony's Mound, Fort Center and the Ortona Prehistoric Village, all in the Lake Okeechobee Basin area.

== See also ==
- List of burial mounds in the United States
- List of Mississippian sites
