= Hendry County, Florida =

County in Florida, United States

- County
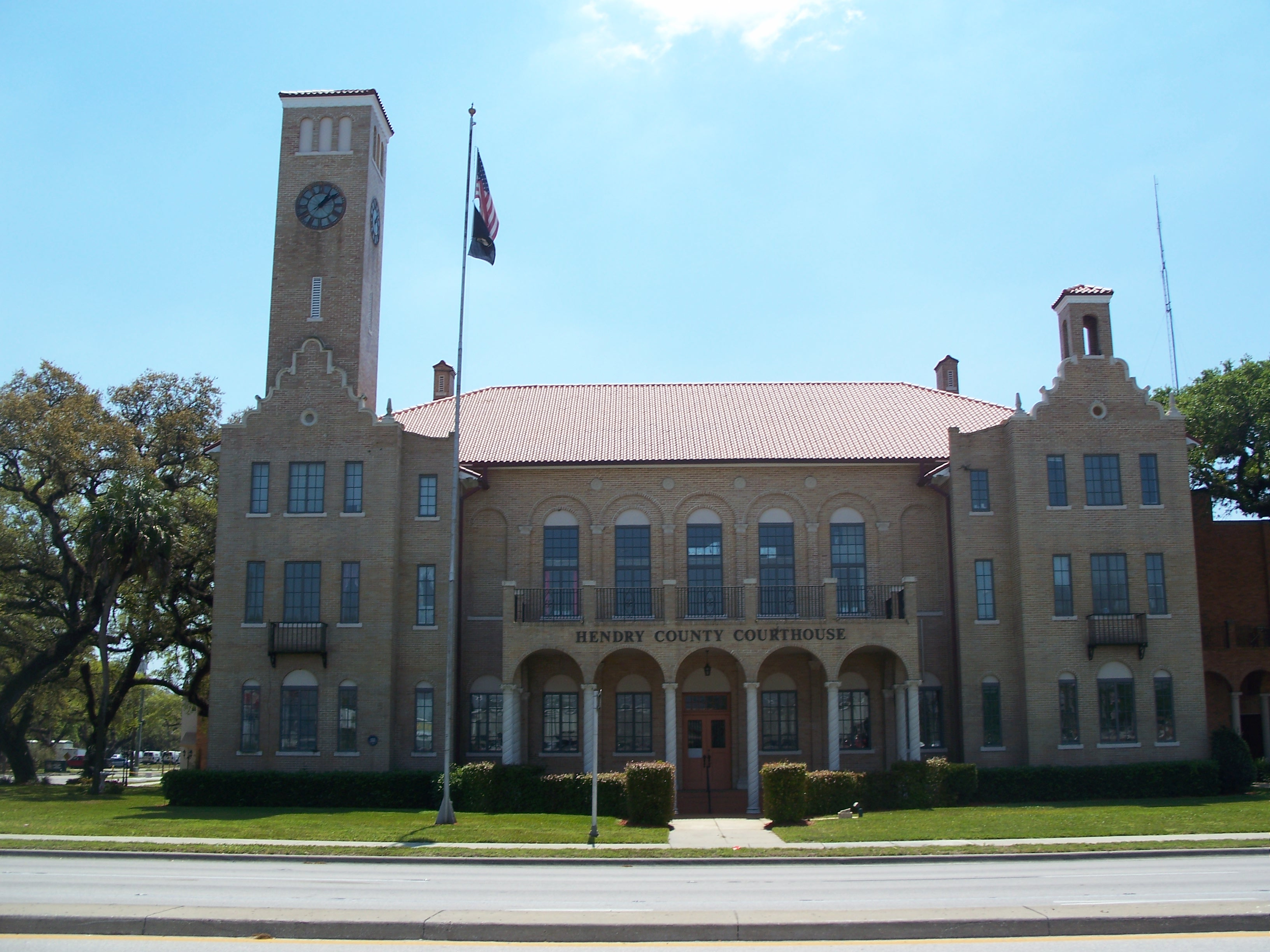
- The Hendry County Courthouse in LaBelle in 2010.

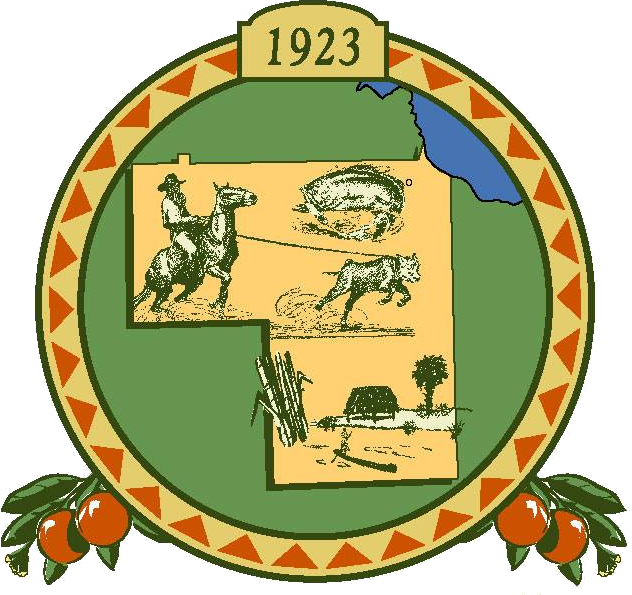
- Seal

- Location within the U.S. state of Florida
- Coordinates: 26°33′N 81°10′W
- Country: United States
- State: Florida
- Founded: May 11, 1923
- Named for: Francis A. Hendry
- Seat: LaBelle
- Largest city: Clewiston

Area
  - Total: 1,190 sq mi (3,100 km^{2})
  - Land: 1,153 sq mi (2,990 km^{2})
  - Water: 37 sq mi (96 km^{2}) 3.1%

Population (2020)
  - Total: 39,619
  - Estimate (2025): 48,276 ▲
  - Density: 34.36/sq mi (13.27/km^{2})
- Time zone: UTC−5 (Eastern)
  - Summer (DST): UTC−4 (EDT)
- Congressional district: 18th
- Website: www.hendryfla.net

Hendry County is a county in the Florida Heartland region of the U.S. state of Florida. As of the 2020 census, the population was 39,619, a 1.2% increase from 39,140 at the 2010 census. The county is majority-Hispanic or Latino. Its county seat is LaBelle. Hendry County is in the Clewiston micropolitan area, a Micropolitan statistical area (μSA) which also includes Glades County. These two counties, along with the Cape Coral-Fort Myers (Lee County) MSA and the Naples-Marco Island (Collier County) MSA, constitute the Cape Coral-Fort Myers-Naples Combined Statistical Area (CSA).

== History ==
Indigenous peoples migrated into Florida around 10000 B.C.E., while the Glades culture existed in southern Florida from approximately 500 B.C.E. to 1500 C.E. Archaeological sites attesting to the presence of the Glades culture in modern-day Hendry County include Clewiston Mounds, Maple Mound, South Lake Mounds, and Tony's Mound. When Europeans arrived in Florida in the 16th century, the Calusa and Mayaimi tribes resided in Southwest Florida and around Lake Okeechobee.

In the early 1800s, French trader Pierre Denaud established a trading post in the modern-day LaBelle area. During the Seminole Wars, United States troops built a fort along the Caloosahatchee River in 1838, named Fort Denaud in his honor. About three years later, Fort Thompson was established. These military posts became the first permanent settlements in modern-day Hendry County. Originally, the area now comprising Hendry County remained relatively inaccessible, as the Florida Everglades covered more than half of the county's present-day boundaries. Further, nearly the entire area became submerged with water seasonally; thus, only cattle-grazing was a suitable industry. However, by 1881, the Atlantic and Gulf Coast and Okeechobee Land Company began draining the land after entering into a contract with the trustees of the internal improvement fund. The county's first post office was established at Fort Thomson in 1884. The state of Florida established Lee County in 1887, which included land now part of Hendry County. Settlement in LaBelle began around 1889 or 1890, after the town was platted by Francis A. Hendry, a cattle rancher, politician, and officer in the Confederate States Army during the American Civil War.

Around the beginning of the 20th century, commercial fishermen began building fishing camps along Lake Okeechobee at Sand Point, later renamed Clewiston, though the city was not permanently settled until about 1920. In 1911, LaBelle became the oldest municipality in modern-day Hendry County after officially incorporating. That same year, the United States government established the Big Cypress Indian Reservation in present-day Hendry County via executive order by President William Howard Taft. By the early 1920s, residents in the eastern Lee County communities of Clewiston, Felda, Fort Denaud, and LaBelle began campaigning for the creation of a new county. Among their reasons for supporting the establishment of a new county was dissatisfaction with the distance between eastern Lee County settlements and the county seat, Fort Myers. Around that time, the Caloosahatchee Current was established to prove that the area could sustain a newspaper publication.

On May 11, 1923, just three days after neighboring Collier County was also created and partitioned from Lee County, the Florida Legislature voted to establish Hendry County, named after Francis A. Hendry. The first county commissioners were M.F. Boisclaire, M.E. Forrey, Thomas O'Brien, R.H. Magill, and L.N. Thomas. The town of LaBelle (chartered as a city in 1925) was designated as the county seat. A temporary jail was erected at a city park in LaBelle, while E.E. Goodno, who owned the Everett Hotel, allowed rooms and office space in the building to be used as a temporary courthouse.

Residents voted by a wide margin in favor of a $530,000 bond issue in November 1924, with $430,000 to be allotted towards improvement of roads and $100,000 for construction of a courthouse. The courthouse was finished in 1927, and has been listed in the National Register of Historic Places since 1990. In 1925, the only other incorporated municipality in Hendry County, Clewiston, became a city. In mid-1926, a cross-state highway (initially designated as State Road 25, but later renumbered 80) linking Fort Myers to Palm Beach was completed and passed through Hendry County. Around this time, the Gulf Atlantic Transportation, based in LaBelle, began providing transportation from Fort Myers to West Palm Beach. Another improvement to transportation occurred when the Seaboard–All Florida Railway started its rail service from LaBelle to Fort Myers in mid-1927. The 1926 Miami hurricane and 1928 Okeechobee hurricane both impacted Hendry County, though damage and loss of life was significantly less than in other areas around Lake Okeechobee.

The Number 5 British Flying Training School was operated at Riddle Field in Clewiston during World War II, with more than 1,800 Royal Air Force pilots trained there. Upon completion of the Herbert Hoover Dike in 1961, a dedication ceremony was held in Clewiston, which included a speech by former president Herbert Hoover.

== Geography ==
According to the U.S. Census Bureau, the county has a total area of 1,190 square miles (3,100 km^{2}), of which 1,153 square miles (2,990 km^{2}) is land and 37 square miles (96 km^{2}) (3.1%) is water. The county borders Lake Okeechobee; the Lake Okeechobee Scenic Trail runs through Hendry County. Hendry County is the southernmost county in the United States which does not have an ocean coastline or an international border.

=== Adjacent counties ===
- Glades County - north
- Martin County - northeast
- Okeechobee County -
  northeast via 5 county intersection in the middle of Lake Okeechobee
- Palm Beach County - east
- Broward County - southeast
- Collier County - south
- Lee County - west
- Charlotte County - west

== Demographics ==
Historical population
Census	Pop.	Note	%±
1930	3,492		—
1940	5,237		50.0%
1950	6,051		15.5%
1960	8,119		34.2%
1970	11,859		46.1%
1980	18,599		56.8%
1990	25,773		38.6%
2000	36,210		40.5%
2010	39,140		8.1%
2020	39,619		1.2%
2025 (est.)	48,276	▲	21.9%
U.S. Decennial Census; 1790-1960 1900-1990; 1990-2000 2010-2019

=== Racial and ethnic composition ===
Hendry County, Florida – Racial and ethnic composition Note: the US Census treats Hispanic/Latino as an ethnic category. This table excludes Latinos from the racial categories and assigns them to a separate category. Hispanics/Latinos may be of any race.
Race / Ethnicity (NH = Non-Hispanic)	Pop 1980	Pop 1990	Pop 2000	Pop 2010	Pop 2020	% 1980	% 1990	% 2000	% 2010	% 2020
White alone (NH)	12,319	15,184	15,890	13,650	12,089	66.23%	58.91%	43.88%	34.87%	30.51%
Black or African American alone (NH)	3,412	4,185	5,245	5,057	4,195	18.35%	16.24%	14.48%	12.92%	10.59%
Native American or Alaska Native alone (NH)	417	527	210	580	155	2.24%	2.04%	0.58%	1.48%	0.39%
Asian alone (NH)	62	92	148	275	339	0.33%	0.36%	0.41%	0.70%	0.86%
Native Hawaiian or Pacific Islander alone (NH)	x	x	4	11	4	x	x	0.01%	0.03%	0.01%
Other race alone (NH)	0	28	36	49	120	0.00%	0.11%	0.10%	0.13%	0.30%
Mixed race or Multiracial (NH)	x	x	341	275	605	x	x	0.94%	0.70%	1.53%
Hispanic or Latino (any race)	2,389	5,757	14,336	19,243	22,112	12.84%	22.34%	39.59%	49.16%	55.81%
Total	18,599	25,773	36,210	39,140	39,619	100.00%	100.00%	100.00%	100.00%	100.00%

A map of the racial demographics in Hendry County, Florida by Census tract Legend: Hispanic 40–50% 50–60% 60–70% 70–80% 80–90% Non-Hispanic White 30–40% 40–50%

=== 2020 census ===
As of the 2020 census, the county had a population of 39,619. The median age was 35.3 years, 25.7% of residents were under the age of 18, and 14.2% were 65 years of age or older. For every 100 females there were 111.7 males, and for every 100 females age 18 and over there were 113.8 males age 18 and over.

As of the 2020 census, the racial makeup of the county was 46.6% White, 11.0% Black or African American, 1.6% American Indian and Alaska Native, 0.9% Asian, <0.1% Native Hawaiian and Pacific Islander, 20.2% from some other race, and 19.6% from two or more races. Hispanic or Latino residents comprised 55.8% of the population.

As of the 2020 census, 64.0% of residents lived in urban areas, while 36.0% lived in rural areas.

As of the 2020 census, there were 12,644 households, including 9,378 families, residing in the county. Of all households, 39.9% had children under the age of 18 living in them, 47.3% were married-couple households, 19.1% were households with a male householder and no spouse or partner present, and 25.2% were households with a female householder and no spouse or partner present. About 20.2% of all households were made up of individuals and 9.4% had someone living alone who was 65 years of age or older. There were 14,971 housing units, of which 15.5% were vacant. Among occupied housing units, 68.3% were owner-occupied and 31.7% were renter-occupied. The homeowner vacancy rate was 1.8% and the rental vacancy rate was 6.5%.

=== 2010 census ===
In 2010 the population of Hendry Country was 39,140. The racial and ethnic composition of the population was 34.9% non-Hispanic white, 13.4% black or African American, 1.7% Native American, 0.7% Asian, 0.1% Pacific Islander, 0.1% non-Hispanic reporting some other race, 2.7% reporting two or more races and 49.2% Hispanic or Latino.

=== 2000 census ===
As of the 2000 census, there were 36,210 people, 10,850 households, and 8,137 families residing in the county. The population density was 31 inhabitants per square mile (12/km^{2}). There were 12,294 housing units at an average density of 11 per square mile (4.2/km^{2}). The racial makeup of the county was 66.08% White, 14.75% Black or African American, 0.80% Native American, 0.45% Asian, 0.03% Pacific Islander, 14.67% from other races, and 3.22% from two or more races. 39.59% of the population were Hispanic or Latino of any race.

In 2000 there were 10,850 households, out of which 40.2% had children under the age of 18 living with them, 55.7% were married couples living together, 12.5% had a female householder with no husband present, and 25.0% were non-families. 18.6% of all households were made up of individuals, and 7.3% had someone living alone who was 65 years of age or older. The average household size was 3.09 and the average family size was 3.44.

In the county, the population was spread out, with 30.0% under the age of 18, 13.3% from 18 to 24, 28.3% from 25 to 44, 18.3% from 45 to 64, and 10.1% who were 65 years of age or older. The median age was 30 years. For every 100 females, there were 125.0 males. For every 100 females age 18 and over, there were 131.4 males.

The median income for a household in the county was $33,592, and the median income for a family was $34,902. Males had a median income of $25,896 versus $20,070 for females. The per capita income for the county was $13,663. About 16.9% of families and 24.1% of the population were below the poverty line, including 29.9% of those under age 18 and 15.0% of those age 65 or over.

== Politics ==
Hendry County is a Republican stronghold. It has seen increasing Republican support in recent presidential elections, with Donald Trump in 2024 performing better than any Republican since Reagan's 1984 landslide.

United States presidential election results for Hendry County, Florida
Year	Republican		Democratic		Third party(ies)	
Year	No.	%	No.	%	No.	%
1924	21	12.21%	132	76.74%	19	11.05%
1928	337	54.18%	266	42.77%	19	3.05%
1932	163	19.27%	683	80.73%	0	0.00%
1936	234	24.00%	741	76.00%	0	0.00%
1940	317	23.36%	1,040	76.64%	0	0.00%
1944	347	27.11%	933	72.89%	0	0.00%
1948	340	26.21%	699	53.89%	258	19.89%
1952	918	46.60%	1,052	53.40%	0	0.00%
1956	1,071	51.64%	1,003	48.36%	0	0.00%
1960	1,043	44.38%	1,307	55.62%	0	0.00%
1964	1,650	54.96%	1,352	45.04%	0	0.00%
1968	900	27.04%	791	23.76%	1,638	49.20%
1972	2,763	78.85%	739	21.09%	2	0.06%
1976	1,843	43.32%	2,337	54.94%	74	1.74%
1980	2,703	49.93%	2,543	46.97%	168	3.10%
1984	4,524	69.15%	2,018	30.85%	0	0.00%
1988	3,965	65.70%	2,036	33.74%	34	0.56%
1992	3,279	40.91%	2,691	33.57%	2,046	25.52%
1996	3,855	43.32%	3,885	43.66%	1,159	13.02%
2000	4,747	58.32%	3,240	39.81%	152	1.87%
2004	5,757	58.90%	3,960	40.51%	58	0.59%
2008	5,780	52.94%	4,998	45.78%	139	1.27%
2012	5,355	52.42%	4,751	46.51%	109	1.07%
2016	6,195	55.40%	4,615	41.27%	372	3.33%
2020	7,906	61.02%	4,929	38.04%	121	0.93%
2024	9,253	68.61%	4,096	30.37%	138	1.02%

=== Voter registration ===
According to the Secretary of State's office, Republicans are a plurality of registered voters in Hendry County.

Hendry County Voter Registration & Party Enrollment as of July 31, 2022
Political Party	Total Voters	Percentage
Republican	7,956	41.23%
Democratic	7,157	37.09%
No party affiliation	3,931	20.37%
Minor parties	251	1.30%
Total	19,295	100.00%

== Education ==
The School Board of Hendry County (SBHC) oversees public primary and secondary education for students in Hendry County. The SBHC maintains six elementary schools, with three each in Clewiston and LaBelle, and two middle schools, with one in Clewiston and the other in LaBelle. The county has two high schools – Clewiston High School and LaBelle High School. Additionally, the SBHC operates the Montura Early Learning Center, a Pre-K learning institute. There is also a tribal school affiliated with the Bureau of Indian Education (BIE), Ahfachkee School at the Big Cypress Indian Reservation.

The Clewiston Public Library in Clewiston, the Harlem Library, also in Clewiston and the Barron Library in Labelle, all make up the Hendry County Library Cooperative. The Clewiston Public Library, now known as the Harry T. Vaughn Library, came about in 1941 when the mayor at the time, asked the Garden Club to organize a library. They enlisted the help of a librarian from the Moore Haven High School to cataloged all the books and then prepared to open the library to the public. In 1967, the library moved to its permanent location, and in 1992, it was added to through funding from state and federal grants, the City of Clewiston, Hendry County, $100,000 from U.S. Sugar, and $57,510 from private donations. The mission of the cooperative, as taken from their website, is this: "The mission of the Hendry County Library Cooperative is to provide its citizens with access to materials and information for work, school, and personal life that are both educational and entertaining".

Few post-secondary institutions exist in Hendry County. Florida SouthWestern State College has an outreach program campus in LaBelle. Neighboring Collier and Lee counties have several colleges and universities, including Ave Maria University in Ave Maria and campuses of Barry University, Florida SouthWestern State College, Keiser University, and Rasmussen University in Fort Myers. In western Palm Beach County, a campus of Palm Beach State College is located in Belle Glade.

== Archaeology ==
- Tony's Mound

== Communities ==
=== Cities ===
- Clewiston
- LaBelle

=== Census-designated places ===
- Fort Denaud
- Harlem
- Montura
- Pioneer
- Port LaBelle (Pt LaBelle units 1-9)

=== Other unincorporated communities ===
- Banyan Village (Pt LaBelle units 10-13)
- Everhigh Acres
- Felda
- Flaghole (officially Seven K Estates)
- LaDeca Acres
- Midway Acres
- Port LaBelle Acreage
- Wheeler Road

== Transportation ==
=== Roads ===
- US 27
- SR 29
- SR 78
- SR 80

=== Airports ===
- Airglades Airport
- LaBelle Municipal Airport

== In popular culture ==
- In Carl Hiaasen's novel Skinny Dip, agribusiness executive "Red" Hammernut has his offices in LaBelle, and owns significant areas of farmland in Hendry County.
- A scene from Just Cause, a 1995 suspense crime thriller film directed by Arne Glimcher and starring Sean Connery and Laurence Fishburne, was filmed in Fort Denaud, Florida.

== See also ==
- Florida Heartland
- National Register of Historic Places listings in Hendry County, Florida
