= José de Urrutia (explorer) =

Basque Spanish explorer and settler of Texas

- Born: 1678; Guipuzcoa, Basque Country, Spain
- Died: July 16, 1741 (aged 62–63); San Antonio, Texas
- Occupations: Explorer and captain of San Antonio de Béjar Presidio

José de Urrutia (c. 1678 to 1741) was a Basque Spanish explorer and settler of Texas, who became captain of San Antonio de Béjar Presidio and lived for seven years with several Native American tribes, leading campaigns against their enemies, the Apaches, in East Texas. He "was made" General Captain of all the Native American peoples that were enemies to the Apache people.

== Early life ==
Urrutia was born in Guipuzcoa, Basque Country, Spain around 1678. He became a soldier along his brother Toribio.

== Career ==
Urrutia and his brother participated in the Domingo Teran de los Rios expedition. They settled in Texas sometime before 1691. During this time, Urrutia and his brother were part of the garrison settled in the vicinity the Neches River. Many of the soldiers who were exploring with Domingo Teran de los Rios left Texas in the winter of 1693, due to the increasing hostility of Texas Amerindians.

Shortly after, José de Urrutia had an accident on the San Marcos River, (scholars now believe it was actually on the Colorado River). His injury, forced him to stay with the Native American tribes settled near of the place. Three soldiers chose to stay with him. Urrutia lived with several Amerindian peoples for seven years, particularly with the Kanohatinos, Xarames and Tohos tribes and established important links with them. He managed to learn quickly both their language and their customs, which earned him the respect of the tribes for him. He became "captain General" of all nations hostile to the Apaches, and led several wars against the Apache tribes. In 1696, he returned to Mexico. There, he held a prominent position in the Spanish military. In 1700, after the founding of Mission San Juan Bautista, he resumed his explorations in Texas.

After settling in San Antonio, Urrutia was named captain of Presidio San Antonio de Bexar on July 23, 1733. Over the next forty years, he established relationships with other indigenous peoples in Texas, as well as several in Coahuila and Nuevo Leon. However, his hatred for the Apaches remained, and in the winter of 1739, Urrutia declared another war against them in San Saba. Urrutia died on July 16, 1741.

== Personal life ==
On 7 January 1697, Urrutia married Antonia Ramon, with whom he had a daughter, Antonia. The couple were married in the parish church of Santiago Apostol, Monclova, in the state of Coahuila, Mexico. After the death of his first wife during childbirth, Urrutia had a second wife, Rosa Flores, with whom he had ten children (six sons and four daughters), including Toribio de Urrutia, who also become captain of the Presidio de Bexar.

== See also ==
- Hernando de Escalante Fontaneda
