= Thomas J. Pluckhahn =

Thomas Pluckhahn
- Born: 1966 (age 59–60); St. Paul, Minnesota
- Occupation: Anthropologist

Thomas Pluckhahn is an assistant professor in the Department of Anthropology at the University of South Florida. Pluckhahn specializes in the field of anthropology include Eastern United States Prehistory, Mesoamerican Prehistory, Cultural Resource Management, Settlement Pattern Studies, Archaeology of Households, Environmental Anthropology, Ceramic Analysis, and GIS Applications for Anthropology.

== Biography ==
Pluckhahn was born in St. Paul, Minnesota in 1966. In 1984, he received an alumni scholarship to the University of Georgia, from which he graduated in 1988 with an A.B., cum laude with honors in Anthropology.

=== Field work ===
From 1989 until 1992, he worked as an archaeological field technician for various firms in the eastern United States and Europe. From 1993 until 1994, Pluckhahn worked as a Project Archaeologist for Brockington and Associates in Norcross, Georgia. He then became a consulting archaeologist for Southern Research at Fort Stewart Military Reservation in Georgia, and a senior archaeologist for Southern Archaeological Services, Athens, Georgia; he served in the latter position until 2003. After two years Pluckhahn returned to his alma mater in 1996 to become a graduate teaching assistant in the Department of Anthropology at the University of Georgia.

=== Academic work ===
While working as a teaching assistant Pluckhahn did some fieldwork at the Shoulderbone Tract located in Hancock County. While the work was not long, only lasting from 6 January 1997 until the end of the month, it would provide the basis for his first fully published book. Written in 1997 "An Archeological Survey of the Shoulderbone Tract, Hancock County, Georgia" describes the work that was done in the Tract which was a mound complex located on a terrace north of Whitten Creek. While Pluckhahn described the work as “minimal, and focusing on defining and demarcating the limits of the site so that it may be fenced.” he does go on to admit that “Most of the fieldwork, however was devoted to an extensive archeological survey of the property.”

=== Kolomoki ===
In 1998, Pluckhahn became an instructor at Georgia, and in 1999 became the field supervisor at the Mixteca Alta Settlement Pattern Survey in Oaxaca, Mexico. In the same year he traveled back east to become the field director of the Kolomoki: Learning about a Woodland Ceremonial Center located in Georgia. During this time he helped excavate the famed mound site of Kolomoki in the lower Chattahoochee River Valley of southwest Georgia. From 1999 until 2001, he served as a field director at Kolomoki in a study founded by the National Geographic Society.

During his time at Kolomoki, Pluckhahn worked with others to excavate the site of Kolomoki examining everything from pottery to the mounds themselves. This excavation was intended to discover how Native Americans lived during Kolomoki's days as an important cultural center. After extensive studies on the evidence uncovered during the excavation, an important discovery was made involving the dating that had previously been applied. Before the excavation, previous archaeologists had placed the date of the Kolomoki mounds in the Mississippian Period (c. 1000-1500 AD), but Dr. Pluckhahn however, discovered that the main date of occupation was closer to the Woodland Period (c. 350-750 AD).

=== Ph.D ===
In 2002, Thomas earned his Ph.D. from the University of Georgia, writing his dissertation on his experiences and findings at Kolomoki. After working as an instructor for Georgia, Pluckhahn became the visiting assistant professor of the Department of Anthropology at the University of Oklahoma in 2003. He served in this position until 2004 when he became the assistant professor in the Department of Anthropology.

=== Kolomoki book ===
While at Oklahoma, Pluckhahn released "Kolomoki: Settlement, Ceremony, and Status in the Deep South, A.D. 350 to 750". He applied his fieldwork from the Kolomoki site, as well as his discoveries of the new timeline of the Kolomoki mounds. The analysis in the book supports the evidence of Kolomki's actual occupation, while also answering questions about middle-range societies, their use of ceremony and its effect on status.

=== Light on the Path, book ===
Pluckhahn served as the visiting assistant professor of the Department of Anthropology until 2004, when he became the assistant professor in the Department of Anthropology at the University of Oklahoma. He served in this position for two more years. In 2006 he released the book "Light on the Path: The Anthropology and History of the Southeastern Indians". In this book Pluckhahn, along with Robbie Ethridge, provide new ideas for viewing the history of Native Americans in the Southeast.

A major component of the book deals with the recent ability to connect the periods of the sixteenth-century Late Mississippian period to the eighteenth-century colonial period. Pluckhahn and Ethridge claim in the book to be able to bridge the two centuries together, while filling in the previously mysterious seventeenth-century. This linkage has provided a crucial new way to view the ancestry of the southeastern United States that is invaluable to not only archaeologist and anthropologist, but historians as well.

== Selected articles and books ==
- Kolomoki: Settlement, Ceremony, and Status in the Deep South, c. 350 to 750 AD. Thomas J. Pluckhahn. 2003. University of Alabama Press, Tuscaloosa
- Light on the Path: The Anthropology and History of the Southeastern Indians. University of Alabama Press,(Thomas J. Pluckhahn, and Robbie F. Ethridge editors). 2006. University of Alabama Press, Tuscaloosa
- Origins of the Ñuu: Archaeology in the Mixteca Alta, Mexico. University Press of Colorado, Boulder..(Stephen A. Kowalewski,., Andrew K. Balkansky, Laura R. Stiver Walsh, Thomas J. Pluckhahn, John F. Chamblee, Verónica, Pérez Rodríguez, Verenice Y. Heredia Espinoza, and Charlotte A. Smith) 2006. University Press of Colorado, Boulder. Under contract.
- Reflections on Paddle Stamped Pottery: Symmetry Analysis of Swift Creek Paddle Designs from Kolomoki. 2007. Southeastern Archaeology 26(1):1-11.
- “The Mounds Themselves Might Be Perfectly Happy in Their Surroundings”: The “Kolomoki Problem” in Notesand Letters. The Florida Anthropologist 60(2–3):63-76.
- "Woodland Prehistoric Period", The New Georgia Encyclopedia. 2001. edited by John Inscoe. University of Georgia Press, Athens.
- "Kolomoki Mounds Site", The New Georgia Encyclopedia. 2001. edited by John Inscoe. University of Georgia Press. Athens. Fifty Years Since Sears: Deconstructing the Domestic Sphere at Kolomoki. 2000. Southeastern Archaeology 19(2):145-155.
- Transportation Corridors and Political Evolution in Highland Mesoamerica: Settlement Analyses Incorporating GIS for Northern Tlaxcala, Mexico. 2007. (David Manuel Carballo, and Thomas J. Pluckhahn) Journal of Anthropological Archaeology 26(4):607-629.
