= John Mann Goggin =

Anthropologist (1916–1963)

John Mann Goggin (May 27, 1916, Chicago – May 4, 1963, Gainesville) was a cultural anthropologist in the southwest, southeast, Mexico, and Caribbean, primarily focusing on the ethnology, cultural history, and typology of artifacts from archaeological sites.

== Biography ==
Shortly after John M. Goggin's birth, his family moved to Miami, Florida, where Goggin's father, a dentist, had set up practice. Goggin would spend his early years here. Roaming in the Everglades, Goggin formed a thriving interest in the cultural history and ethnology of the region. Throughout high school, Goggin began collecting archaeological artifacts and exploring sites that he personally found, further establishing his love for the field of anthropological archaeology.

Goggin began his undergraduate work at the University of Florida in Gainesville, but did not complete his B.A at the university. It was here that he composed his first paper, "A Ceramic Sequence in South Florida", which explores the chronology of different pottery types of the Florida Natives. Soon he transferred to the University of New Mexico, where he received his B.A. in Anthropology in 1938.

Goggin remained in New Mexico for the next few years, continuing field work on the Pueblo Indians while maintaining part-time graduate studies at the University of New Mexico. From 1941 to 1942, he held the position of curator for the Coronado State Monument which supplied Goggin with further experience in his inherent appreciation for artifacts.

With the United States' involvement in World War II, Goggin took on the work as an engineer at Florida airports that were under construction. Physical disabilities left Goggin inadequate for overseas military efforts, but did not prevent his aid at the home front. After the war, Yale Peabody Museum offered Goggin an assistantship in favor of his excavations of F.H. Sommer III at upper Matecumbe Key. This made graduate work at Yale in anthropology possible for Goggin. Later, he received his M.A. from Yale in 1946 and then a Ph.D. in 1948 under the instruction of lifetime colleague, Irving Rouse.

Upon his receiving his Ph.D. from Yale in 1948, Goggin returned to the University of Florida as Associate Professor of Anthropology in the joint department of Sociology and Anthropology; this was the first appointment by a university to Anthropology in the entire state of Florida. Goggin's enthusiasm and love for anthropology spread to his students as enrollment in his classes continued to increase year after year. Goggin took every opportunity he could to work directly with his students, either in the field or in the archaeology laboratories that Goggin personally developed with the help of his peers. Goggin persisted in educating his students on the importance of ecology, ethnology, and history within archaeology. His teaching and love for anthropology inspired his students and enthusiasts to create an explosion in amateur archaeology in and around Florida throughout his lifetime.

Goggin, with the help of peers in Florida, founded the Florida Anthropological Society, where he held the position of editor of the group's journal from 1949 to 1951. He also served as editor of American Antiquity, from 1950 to 1954. In 1951, Goggin was made the first foreign member of Junta Nacional de Arqueología y Etnología in Cuba. While acquiring all these credentials, he was an active member in the Florida Academy of Sciences, the Florida Historical Society, the Society for American Archaeology, and the Southeastern Archaeology Conference.

In 1961, he was promoted to full Professor and Acting Head of the new Anthropology Department. Then in 1963, he was made Research Professor of Anthropology when his terminal cancer hindered his ability to work as instructor. He maintained a permanent address and a base of operation in Florida from 1948 to his death in 1963.

== Ideology ==
Goggin's main study interest was the interaction between colonists and the natives. Therefore, most of his fieldwork was done in old colonial areas throughout Florida and the Caribbean, with the exception of the work done while in attendance at the University of New Mexico. Between 1936 and 1960 he spent a total of three and a half years doing field work in Mexico; he paid 30 visits to the Caribbean, while maintaining constant work in Florida.

The main themes and ideology behind Goggin's work laid in his appreciation for the collection and examination of artifacts. Goggin attempted to set all the artifacts from a certain site into a chronology paying particular attention to typology, functions, construction, and where, in accordance to stratification, the objects lay. Beyond these specifications to research, Goggin used all the aspects of anthropology, archaeology, ethnology, history, and natural history, as a lens in which he would establish a chronology of artifacts.

He expressed his distrust in sampling early on. As a collector of artifacts he found sampling very dangerous to the preservation of tangible history. While working and schooling in New Mexico, Goggin developed his own method of "controlled sample collecting". In this method he marked off 16 parts of the surface ground at Goodland Point midden. He collected and seriated the samples separately in order to establish a chronology of five distinct periods, and used the process to determine a theory of midden building for South Florida.

While at Yale, Goggin continued to study the cultural history of Florida. For his dissertation, he created a chronology of Florida's history based on locations and periods with evidence of solid wood given way to "cultural patterns". He presented his argument and evidence from a standpoint of ethnohistory, ethnology, and archaeology. The section of the dissertation specifically dealing with the Lower St. Johns area was later edited and published as the monograph Space and Time Perspective in Northern St. Johns Archaeology, Florida.

Goggin's theories on chronology of specimens and his revolutionary approach to archeology paved the way for modern archaeologists such as the late William C. Sturtevant (1926–2007). Though he died well before he became a nationally renowned anthropologist, his ideology became fundamental in modern anthropology. Goggin refused to be called an archaeologist in favor of his all-encompassing view on the subject. More specifically, he mapped out the first cultural and natural history of Florida. Goggin incorporated archaeology, anthropology, ethnography, history, and natural history to assign a chronological history to a cultural group based on trends and "cultural patterns".

== Major publications ==
- Space and Time Perspective in Northern St. Johns Archeology, Florida. Yale University Publications in Anthropology, No. 47. 147 pp. New Haven. University of Florida Press, 1998
- Indian and Spanish: Selected Writings (edited by Charles H. Fairbanks, Irving Rouse, and William C. Sturtevant). University of Miami, Coral Gables, 1964.

== Notes ==
=== References ===
- Baerreis, David A. (1965). "Reviewed: Indian and Spanish selected writings". Ethnohistory. 12 (2): 185. doi:10.2307/480620. JSTOR 480620.
- Goggin, John M. (1947). "A preliminary definition of archaeological areas and periods in Florida". American Antiquity. 13 (2): 114–127. doi:10.2307/275684. JSTOR 275684. S2CID 161708160.
- Goggin, John M. (1950). "Stratigraphic tests in the Everglades National Park". American Antiquity. 15 (3): 228–246. doi:10.2307/276765. JSTOR 276765. S2CID 162254485.
- Reutiman, Lisa (2003). "John Mann Goggin: 1916-1963". Emuseum @ Minnesota State University. Mankato, MN: Minnesota State University. Archived from the original on 3 June 2010.
- Rouse, Irving (1964). "John Mann Goggin, 1916-1963". American Antiquity. 29 (3): 369–375. doi:10.1017/S0002731600011811. JSTOR 277876.
- Sturtevant, William C. (1964). "John Mann Goggin, 1916-1963". American Anthropologist. New Series. 66 (2): 385–394. doi:10.1525/aa.1964.66.2.02a00130.
