= Jerald T. Milanich =

American anthropologist

Dr. Jerald Milanich
- Education: University of Florida
- Awards: Lifetime Achievement Award from the Florida Archaeological Council
- Scientific career
- Fields: Anthropologist; Archaeologist
- Workplaces: Florida Museum of Natural History

Jerald T. Milanich is an American anthropologist and archaeologist, specializing in Native American culture in Florida. He is Curator Emeritus of Archaeology at the Florida Museum of Natural History at the University of Florida in Gainesville; adjunct professor, Department of Anthropology, College of Arts and Sciences at the University of Florida; and adjunct professor, Center for Latin American Studies at the University of Florida. Milanich holds a Ph.D in anthropology from the University of Florida.

Milanich has won several awards for his books. Milanich won the Lifetime Achievement Award from the Florida Archaeological Council in 2005 and the Dorothy Dodd Lifetime Achievement Award from the Florida Historical Society in 2013. He was inducted as a Fellow into the American Academy of Arts and Sciences in 2010.

Milanich's research interests include Eastern United States archeology, pre-Columbian Southeastern U.S. native peoples, and colonial period native American-European/Anglo relations in the America. In May 1987 he was cited in a New York Times article on de Soto written by John Noble Wilford.

Milanich is married to anthropologist Maxine Margolis, also a professor at the University of Florida. They are the parents of historian Nara Milanich, who teaches at Columbia University.

== Books ==
- With Samuel Proctor, editors. Tacachale: essays on the Indians of Florida and southeastern Georgia during the historic period. The University Presses of Florida. (1978)
- First Encounters: Spanish explorations in the Caribbean and the United States, 1492–1570. University of Florida Press. (1989)
- Earliest Hispanic/Native American interactions in the American Southeast. Garland. (1991)
- With Charles Hudson. Hernando de Soto and the Indians of Florida. University Press of Florida. (1993)
- Archaeology of Precolumbian Florida. University Press of Florida. (1994)
- The Timucua. Blackwell Publications, Oxford, UK. (1996)
- Florida Indians and the Invasion from Europe. The University Press of Florida. (1998)
- Florida Indians from Ancient Times to the Present. The University Press of Florida. (1998)
- Laboring in the Fields of the Lord: Spanish Missions and Southeastern Indians Washington, D.C., Smithsonian Institution Press. (1999)
- Famous Florida Sites—Mt. Royal and Crystal River Gainesville, University Press of Florida (1999)
- Florida's Lost Tribes—Through the Eyes of an Artist Gainesville, University Press of Florida. (With artist Theodore Morris.) (2004)
- Archaeology of northern Florida, A.D. 200–900: the McKeithen Weeden Island culture. (2004)
- Frolicking Bears, Wet Vultures, And Other Oddities: A New York City Journalist in Nineteenth-Century Florida. Gainesville, University Press of Florida (2005)
- Laboring in the fields of the Lord: Spanish missions and southeastern Indians. University Press of Florida. (2006)
