= Hernando de Escalante Fontaneda =

Spanish shipwreck survivor

- Born: 1536; Cartagena, Colombia
- Died: Unknown

Hernando de Escalante Fontaneda (c. 1536 – after 1575, dates uncertain) was a Spanish shipwreck survivor who lived among the Native Americans of Florida for 17 years. His circa 1575 memoir, Memoria de las cosas y costa y indios de la Florida, is one of the most valuable contemporary accounts of American Indian life from that period. The manuscript can be found in the General Archive of the Indies. In all, he produced five documents describing the peoples of Native Florida.

== Biography ==
Escalante Fontaneda was the second son of Garcia de Escalante and Ana de Aldana. His father was a Spanish official in South America. Escalante Fontaneda was born in Cartagena, Colombia, around 1536. In 1549, when Escalante Fontaneda was 13, his brother and he were sailing to Spain, to study in Salamanca, when their ship was wrecked on the coast of Florida.

The surviving crew and passengers were captured by the Calusa, who enslaved them and eventually sacrificed most of them, including Escalante Fontaneda's brother. Escalante Fontaneda apparently escaped death by correctly interpreting their commands to sing and dance for them. He spent the next 17 years living among the Calusa and other tribes, learning several languages and travelling extensively through Florida.

Around 1566, Escalante Fontaneda was rescued from his captivity by Pedro Menéndez de Avilés, Florida's first Spanish governor and founder of St. Augustine, who bargained for Fontaneda's freedom from the chief of the Calusa, who was called King Carlos by the Spanish. He served as an interpreter and guide for Menéndez on a number of missions for the next several years, and returned to Spain in 1569 to reclaim his parents' property from the Crown. In 1575, he wrote his memoir, which proved valuable to historians of the day such as Antonio de Herrera y Tordesillas, and remains so today.

Besides the memoir (memoria), which is eight folios long, a memorandum, a list of caciques, and two fragments of text attributed to Fontaneda, each of one folio, have been identified.

Escalante Fontaneda provides the city of Tampa's earliest written mention. He names 22 important villages of the Calusa, the first being "Tanpa". He gives no details concerning the exact location of Tanpa, but archaeologist Jerald Milanich places the Calusa village of Tanpa at the mouth of Charlotte Harbor, the original "Bay of Tanpa". A later Spanish expedition did not notice Charlotte Harbor while sailing north along the west coast of Florida and assumed that the current Tampa Bay was the bay they sought. The name was accidentally transferred north.

His memoir also contributed to the development of the Fountain of Youth legend by discussing the Native belief in the healing waters and providing an early mention of Juan Ponce de León's supposed search for the waters in Florida.

== See also ==
- José de Urrutia (explorer)
- Calusa language
