= Clewiston micropolitan area =

Statistical area in Florida, US

Coordinates: 26.7522°N 80.9350°W

Clewiston Area
- Micropolitan Statistical Area
- Clewiston, FL Micropolitan Statistical Area
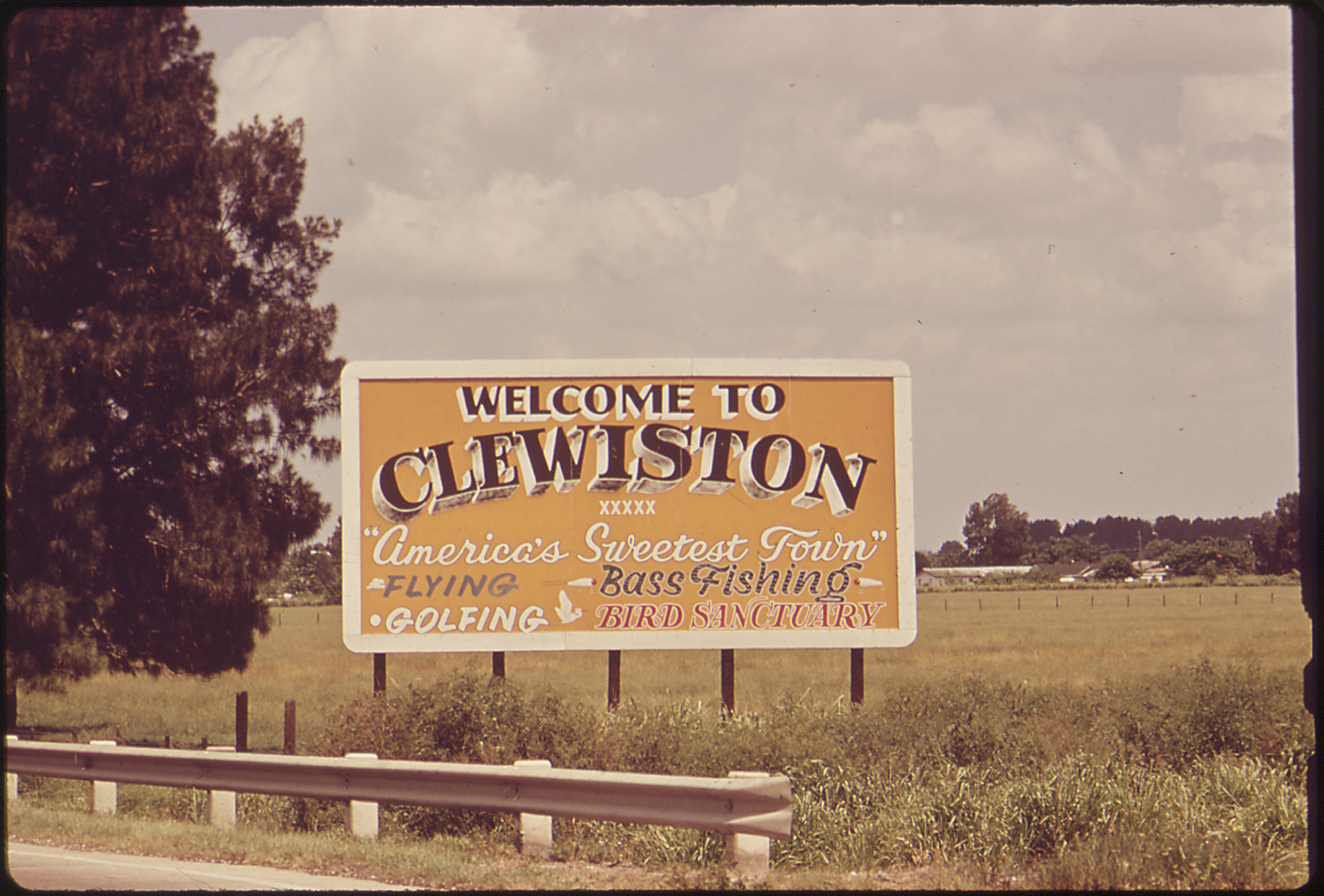
Interactive Map of Clewiston, FL
Micropolitan Area
Clewiston, FL μSA
Cape Coral–Fort Myers–Naples, FL CSA
- Country: United States
- State(s): Florida
- Time zone: UTC−05:00 (EST)
  - Summer (DST): UTC−04:00 (EDT)

The Clewiston micropolitan area is a micropolitan statistical area (μSA) defined by the U.S. Office of Management and Budget. It consists of Glades and Hendry counties in Florida, with Clewiston, Florida as the principal city. The μSA was first defined in 2003, consisting solely of Hendry County. Glades County was added to the μSA in 2023.

== See also ==
- Florida census statistical areas
