= List of Horizon (British TV series) episodes =

Horizon is a current and long-running BBC popular science and philosophy documentary programme. Series one was broadcast in 1964 and as of July 2020 it is in its 56th series. Over 1,250 episodes have been broadcast (including specials) with an average of 23 episodes per series during the 56-year run.

- 1964–1969 – 135 episodes
- 1970–1979 – 299 episodes
- 1980–1989 – 234 episodes
- 1990–1999 – 220 episodes
- 2000–2009 – 191 episodes
- 2010–2019 – 167 episodes
- Since 2020 – 19 episodes

== Series 1: 1964–1965 ==
Title	Original broadcast date	Episode
"The World of Buckminster Fuller"	2 May 1964	1
"Pesticides and Posterity"	30 May 1964	2
"A Candle to Nature"	27 June 1964	3
"Strangeness Minus Three"	25 July 1964	4
"The Air of Science"	22 August 1964	5
"The Knowledge Explosion"	21 September 1964	6
"The Amateur Scientist"	19 October 1964	7
"Tots and Quots and Woodgerie"	16 November 1964	8
"Professor J.B.S. Haldane, Obituary"	1 December 1964	9
"Science, Toys and Magic"	14 December 1964	10
"Learning from Machines"	6 January 1965	11
"The Technique of Change"	20 January 1965	12
"Star Gazers"	3 February 1965	13
"Science and Art"	17 February 1965	14
"The Great Computer Scandal / H-Bomb Detectors"	3 March 1965	15
"Forbidden Events / I am a Madman"	17 March 1965	16
"Restless Genius / Faster, Farther, Higher"	31 March 1965	17
"Other Side of the Pill / Search for the Original Mind"	14 April 1965	18
"The Big Smoke / The Model Makers"	12 May 1965	19
"The Long Slide / Men with Gills"	26 May 1965	20
"Men and Sharks / Sir Henry Dale, OM, FRS"	9 June 1965	21
"The Brain Gain / The Sudden Night / Learning to Speak"	23 June 1965	22
"Dr. Joseph Needham / Mariner 4"	14 July 1965	23
"Science Fiction : Science Fact / Alone and Unarmed"	28 July 1965	24
"Certain of Uncertainty / State of Nature"	11 August 1965	25
"Time Stood Still / Weighty Matters"	25 August 1965	26
"Fuel for the Future / Collector's Piece"	8 September 1965	27
"Let Newton Be"	22 September 1965	28

== Series 2: 1965–1966 ==
Title	Original broadcast date	Episode
"Special Senses"	10 October 1965	1
"An Affair of the Heart"	24 October 1965	2
"10,000 Tombs"	7 November 1965	3
"Toil, Sweat & Tears"	21 November 1965	4
"The Big Dishes / The Living Stream"	5 December 1965	5
"Boys on Bubbles / Problems and Puzzles"	19 December 1965	6
"Windows of the Soul / Elixir of Youth"	2 January 1966	7
"The Troubled Mind / Triple-A. S."	16 January 1966	8
"A Man of Two Visions / The Scientist Applied"	30 January 1966	9
"The Dolphins that Joined The Navy / A Theory of The Earth"	13 February 1966	10
"Route 128 / A Theory of The Earth"	27 February 1966	11
"The Beginning of Life / Science Friction"	13 March 1966	12
"So you want to be an Inventor? / The Severed Hand"	27 March 1966	13
"Chance and Decay / Meteorite Mystery"	10 April 1966	14
"Towers of Ilium / The Exploding City"	24 April 1966	15
"Man in Space"	8 May 1966	16
"Destination Mars / Editors in Conference"	22 May 1966	17
"Man meets Duck / The Picture Machines"	5 June 1966	18
"Where must the Money Go? / Phantoms Incorporated"	19 June 1966	19
"Genes in Action / Scientists and War"	3 July 1966	20
"The Lonely Children"	17 July 1966	21
"Man of Science / 'Nature' Tomorrow"	31 July 1966	22
"Science Fiction, Science Fact / The Dolphins that Joined The Navy"	11 September 1966	23
"M.I.T.'s ABC / The Disturbed Child"	25 September 1966	24

== Series 3: 1966–1967 ==
Title	Original broadcast date	Episode
"Ten Years in the Antarctic"	10 October 1966	1
"The Athlete"	24 October 1966	2
"From Peenemunde to the Moon"	7 November 1966	3
"Sex-Change?"	21 November 1966	4
"The Structure of Life"	5 December 1966	5
"Hand Me My Sword, Humphrey"	25 December 1966	6
"Sons of Cain"	17 January 1967	7
"How Best to Make a Man, How Best to Make a Scientist"	14 February 1967	8
"Dynamo, The Life of Michael Faraday"	28 February 1967	9
"Migraine"	14 March 1967	10
"How Safe Is Surgery?"	28 March 1967	11
"The Shape of War to Come"	25 April 1967	12
"Memory"	9 May 1967	13
"Masters of the Desert"	23 May 1967	14
"Cancer, The Smoker's Gamble"	20 June 1967	15
"Science and the Supernatural"	4 July 1967	16
"Hypnosis"	18 July 1967	17

== Series 4: 1967–1968 ==
Title	Original broadcast date	Episode
"The War of the Boffins"	12 September 1967	1
"Aspects of Alcohol"	26 September 1967	2
"Lords of the Sea"	10 October 1967	3
"Will Art Last?"	24 October 1967	4
"Air Safety, The Unknown Factor"	7 November 1967	5
"The Life and Death of the Pine Processionary"	21 November 1967	6
"Koestler on Creativity"	5 December 1967	7
"The World of Ted Serios"	12 December 1967	8
"Professor in Toyland"	24 December 1967	9
"An Ingenious Man, Sir H. John Baker"	2 January 1968	10
"Man's Best Friend"	30 January 1968	11
"Once a Junkie"	13 February 1968	12
"Town Traffic and Tomorrow"	27 February 1968	13
"The Man Makers"	12 March 1968	14
"Man in Search of Himself"	26 March 1968	15
"Investigating Murder"	9 April 1968	16
"The Equation of Murder"	7 May 1968	17

== Series 5: 1968–1969 ==
Title	Original broadcast date	Episode
"Lindemann Enigma"	12 September 1968	1
"From Field to Factory"	19 September 1968	2
"Comfort on Ageing"	26 September 1968	3
"Experiments in War"	3 October 1968	4
"African Medicine"	17 October 1968	5
"The Broken Bridge"	24 October 1968	6
"Children Without Words"	31 October 1968	7
"Computer Revolution"	7 November 1968	8
"Doctor's Dilemma"	14 November 1968	9
"In the Matter of Dr Alfred Nobel"	21 November 1968	10
"Wheels Within Wheels"	28 November 1968	11
"Black Man – White Science"	5 December 1968	12
"Hidden World"	12 December 1968	13
"The Talgai Skull"	19 December 1968	14
"Phantasmagoria, The Magic Lantern"	24 December 1968	15
"Inside Every Fat Man..."	2 January 1969	16
"If Only They Could Speak"	9 January 1969	17
"The Miraculous Wonder, The Human Eye"	16 January 1969	18
"The Year of the Locusts"	23 January 1969	19
"The Gifted Child"	30 January 1969	20
"The Last of the Polymaths"	6 February 1969	21
"Music and the Mind"	13 February 1969	22
"Report on V.D."	20 February 1969	23
"The Drift from Science"	6 March 1969	24
"Powers of Persuasion"	13 March 1969	25
"The View from Space"	20 March 1969	26
"The Unborn Patient"	27 March 1969	27
"King Solomon's Garden"	10 April 1969	28
"Muck Today – Poison Tomorrow"	24 April 1969	29
"Shark"	1 May 1969	30
"Technology and Self Determination"	15 May 1969	31
"After Apollo"	22 May 1969	32
"Discovery"	29 May 1969	33
"Machines and People"	5 June 1969	34

== Series 6: 1969–1970 ==
Title	Original broadcast date	Episode
"Science on Safari"	15 September 1969	1
"A True Madness"	22 September 1969	2
"The Problem of Pain"	29 September 1969	3
"Four Fast Legs and a Nose"	6 October 1969	4
"Father of the Man"	13 October 1969	5
"Master of the Microscope"	20 October 1969	6
"CERN"	27 October 1969	7
"Cancer"	10 November 1969	8
"There's a Rhino in My Sugar"	17 November 1969	9
"Fit to Live"	24 November 1969	10
"Don't Cackle, Lay Eggs"	1 December 1969	11
"How Much Do You Drink?"	8 December 1969	12
"A Game of War"	15 December 1969	13
"Bread"	22 December 1969	14
"For the Safety of Mankind"	29 December 1969	15
"Just Another World"	5 January 1970	16
"Henry Royce, Mechanic"	12 January 1970	17
"A Disease of Our Time, Stress"	19 January 1970	18
"A Disease of Our Time, Heart Attacks"	26 January 1970	19
"Sex and Sexuality"	2 February 1970	20
"Whose Coast?"	16 February 1970	21
"A Much Wanted Child"	23 February 1970	22
"The Expert Witness"	2 March 1970	23
"After the Iron Age"	9 March 1970	24
"Let the Therapy Fit the Crime"	16 March 1970	25
"The World Outside"	23 March 1970	26
"In the Beginning Was the Word"	30 March 1970	27
"Drifting of the Continents"	13 April 1970	28
"A Case of Priority"	20 April 1970	29
"The Fretful Elements"	27 April 1970	30
"One Man's Meat"	11 May 1970	31
"Only Skin Deep"	6 July 1970	32
"Wolves and Wolfmen"	13 July 1970	33
"A Measure of Uncertainty"	10 August 1970	34
"The Manhunters"	17 August 1970	35
"Don't Get Sick in America"	24 August 1970	36
"Crown of Thorns"	31 August 1970	37

== Series 7: 1970–1971 ==
Title	Original broadcast date	Episode
"Noah's Ark in Kensington"	7 September 1970	1
"Virus"	14 September 1970	2
"Water, Water..."	21 September 1970	3
"All Creatures Great and Small"	28 September 1970	4
"Child for a Lifetime"	5 October 1970	5
"Something for Our Children"	12 October 1970	6
"Million Ton Tanker"	2 November 1970	7
"The Insect War"	9 November 1970	8
"The Savage Mind"	16 November 1970	9
"Tanks"	23 November 1970	10
"Mind the Machine"	30 November 1970	11
"Square Pegs"	7 December 1970	12
"Earthquakes, The City That Waits to Die"	14 December 1970	13
"The Man Who Talks to Frogs"	21 December 1970	14
"The Gargantuan Triumph of Science"	28 December 1970	15
"Wildlife, The Last Great Battle"	4 January 1971	16
"Great Ormond Street"	18 January 1971	17
"A Bulldozer Through Heaven"	25 January 1971	18
"Rumours of Wars"	1 February 1971	19
"I'm Dependent, You're Addicted"	15 February 1971	20
"Kuru, To Tremble with Fear"	22 February 1971	21
"Due to Lack of Interest Tomorrow Has Been Cancelled"	8 March 1971	22
"What Kind of Doctor?"	15 March 1971	23
"A Nice Sort of Accident to Have"	22 March 1971	24
"The Wood"	5 April 1971	25
"The Measure of Man"	12 April 1971	26
"Three Score Years and Then?"	26 April 1971	27
"Darwin's Bulldog"	3 May 1971	28
"The Secret"	10 May 1971	29
"What Every Girl Should Know"	17 May 1971	30
"Taste of Foods to Come"	24 May 1971	31
"Looking for a Happy Landing"	31 May 1971	32
"A Case of Depression"	7 June 1971	33
"The Total War Machine"	14 June 1971	34
"The Dinosaur Hunters"	21 June 1971	35

== Series 8: 1971–1972 ==
Title	Original broadcast date	Episode
"Your Country Needs You"	27 September 1971	1
"Rheumatism"	4 October 1971	2
"If at First You Don't Succeed... You Don't Succeed"	11 October 1971	3
"One Liverpool or Two?"	18 October 1971	4
"Rutherford, The Cavendish Today"	25 October 1971	5
"The Fierce People"	1 November 1971	6
"The Men Who Painted Caves"	15 November 1971	7
"The Crab Nebula"	22 November 1971	8
"Can Venice Survive?"	29 November 1971	9
"Willingly to School?"	6 December 1971	10
"The Periscope War"	20 December 1971	11
"Patently Absurd"	27 December 1971	12
"The Missing Link"	3 January 1972	13
"Navajo: The Last Red Indians"	10 January 1972	14
"How Much Do You Smell?"	17 January 1972	15
"Parasite of Paradise"	31 January 1972	16
"The Day It Rained Periwinkles"	7 February 1972	17
"Are You Doing This for Me Doctor?"	14 February 1972	18
"How They Sold Doomsday"	21 February 1972	19
"For Love or Money"	28 February 1972	20
"Whales, Dolphins and Men"	6 March 1972	21
"What Is Race?"	13 March 1972	22
"Man Made Lakes of Africa"	20 March 1972	23
"Survival in the Sahara"	27 March 1972	24
"Mind over Body"	10 April 1972	25
"Out of Volcanoes"	17 April 1972	26
"The Wizard Who Spat on the Floor"	1 May 1972	27
"Rail Crash"	8 May 1972	28
"Do You Dig National Parks?"	22 May 1972	29
"The Rat Man, Sigmund Freud"	5 June 1972	30
"Sorry I Opened My Mouth"	12 June 1972	31
"The Ways We Move"	3 July 1972	32
"The Life That Lives on Man"	10 July 1972	33
"Sex Can Be a Problem"	24 July 1972	34
"The Surgery of Violence"	31 July 1972	35

== Series 9: 1972–1973 ==
Title	Original broadcast date	Episode
"Hospital, Episode 1922"	12 October 1972	1
"When Polar Bears Swam in the Thames"	19 October 1972	2
"Making of an English Landscape"	26 October 1972	3
"Shadows of Bliss"	2 November 1972	4
"Billion Marsh"	9 November 1972	5
"Do You Sincerely Want a Long Life?"	16 November 1972	6
"The Making of a Natural History Film"	23 November 1972	7
"Fire"	30 November 1972	8
"Alaskan Pipe Dream"	7 December 1972	9
"Their Life in Your Hands"	21 December 1972	10
"Navigating Europe"	28 December 1972	11
"Epidemic"	4 January 1973	12
"Worlds in Collision"	11 January 1973	13
"The Military Necessity"	18 January 1973	14
"The Curtain of Silence"	25 January 1973	15
"When the Breeding Has to Stop"	8 February 1973	16
"Science Is Dead, Long Live Science"	15 February 1973	17
"And Where Will the Children Play?"	1 March 1973	18
"Acupuncture"	8 March 1973	19
"What Time Is Your Body?"	22 March 1973	20
"Survival of the Weakest"	5 April 1973	21
"Red Sea Coral and the Crown of Thorns"	12 April 1973	22
"Lumbered... With Back-Ache!"	26 April 1973	23
"Airport"	3 May 1973	24
"Do You Remember the Memory Man?"	17 May 1973	25
"What a Waste!"	24 May 1973	26
"The Laws of the Land"	7 June 1973	27
"Do We Really Need the Railways?"	14 June 1973	28
"The Telly of Tomorrow"	21 June 1973	29
"How Does It Hurt?"	5 July 1973	30
"A Scientist Looks at Religion"	9 August 1973	31

== Series 10: 1973–1974 ==
Title	Original broadcast date	Episode
"In Search of Konrad Lorenz"	24 September 1973	1
"Stretch Up Tall"	1 October 1973	2
"Gilding the Lily"	8 October 1973	3
"Black Holes of Gravity"	15 October 1973	4
"What's so Big About Us?"	22 October 1973	5
"The Steadfast Tin Soldier"	29 October 1973	6
"Carry On Smoking"	5 November 1973	7
"Air Crash Detective"	26 November 1973	8
"An Element of Mystery"	3 December 1973	9
"Digging Up the Future"	17 December 1973	10
"Kula, A Reason for Giving"	24 December 1973	11
"Crime Lab"	31 December 1973	12
"A Matter of Self Defence"	7 January 1974	13
"Bird Brain, The Mystery of Bird Navigation"	14 January 1974	14
"Never Too Late to Learn"	21 January 1974	15
"The Great Fish Hunt"	28 January 1974	16
"Pedal Power"	4 February 1974	17
"The Writing on the Wall"	11 February 1974	18
"Where Did the Colorado Go?"	25 February 1974	19
"The Future Goes Boom"	4 March 1974	20
"Fusion, The Energy Promise"	11 March 1974	21
"The First Ten Years"	22 April 1974	22
"This Yankee Dodge Beats Mesmerism Hollow"	29 April 1974	23
"The Hunting of the Quark"	6 May 1974	24
"A Noah's Ark for Europe"	13 May 1974	25
"Bridges, When It Comes to the Crunch"	3 June 1974	26
"Search for Life"	10 June 1974	27
"The Secrets of Sleep"	17 June 1974	28
"Who Needs Skill?"	24 June 1974	29
"Hills of Promise"	1 July 1974	30
"The Race for the Double Helix"	8 July 1974	31
"The Immigrant Doctors"	15 July 1974	32
"Mines Minerals and Men"	22 July 1974	33
"What Price Steak?"	29 July 1974	34
"Listen and Be Loyal"	5 August 1974	35
"Adam or Eve?"	19 August 1974	36

== Series 11: 1974–1975 ==
Title	Original broadcast date	Episode
"An Unholy Scramble"	2 September 1974	1
"You Do as You Are Told"	28 October 1974	2
"The First Signs of Washoe"	4 November 1974	3
"The Other Way"	11 November 1974	4
"The Greatest Advance Since the Wheel"	25 November 1974	5
"Joey"	9 December 1974	6
"The Neglected Harvest"	16 December 1974	7
"How on Earth Did They Do That?"	23 December 1974	8
"The Lysenko Affair"	30 December 1974	9
"The Cleanest Place in the World"	6 January 1975	10
"The Killer Dust"	20 January 1975	11
"A Time to Be Born"	27 January 1975	12
"The Unsafe Sea"	10 February 1975	13
"The Change of Life"	17 February 1975	14
"Project Fido"	24 February 1975	15
"The Planets"	10 March 1975	16
"The Long Long Walkabout"	7 April 1975	17
"The Overworked Miracle"	14 April 1975	18
"Not the Cheapest but the Best"	21 April 1975	19
"A Spoonful of Roughage"	28 April 1975	20
"Brain Poison"	5 May 1975	21
"The Bulldog's Last Bark?"	12 May 1975	22
"Benjamin"	19 May 1975	23
"The Mcmaster Experiment"	2 June 1975	24
"The Glazed Outlook"	9 June 1975	25
"The Three Chord Trick"	16 June 1975	26
"Strange Sleep"	30 June 1975	27
"How Do You Read?"	14 July 1975	28
"The Sickly Sea"	21 July 1975	29
"Happy Catastrophe"	28 July 1975	30
"To Die to Live: The Survivors of Hiroshima"	6 August 1975	31
"Cannabis"	11 August 1975	32
"Meditation and the Mind"	18 August 1975	33

== Series 12: 1975–1976 ==
Title	Original broadcast date	Episode
"The Trobriand Experiment"	29 December 1975	1
"The Transplant Experience"	5 January 1976	2
"Intimate Strangers"	12 January 1976	3
"A Fair Share of What Little We Have"	19 January 1976	4
"The Incredible Machine"	26 January 1976	5
"King Coal Revived"	2 February 1976	6
"A Question of Trust"	9 February 1976	7
"The Case of the Bermuda Triangle"	16 February 1976	8
"The Lords of the Labyrinth"	23 February 1976	9
"Inside the Shark"	1 March 1976	10
"The Chemical Dream"	8 March 1976	11
"The Edelin Affair"	15 March 1976	12
"The World of Margaret Mead"	22 March 1976	13
"The Pathway from Madness"	29 March 1976	14
"Geronimo's Children"	5 April 1976	15
"The Vision of the Blind"	12 April 1976	16
"A Lesson for Teacher"	26 April 1976	17
"Why Did Stuart Die?"	3 May 1976	18
"The Children of Peru"	17 May 1976	19
"Dying"	24 May 1976	20
"The Great British Drought"	26 May 1976	—
"A Home Like Ours..., A Story of Four Children"	7 June 1976	21
"What's Wrong with the Sun?"	14 June 1976	22

== Series 13: 1976–1977 ==
Title	Original broadcast date	Episode
"The Bull's-Eye War"	25 October 1976	1
"The Hot-Blooded Dinosaurs"	1 November 1976	2
"Billion Dollar Bubble"	8 November 1976	3
"The Selfish Gene"	15 November 1976	4
"A Child of Our Own"	22 November 1976	5
"Secrets of a Coral Island"	29 November 1976	6
"The Long Valley"	6 December 1976	7
"Half-Way to 1984"	13 December 1976	8
"The Mystery of King Arthur and His Round Table"	20 December 1976	9
"A Smile for the Crocodile"	7 January 1977	10
"The Pill for the People"	14 January 1977	11
"The Ape That Stood Up"	21 January 1977	12
"The Human Animal"	4 February 1977	13
"The Guinea Pig and the Law"	18 February 1977	14
"Hunters of the Seal"	25 February 1977	15
"The Red Planet"	4 March 1977	16
"One of Nature's Hotels"	11 March 1977	17
"Dawn of the Solar Age"	18 March 1977	18
"Genetic Roulette"	1 April 1977	19
"The Amazing Doctor Newton"	15 July 1977	20
"The Trouble with Medicine"	22 July 1977	21
"Silent Speech"	29 July 1977	22
"The Green Machine"	5 August 1977	23
"Horizon 2002"	26 August 1977	24

== Series 14: 1977–1978 ==
Title	Original broadcast date	Episode
"The River That Came Clean"	2 September 1977	1
"Blueprints in the Bloodstream"	9 September 1977	2
"40 Years of Murder"	16 September 1977	3
"Darwin's Dream"	23 September 1977	—
"The Cry for Help"	30 September 1977	4
"The Sunspot Mystery"	7 October 1977	5
"The Rhine's Revenge"	21 October 1977	6
"The Case of the Ancient Astronauts"	25 November 1977	—
"Icarus' Children"	2 December 1977	7
"The Healing Nightmare"	9 December 1977	8
"The Great Wine Revolution"	23 December 1977	9
"Living Machines"	6 January 1978	10
"A Land for All Reasons"	20 January 1978	11
"I Don't Want to Be a Burden"	27 January 1978	12
"Zero G"	3 February 1978	13
"Message in the Rocks"	17 February 1978	14
"The Eddystone Lights"	24 February 1978	15
"Laser: Light of the 21st Century"	10 March 1978	16
"The New Breadline"	24 March 1978	17
"Now the Chips are Down"	31 March 1978	18
"Explosions in the Mind"	14 July 1978	19
"One Small Step"	21 July 1978	20
"The Tsetse Trap"	28 July 1978	21
"A Whisper from Space"	4 August 1978	22
"Prisoners of Hope"	11 August 1978	23
"On a Different Track"	18 August 1978	24
"Careering into Science"	25 August 1978	25

== Series 15: 1978–1979 ==
Title	Original broadcast date	Episode
"Cashing In on the Ocean"	1 September 1978	1
"Bags of Life"	8 September 1978	2
"Innocent Slaughter?"	15 September 1978	3
"Beersheva Experiment"	3 November 1978	4
"Divers Do It Deeper"	10 November 1978	5
"The Big Sleep"	17 November 1978	6
"The Vital Spark"	24 November 1978	7
"The Red Deer of Rhum"	29 December 1978	8
"The Forever Fuel"	26 February 1979	9
"In Search of Pegasus"	5 March 1979	10
"The Keys of Paradise"	12 March 1979	11
"Sweet Solutions"	19 March 1979	12
"Bronze Age Blast-Off"	26 March 1979	13
"The Real Bionic Man"	2 April 1979	14
"A Mediterranean Prospect"	9 April 1979	15
"Elements of Risk"	23 April 1979	16
"Mr Ludwig's Tropical Dreamland"	30 April 1979	17
"Where Nothing Happens Twice"	7 May 1979	18
"Journey Through the Human Body"	14 May 1979	19
"The Fight to Be Male"	21 May 1979	20
"The Robots Are Coming"	28 May 1979	21

== Series 16: 1979–1980 ==
Title	Original broadcast date	Episode
"The Mexican Oil Dance"	24 September 1979	1
"Tracks on the Oregon Trail"	1 October 1979	2
"The Race to Re-Shape Cars"	8 October 1979	3
"Dragnet for Diabetes"	15 October 1979	4
"Lost Waters of the Nile"	22 October 1979	5
"Survival of the Fastest"	29 October 1979	6
"A Touch of Sensitivity"	5 November 1979	7
"A Treasury of Trees"	12 November 1979	8
"Darkness Visible"	19 November 1979	9
"Uranium Goes Critical"	3 December 1979	10
"The Fat in the Fire"	10 December 1979	11
"Decade"	17 December 1979	12
"Ghost of the Amoco Cadiz"	14 January 1980	13
"You Are Old, Father William"	21 January 1980	14
"The Mind's Eye"	28 January 1980	—
"Cleared for Take Off"	4 February 1980	15
"A Sporting Chance"	11 February 1980	16
"The Cancer Detectives of Lin Xian"	18 February 1980	17
"The Big If"	25 February 1980	18
"Cash from Trash"	3 March 1980	19
"Encounter with Jupiter"	10 March 1980	20
"Portrait of a Poison"	17 March 1980	21
"Magnet Earth"	24 March 1980	22

== Series 17: 1980–1981 ==
Title	Original broadcast date	Episode
"Goodbye Gutenberg"	1 September 1980	1
"Invasion of the Virions"	8 September 1980	2
"Beyond the Milky Way"	15 September 1980	3
"Little Boxes"	22 September 1980	4
"The Other Kenya"	29 September 1980	5
"Moving Still"	6 October 1980	6
"The Way Out"	13 October 1980	7
"The Dead Sea Lives"	20 October 1980	8
"Once in a Million Years"	27 October 1980	9
"Smokers' Luck"	3 November 1980	10
"Behind the Horoscope"	10 November 1980	11
"The Mondragon Experiment"	17 November 1980	12
"The Spike"	24 November 1980	13
"The Slatemakers"	1 December 1980	14
"Anatomy of a Volcano"	15 December 1980	15
"Spend and Prosper"	5 January 1981	16
"A Whole New Medicine"	12 January 1981	17
"The Qualyub Project"	19 January 1981	18
"No One Will Take Me Seriously"	26 January 1981	19
"Living with Dying"	2 February 1981	20
"A Is for Atom, B Is for Bomb"	9 February 1981	21
"Who Will Deliver Your Baby?"	16 February 1981	22
"West of Bangalore"	2 March 1981	23
"Gentlemen, Lift Your Skirts"	9 March 1981	24
"Hello Universe!"	16 March 1981	25
"Voices from Silent Hands"	23 March 1981	26
"Did Darwin Get It Wrong?"	30 March 1981	27
"East of Bombay"	6 April 1981	28
"Resolution on Saturn, 1: The Rings"	11 April 1981	29
"Resolution on Saturn, 2: The Moons"	13 April 1981	30

== Series 18: 1981–1982 ==
Title	Original broadcast date	Episode
"Heads I Win, Tails You Lose"	28 September 1981	1
"The Hunt for the Legion Killer"	5 October 1981	2
"Breaking in Children"	12 October 1981	3
"The Grid"	19 October 1981	4
"Butterflies or Barley?"	26 October 1981	5
"Science for the People"	2 November 1981	6
"The Race to Ruin"	9 November 1981	7
"Death of the Dinosaurs"	16 November 1981	8
"The Pleasure of Finding Things Out"	23 November 1981	9
"The Cornucopia"	30 November 1981	10
"A Race Against Time"	7 December 1981	11
"Painting by Numbers"	21 December 1981	12
"The Secret of the Snake"	11 January 1982	13
"Finding a Voice"	18 January 1982	14
"The Sea Behind the Dunes"	25 January 1982	15
"Whatever Happened to the Energy Crisis?"	1 February 1982	16
"Notes of a Biology Watcher"	8 February 1982	17
"The Cline Affair"	15 February 1982	18
"The Million Murdering Death"	22 February 1982	19
"Shots in the Dark"	1 March 1982	20
"The Victims"	8 March 1982	21
"The Future-Made in Japan?"	15 March 1982	22
"The Private Face of Medicine"	22 March 1982	23
"The Fatal Bargain"	5 April 1982	24

== Series 19: 1982–1983 ==
Title	Original broadcast date	Episode
"The Miracle of Life"	11 October 1982	1
"The Case of the UFOs"	18 October 1982	2
"A Killing Rain"	25 October 1982	3
"Intimate Relations"	1 November 1982	4
"The Scientist and the Baby"	8 November 1982	5
"Brave New Babies?"	15 November 1982	6
"The Professor of Surgery"	29 November 1982	7
"The Chopper"	6 December 1982	8
"The State of the Planet"	13 December 1982	9
"The Mysterious Mr Tesla"	20 December 1982	10
"25 Years in Space"	25 December 1982	—
"Sizewell Under Pressure"	10 January 1983	11
"Tropical Time Machine"	17 January 1983	12
"The Geneva Event"	24 January 1983	13
"How Much Can You Drink?"	7 February 1983	14
"Talking Turtle"	14 February 1983	15
"What Little Girls Are Made Of"	21 February 1983	16
"British Science – On the Wrong Track?"	28 February 1983	17
"The Great Plains Massacre"	7 March 1983	18
"Hard Rock"	14 March 1983	19
"Better Mind the Computer"	21 March 1983	20
"Madness on Trial"	11 April 1983	21
"Sixty Minutes to Meltdown"	18 April 1983	22
"Killer in the Village"	25 April 1983	23

== Series 20: 1983–1984 ==
Title	Original broadcast date	Episode
"The Case of E.S.P."	26 September 1983	1
"The Artificial Heart"	3 October 1983	2
"Dr Priestley and the Breath of Life"	10 October 1983	3
"Professor Hawking's Universe"	17 October 1983	4
"The Cruel Choice"	24 October 1983	5
"A Child's Guide to Languages"	31 October 1983	6
"China's Child"	7 November 1983	7
"The Earthquake Connection"	14 November 1983	8
"Prisoner or Patient?"	28 November 1983	9
"Cancer, The Pattern in the Genes"	5 December 1983	10
"The Academy"	12 December 1983	11
"The Intelligence Man"	9 January 1984	12
"Microworld"	16 January 1984	13
"A New Green Revolution?"	23 January 1984	14
"Spies in the Wires"	30 January 1984	15
"Valley of the Inca"	13 February 1984	16
Is about the Cusichaca Village, the inhabitants and the archeologist Ann Kendall. Ann has here been doing archeology and helping the villagers, with arranging a local health volunteer, and help the villagers to repair a irrigation canal from the inca time. The irrigation canal is to help the villagers to increase the food production there.
"Conquest of the Parasites"	27 February 1984	17
"Reflections on a River"	5 March 1984	18
"A Normal Face"	12 March 1984	19
"Prisoners of Incest"	19 March 1984	20
"Signs of the Apes, Songs of the Whales"	26 March 1984	21
"Professor Bonner and the Slime Moulds"	9 April 1984	22
"The Mind of a Murderer, 1: The Case of the Hillside Strangler"	16 April 1984	23
"The Mind of a Murderer, 2: The Mask of Madness"	17 April 1984	24
"A Cruel Inheritance"	30 April 1984	25
"The Malvern Link"	7 May 1984	26
"Biology at War: The Mystery of Yellow Rain"	15 May 1984	—
"Beyond the Moon"	21 July 1984	—

== Series 21: 1984–1985 ==
Title	Original broadcast date	Episode
"Biology at War: A Plague in the Wind"	29 October 1984	—
"Contented Cows and Other Animals"	5 November 1984	1
"Picking Winners"	12 November 1984	2
"The Brain Puzzle"	19 November 1984	3
"Global Village"	26 November 1984	4
"Ivan"	3 December 1984	5
"A Mathematical Mystery Tour"	10 December 1984	6
"Supercharged, The Grand Prix Car (1924–1939)"	17 December 1984	7
"Colourful Notions"	7 January 1985	8
"A World of Their Own"	14 January 1985	9
"Decoding Danebury"	21 January 1985	10
"A Mission to Heal"	28 January 1985	11
"Mystery of the Left Hand"	4 February 1985	12
"The Theatre of War"	11 February 1985	13
"The Careful Predator"	25 February 1985	14
"What Einstein Never Knew"	4 March 1985	15
"Eurekaaargh!"	11 March 1985	16
"Careering On"	18 March 1985	17
"How to Film the Impossible"	25 March 1985	18
"The Food Allergy War"	1 April 1985	19
"Goddess Of The Earth"	15 April 1985	20
"Iras, The Supercooled Eye"	22 April 1985	21
"A Prize Discovery"	29 April 1985	22
"Twenty-First Birthday"	20 May 1985	23

== Series 22: 1985–1986 ==
Title	Original broadcast date	Episode
"Halley's Comet: The Apparition"	25 November 1985	—
"Are You a Racist?"	6 January 1986	1
"Genesis"	13 January 1986	2
"Bitter Cold"	20 January 1986	3
"The Mould, the Myth and the Microbe"	27 January 1986	4
"Outbreak, The Microbe Masters the Mould"	3 February 1986	5
"The Wrong Stuff"	10 February 1986	6
"Science... Fiction?"	17 February 1986	7
"The Children of Eve"	24 February 1986	8
"The New Face of Leprosy"	3 March 1986	9
"Hi-Tech a la Française"	10 March 1986	10
"In the Wake of HMS Sheffield"	17 March 1986	11
"AIDS, A Strange and Deadly Virus"	24 March 1986	12
"The Case of the Frozen Addict"	7 April 1986	13
"Nice Guys Finish First"	14 April 1986	14
"The Men Who Bottled a Cow"	21 April 1986	15
"Twice Five plus the Wings of a Bird"	28 April 1986	16
"What Makes an Animal Smart?"	12 May 1986	17
"A Handful of Sugar with a Pinch of Salt"	19 May 1986	18
"Uranus Encounter"	26 May 1986	19
"Who Built Stonehenge?"	9 June 1986	20
"Battered Baby, 1: From Generation to Generation"	16 June 1986	21
"Battered Baby, 2: Breaking the Chain"	23 June 1986	22
"Doctors to Be"	30 June 1986	23

== Series 23: 1987 ==
Title	Original broadcast date	Episode
"The Twenty-Five Hour Clock"	5 January 1987	1
"The Search for the Disappeared"	12 January 1987	2
"The Blind Watchmaker"	19 January 1987	3
"Riding the Stack"	26 January 1987	4
"Bruno Bettelheim, 1: The Man Who Cared for Children"	2 February 1987	5
"Bruno Bettelheim, 2: A Sense of Surviving"	9 February 1987	6
"Energy from Outer Space"	16 February 1987	7
"The Return of the Osprey"	23 February 1987	8
"Can AIDS Be Stopped?"	2 March 1987	9
"Police Stress, John Wayne Syndrome"	9 March 1987	10
"To Engineer Is Human"	16 March 1987	11
"The Magma Chamber"	23 March 1987	12
"Broken Images"	30 March 1987	13
"Trial Babies"	6 April 1987	14
"After Chernobyl, Closer to Home"	13 April 1987	15
"Life Story"	27 April 1987	—
"Making Sex Pay"	11 May 1987	16
"The Anthropic Principle"	18 May 1987	17
"Aircrash, The Burning Issue"	1 June 1987	18
"Riddle of the Joints"	8 June 1987	19
"To Catch a Falling Star"	15 June 1987	20
"In the Light of New Information"	22 June 1987	21
"Janice's Choice"	29 June 1987	22

== Series 24: 1988 ==
Title	Original broadcast date	Episode
"The Transplanted Brain"	4 January 1988	1
"Death of a Star"	11 January 1988	2
"Playing with Madness"	18 January 1988	3
"The Canal in the Jungle"	25 January 1988	4
"Death of the Working Classes"	1 February 1988	5
"The Greenhouse Effect"	8 February 1988	6
"Struggling for Control"	15 February 1988	7
"Thinking"	22 February 1988	8
"Patients on Trial"	29 February 1988	9
"Purple Warrior, Rules of Engagement"	7 March 1988	10
"Purple Warrior, Limited War"	14 March 1988	11
"The Heart of Another"	28 March 1988	12
"Easter Island, The Secrets"	11 April 1988	13
"Easter Island, The Story"	18 April 1988	14
"Doctors to Be, 1: Trial by Interview"	23 April 1988	—
"Doctors to Be, 2: The Knowledge"	24 April 1988	—
"Doctors to Be, 3: Welcome to the Real World"	25 April 1988	—
"Cancer at Bay"	4 May 1988	15
"Traces of Murder"	9 May 1988	16
"The Hope of Progress"	16 May 1988	17
"A Newsday Revolution"	23 May 1988	18
"A Good Test?"	6 June 1988	19
"Superconductor, The Race for the Prize"	13 June 1988	20
"Believe Me"	27 June 1988	21
"The Quest for Tannu Tuva"	4 July 1988	—

== Series 25: 1988–1989 ==
Title	Original broadcast date	Episode
"The Diary of Discovery"	28 September 1988	1
"The Book of Man"	9 January 1989	2
"The Poison That Waits"	16 January 1989	3
"Perils of the Deep"	23 January 1989	4
"Smart Weapons"	30 January 1989	5
"Wasting the Alps"	6 February 1989	6
"In the Last Resort"	13 February 1989	7
"Gaze in Wonder"	20 February 1989	8
"In My Lifetime?"	27 February 1989	9
"Concerto"	6 March 1989	10
"Black Schizophrenia"	13 March 1989	11
"Trial in the Jungle"	20 March 1989	12
"Who Will Make Me Better?"	3 April 1989	13
"A Wonderful Life"	17 April 1989	14
"Why Buildings Make You Sick"	24 April 1989	15
"Jubilee"	8 May 1989	16
"Crash"	15 May 1989	17
"The New Sixth Sense"	22 May 1989	18
"Clive Sinclair, The Anatomy of an Inventor"	12 June 1989	19
"Newpin, A Lifeline"	19 June 1989	20
"Time of Darkness"	26 June 1989	21

== Series 26: 1990 ==
Title	Original broadcast date	Episode
"Oil Spill"	8 January 1990	1
"Medicine 2000"	15 January 1990	2
"Food Irradiation: Would You Buy It?"	22 January 1990	3
"From Earth to Miranda"	29 January 1990	4
"Encounter with Neptune"	5 February 1990	5
"Guess What's Coming to Dinner"	12 February 1990	6
"The First 14 Days"	19 February 1990	7
"The 10,000 Year Test"	5 March 1990	8
"Hurricane!"	12 March 1990	9
"The Britannic Greenhouse"	19 March 1990	10
"Cold Fusion: Too Close to the Sun"	26 March 1990	11
"The Quake of 89: The Final Warning?"	2 April 1990	12
"The Sharpest Show of the Universe"	9 April 1990	13
"The Company of Ants and Bees"	23 April 1990	14
"The Intelligent Island"	30 April 1990	15
"Legacy of a Volcano"	14 May 1990	16
"Do Cows Make You Mad?"	21 May 1990	17
"The Child Mothers"	4 June 1990	18
"Making an Honest Fiver"	6 June 1990	—
"Signs of Life"	11 June 1990	19
"AIDS: A Quest for a Cure"	25 June 1990	20

== Series 27: 1990–1991 ==
Title	Original broadcast date	Episode
"Red Star in Orbit, 1: The Invisible Spaceman"	7 December 1990	—
"Red Star in Orbit, 2: The Dark Side of the Moon"	14 December 1990	—
"Red Star in Orbit, 3: The Mission"	21 December 1990	—
"Sudden Death"	7 January 1991	1
"Keen as Mustard"	14 January 1991	2
"Smokers Can Harm Your Health"	21 January 1991	3
"Coming in from the Cold"	28 January 1991	4
"Small Problem with the Mirror"	4 February 1991	5
"California Dreaming"	11 February 1991	6
"The Day the Earth Melted"	18 February 1991	7
"The Curse of Karash"	25 February 1991	8
"Playing at Noah"	4 March 1991	9
"Cashing in on Paradise"	11 March 1991	10
"The Terracotta Time Machine"	18 March 1991	11
"Measuring the Roof of the World"	25 March 1991	12
"The Mould, the Myth and the Microbe"	8 April 1991	13
"The First Americans"	15 April 1991	14
"Inside Chernobyl Sarcophagus"	22 April 1991	15
"Colonising Cyberspace"	29 April 1991	16
"Emerging Viruses"	13 May 1991	17
"Camelford, A Bitter Aftertaste"	20 May 1991	18
"Of Big Bangs, Stick Men and Galactic Holes"	3 June 1991	19
"Food for Thought"	10 June 1991	20
"The Long Road to the West"	17 June 1991	21
"Half Hearted About Semi-Skimmed"	24 June 1991	22
"T-Rex Exposed"	1 July 1991	23

== Series 28: 1992 ==
Title	Original broadcast date	Episode
"The Shadow of Breast Cancer"	6 January 1992	1
"Pest Wars"	13 January 1992	2
"Molecules with Sunglasses"	20 January 1992	3
"In Search of the Noble Savage"	27 January 1992	4
"Malaria, Battle of the Merozoites"	3 February 1992	5
"The Black Sun"	17 February 1992	6
"Hitler's Bomb"	24 February 1992	7
"An Expensive Theology"	2 March 1992	8
"The Strange Life and Death of Dr. Turing"	9 March 1992	9
"Hot Jam in the Doughnut"	16 March 1992	10
"Diet for a Lifetime"	30 March 1992	11
"Before Babel"	6 April 1992	12
"The Man Who Moved the Mountains"	13 April 1992	13
"Iceman"	27 April 1992	14
"Taking the Credit"	11 May 1992	15
"Fast Life in the Food Chain"	18 May 1992	16
"Dodging Doomsday"	1 June 1992	17
"A Question of Sport..."	8 June 1992	18
"Genes R Us"	15 June 1992	19
"A Close Encounter of the Second Kind"	10 July 1992	—
"Hide and Seek in Iraq"	23 August 1992	—

== Series 29: 1992–1993 ==
Title	Original broadcast date	Episode
"The Truth About Sex"	3 December 1992	—
"Awakening the Frozen Addicts"	4 January 1993	1
"Cheating Time"	11 January 1993	2
"TB, The Forgotten Plague"	18 January 1993	3
"No Ordinary Genius, Richard Feynman 1918-88, Part One"	25 January 1993	4
"No Ordinary Genius, Richard Feynman 1918-88, Part Two"	1 February 1993	5
"Mars Alive"	8 February 1993	6
"Suggers, Fruggers and Data-Muggers"	15 February 1993	7
"The Pyramid Builders"	22 February 1993	8
"Here Be Monsters"	1 March 1993	9
"Iceman"	8 March 1993	10
"Whatever Happened to Star Wars?"	15 March 1993	11
"Resurrecting the Dead Sea Scrolls"	22 March 1993	12
"Dante Goes to Hell"	29 March 1993	13
"Ghosts in the Dinosaur Graveyard"	5 April 1993	14
"The New Alchemists"	19 April 1993	15
"Allergic To The 20th Century"	10 May 1993	16
"Wot U Lookin At?"	24 May 1993	17
"The Electronic Frontier"	7 June 1993	18
"A Vital Poison"	14 June 1993	19
"Chimp Talk"	21 June 1993	20
"Life Is Impossible"	28 June 1993	21

== Series 30: 1993–1994 ==
Title	Original broadcast date	Episode
"Assault on the Male"	31 October 1993	—
"Small Arms, Soft Targets"	10 January 1994	1
"The Last Mammoth"	17 January 1994	2
"Gerald Edelman, The Man Who Made Up His Mind"	24 January 1994	3
"Genie, Secret of the Wild Child"	31 January 1994	4
"Death Wish, The Untold Story"	7 February 1994	5
"Air Crash, The Deadly Puzzle"	14 February 1994	6
"Hunt for the Doomsday Asteroid"	28 February 1994	7
"Hubble Vision"	7 March 1994	8
"Some Liked It Hot"	14 March 1994	9
"Too Close to the Sun"	21 March 1994	10
"Sir Walter's Journey"	28 March 1994	11
"After the Flood"	18 April 1994	12
"Against the Clock"	25 April 1994	13
"Auschwitz, The Blueprints of Genocide"	9 May 1994	14
"Ulcer Wars"	16 May 1994	15
"30th Anniversary, The Far Side"	23 May 1994	16

== Series 31: 1994–1995 ==
Title	Original broadcast date	Episode
"Deaf Whale, Dead Whale"	7 November 1994	1
"Whispers of Creation"	14 November 1994	2
"The Predator"	21 November 1994	3
"Close Encounters"	28 November 1994	4
"Orange Sherbert Kisses"	12 December 1994	5
"Designer Wines"	19 December 1994	6
"Tibet, The Ice Mother"	9 January 1995	7
"Russia's Deep Secrets"	16 January 1995	8
"Bones of Contention"	23 January 1995	9
"Siamese Twins"	30 January 1995	10
"Twice Born"	14 February 1995	—
"Too Big Too Soon?"	20 February 1995	11
"Farewell Fantastic Venus"	27 February 1995	12
"Exodus"	6 March 1995	13
"The Betrayers"	13 March 1995	14
"Icon Earth"	20 March 1995	15
"The I-Bomb"	27 March 1995	16
"Foetal Attraction"	3 April 1995	17
"Cracks in the Crust"	10 April 1995	18
"Hearing Voices"	24 April 1995	19

== Series 32: 1995–1996 ==
Title	Original broadcast date	Episode
"Liar"	30 October 1995	1
"The Human Laboratory"	6 November 1995	2
"Nanotopia"	13 November 1995	3
"Hunt for the Doomsday Asteroid"	20 November 1995	4
"A Code in the Nose"	27 November 1995	5
"AIDS, Behind Closed Doors"	4 December 1995	6
"The Runaway Mountain"	11 December 1995	7
"The Butchers of Boxgrove"	8 January 1996	8
"A Miracle for Cancer?"	22 January 1996	9
"Nature's Numbers"	29 January 1996	10
"The Gene Race"	5 February 1996	11
"Masters of the Ionosphere"	12 February 1996	12
"Assault on the Male (Revisited)"	26 February 1996	13
"Death by Design"	4 March 1996	14
"Planet Hunters"	11 March 1996	15
"Einstein, Miracle Year"	17 March 1996	16
"Einstein, Fame"	18 March 1996	17
"Inside Chernobyl Sarcophagus"	25 March 1996	18
"Fallout From Chernobyl"	1 April 1996	19

== Series 33: 1996–1997 ==
Title	Original broadcast date	Episode
"The Science of Star Trek"	26 August 1996	—
"Television Is Dead: Long Live TV"	2 November 1996	1
"Aliens from Mars"	11 November 1996	2
"The Invisible Enemy (BSE Special episode)"	17 November 1996	—
"The Human Experiment (BSE Special episode)"	18 November 1996	—
"Living Death"	25 November 1996	3
"The Time Lords"	2 December 1996	4
"Molecules with Sunglasses"	9 December 1996	5
"Noah's Flood"	16 December 1996	6
"Ice Mummies 1: The Ice Maiden"	30 January 1997	—
"Ice Mummies 2: A Life in Ice"	6 February 1997	—
"Ice Mummies 3: Frozen in Heaven"	13 February 1997	—
"Siamese Twins"	20 February 1997	7
"Psychedelic Science"	27 February 1997	8
"Fat Cats, Thin Mice"	6 March 1997	9
"Shipwreck"	13 March 1997	10
"Genius of the Jet"	20 March 1997	11
"Smallpox on Death Row"	27 March 1997	12
"Silent Children, New Language"	3 April 1997	13
"Turned on by Danger"	17 April 1997	14
"A Perfect Oil Spill"	24 April 1997	15
"The Great Balloon Race"	1 May 1997	16

== Series 34: 1997–1998 ==
Title	Original broadcast date	Episode
"Destination Mars"	4 July 1997	—
"Mars, Death or Glory?"	5 July 1997	—
"Crater of Death"	11 September 1997	1
"Mind over Body"	18 September 1997	2
"Out of Asia"	25 September 1997	3
"Fermat's Last Theorem"	2 October 1997	4
"The Virus That Cures"	9 October 1997	5
"The Man Who Lost His Body"	16 October 1997	6
"Dawn of the Clone Age"	23 October 1997	7
"The Ice Forms (Antarctica Special Edition Part 1)"	30 October 1997	—
"The Ice Lives (Antarctica Special Edition Part 2)"	6 November 1997	—
"The Ice Melts (Antarctica Special Edition Part 3)"	13 November 1997	—
"Crash"	8 January 1998	8
"Saddam's Secrets"	19 February 1998	9
"Dr Miller and the Islanders"	26 February 1998	10
"The Rainmaker"	5 March 1998	11
"Hopeful Monsters"	19 March 1998	12
"Premature Babies, The Limits to Birth"	26 March 1998	13
"Darwin, The Legacy"	29 March 1998	—
"Overkill"	2 April 1998	14
"The Curse of Vesuvius"	16 April 1998	15
"Mir Mortals"	23 April 1998	16
"The Computer That Ate Hollywood"	30 April 1998	17
"Magic Bullet"	7 May 1998	18
"The Gulf War Jigsaw"	14 May 1998	19

== Series 35: 1998–1999 ==
Title	Original broadcast date	Episode
"Sexual Chemistry"	10 September 1998	1
"Chimps on Death Row"	1 October 1998	2
"Dinosaurs in Your Garden"	8 October 1998	3
"Mosquito!"	15 October 1998	4
"The Life and Times of Life and Time"	22 October 1998	5
"Thalidomide, A Necessary Evil"	29 October 1998	6
"Beyond a Joke"	5 November 1998	7
"Longitude"	4 January 1999	—
"Born to Be Fat (Fat Files Special Edition Part 1)"	7 January 1999	—
"Fixing Fat (Fat Files Special Edition Part 2)"	14 January 1999	—
"Living on Air (Fat Files Special Edition Part 3)"	21 January 1999	—
"From Here to Infinity"	28 January 1999	8
"Pandemic"	4 February 1999	9
"Elephants or Ivory"	11 February 1999	10
"Electric Heart"	18 February 1999	11
"Sudden Death"	25 February 1999	12
"New Star in Orbit"	11 March 1999	13
"New Asteroid Danger"	18 March 1999	14
"Skeleton Key"	25 March 1999	15
"Designer Babies"	7 April 1999	16
"Wings of Angels"	1 August 1999	17

== Series 36: 1999–2000 ==
Title	Original broadcast date	Episode
"Atlantis Uncovered (Atlantis Special Edition Part 1)"	28 October 1999	—
"Atlantis Reborn (Atlantis Special Edition Part 2)"	4 November 1999	—
"Mistaken Identity"	11 November 1999	1
"Volcanoes of the Deep"	18 November 1999	2
"Anatomy of an Avalanche"	25 November 1999	3
"The Midas Formula"	2 December 1999	4
"Living Forever (Life and Death in the 21st Century Special Edition Part 1)"	4 January 2000	—
"Future Plagues (Life and Death in the 21st Century Special Edition Part 2)"	5 January 2000	—
"Designer Babies (Life and Death in the 21st Century Special Edition Part 3)"	6 January 2000	—
"Breath of Life"	13 January 2000	5
"Lost City of the Nasca"	20 January 2000	6
"The Diamond Makers"	27 January 2000	7
"Supervolcanos"	3 February 2000	8
"Miracle in Orbit"	10 February 2000	9
"Complete Obsession: Body Dysmorphia"	17 February 2000	10
"Is GM Safe?"	9 March 2000	11
"Planet Hunters"	16 March 2000	12
"Constant Craving: The Science of Addiction"	30 March 2000	13
"Moon Children"	4 April 2000	14

== Series 37: 2000–2001 ==
Title	Original broadcast date	Episode
"Mega-Tsunami, Wave of Destruction"	12 October 2000	1
"Conjoined Twins"	19 October 2000	2
"The Lost World of Lake Vostok"	26 October 2000	3
"Vanished, The Plane That Disappeared"	2 November 2000	4
"The Secret Treasures of Zeugma"	9 November 2000	5
"The Valley of Life or Death"	16 November 2000	6
"Extreme Dinosaurs"	23 November 2000	7
"Supermassive Black Holes"	30 November 2000	8
"The Boy Who Was Turned into a Girl"	7 December 2000	9
"Atlantis Reborn Again"	14 December 2000	10
"Life on Mars (Mars Special Episode Part 1)"	11 January 2001	—
"Destination Mars (Mars Special Episode Part 2)"	18 January 2001	—
"The Mystery of the Miami Circle"	25 January 2001	11
"The Missing Link"	1 February 2001	12
"Killer Algae"	8 February 2001	13
"Ecstasy and Agony"	15 February 2001	14
"Snowball Earth"	22 February 2001	15
Horizon investigates a theory that for millions of years the Earth was entirely smothered in ice, stretching from the poles to the tropics.
"Taming the Problem Child"	8 March 2001	16
Two disruptive children are followed through a controversial treatment regime.

== Series 38: 2001–2002 ==
Title	Original broadcast date	Episode
"What Sank the Kursk?"	8 August 2001	—
"The Mystery of the Persian Mummy"	20 September 2001	1
"The Ape That Took Over the World"	4 October 2001	2
"Life Blood"	11 October 2001	3
"The Death Star"	18 October 2001	4
"Cloning the First Human"	25 October 2001	5
"Helike, The Real Atlantis"	10 January 2002	6
"Volcano Hell"	17 January 2002	7
"Fatbusters"	24 January 2002	8
"The Lost Pyramids of Caral"	31 January 2002	9
"Death of the Iceman"	7 February 2002	10
"Parallel Universes"	14 February 2002	11
"The Dinosaur That Fooled the World"	21 February 2002	12
"The Fall of the World Trade Center"	7 March 2002	13
"Archimedes' Secret"	14 March 2002	14
"The Mystery of the Jurassic"	28 March 2002	15
"Killer Lakes"	4 April 2002	16
"The A6 Murder"	16 May 2002	17
"The England Patient"	23 May 2002	18

== Series 39: 2002–2003 ==
Horizon Revisited was broadcast on BBC Four and shown between 2002 and 2003. Each of the seven episodes takes information and clips from previous edition of Horizon and updates them with current thinking on each of the topics at hand. These are similar in format to the current 'Horizon Guide' special episodes.

Title	Original broadcast date	Episode
"Horizon Revisited, A Tale of Two Feathers"	18 October 2002	—
"Horizon Revisited, Mega Tsunami: Coming to a Beach near You"	25 October 2002	—
"Freak Wave"	14 November 2002	1
"Stone Age Columbus"	21 November 2002	2
"Homeopathy, The Test"	26 November 2002	3
"Horizon Revisited, Back to the Dark Ages"	29 November 2002	—
"The Day the Earth Nearly Died"	5 December 2002	4
"Horizon Revisited, Dawn of the Dinosaurs"	6 December 2002	—
"The Secret of El Dorado"	19 December 2002	5
"The Mystery of Easter Island"	9 January 2003	6
"Living Nightmare"	16 January 2003	7
"Averting Armageddon"	23 January 2003	8
"Dirty Bomb"	30 January 2003	9
"Sexual Chemistry"	13 February 2003	10
"The Day We Learned to Think"	20 February 2003	11
"Trial and Error"	27 February 2003	12
"Horizon Revisited, You Do as You Are Told: Jonathan Miller and the Milgram Experiment"	27 February 2003	—
"Earthquake Storms"	6 March 2003	13
"Horizon Revisited, The Human Genome Project"	6 March 2003	—
"Horizon Revisited, Michael Adler on AIDS"	13 March 2003	—
"Life on Mars"	27 March 2003	14
"The Secret Life of Caves"	3 April 2003	15
"God on the Brain"	17 April 2003	16
"Flight 587"	8 May 2003	17
"SARS, The True Story"	29 May 2003	18

== Series 40: 2003–2004 ==
Title	Original broadcast date	Episode
"The Big Chill"	13 November 2003	1
"The Bible Code"	20 November 2003	2
"Last Flight of the Columbia"	27 November 2003	3
"The Hunt for the AIDS Vaccine"	4 December 2003	4
"Percy Pilcher's Flying Machine"	11 December 2003	5
"Time Trip"	18 December 2003	6
"The Demonic Ape"	8 January 2004	7
"The Moscow Theatre Siege"	15 January 2004	8
"The Atkins Diet"	22 January 2004	9
"Secrets of the Star Disc"	29 January 2004	10
"The Dark Secret of Hendrik Schön"	5 February 2004	11
"Thalidomide, a Second Chance?"	12 February 2004	12
"The Diamond Labs"	4 March 2004	13
"T. Rex, Warrior or Wimp?"	11 March 2004	14
"Project Poltergeist"	18 March 2004	15
"The Truth of Troy"	25 March 2004	16

== Series 41: 2004–2005 ==
Title	Original broadcast date	Episode
"First Olympian"	23 July 2004	—
"The Truth About Vitamins"	16 September 2004	1
"King Solomon's Tablet of Stone"	23 September 2004	2
"Derek Tastes of Earwax"	30 September 2004	3
"What Really Killed the Dinosaurs?"	7 October 2004	4
"Making Millions the Easy Way"	14 October 2004	5
"Saturn, Lord of the Rings"	21 October 2004	6
"The Hunt for the Supertwister"	28 October 2004	7
"Dr. Money and the Boy with No Penis"	4 November 2004	8
"Global Dimming"	13 January 2005	9
"Einstein's Unfinished Symphony"	20 January 2005	10
"Einstein's Equation of Life and Death"	27 January 2005	11
"Living with ADHD"	3 February 2005	12
"Neanderthal"	10 February 2005	13
"An Experiment to Save the World"	17 February 2005	14
"Who's Afraid of 'Designer' Babies?"	24 February 2005	15
"The Lost Civilisation of Peru"	3 March 2005	16
"The Next Megaquake"	22 May 2005	17
"Does the MMR Jab Cause Autism?"	29 May 2005	18
"Malaria, Defeating the Curse"	5 June 2005	19

== Series 42: 2005–2006 ==
Title	Original broadcast date	Episode
"Tsunami, Naming the Dead"	8 September 2005	1
"The Hawking Paradox"	15 September 2005	2
"The Mystery of the Human Hobbit"	22 September 2005	3
"The Doctor Who Makes People Walk Again?"	29 September 2005	4
"Could Fish Make My Child Smart?"	6 October 2005	5
"Madagascar, A Treetop Odyssey"	13 October 2005	6
"Titan, A Place Like Home?"	20 October 2005	7
"The 7/7 Bombers, A Psychological Investigation"	27 October 2005	8
"The Ghost in Your Genes"	3 November 2005	9
"The Life and Times of El Niño"	3 January 2006	10
"Space Tourists"	12 January 2006	11
"Waiting for a Heartbeat"	19 January 2006	12
"A War on Science"	26 January 2006	13
"The Lost City of New Orleans"	2 February 2006	14
"Most of Our Universe Is Missing"	9 February 2006	15
"Winning Gold in 2012"	18 March 2006	—
"The Woman Who Thinks Like a Cow"	8 June 2006	16
"The Genius Sperm Bank"	15 June 2006	17
"Bye Bye, Planet Pluto"	22 June 2006	18
"We Love Cigarettes"	29 June 2006	19
"Nuclear Nightmares"	13 July 2006	20
"Tutankhamun's Fireball"	20 July 2006	21

== Series 43: 2006–2007 ==
Title	Original broadcast date	Episode
"Survivors' Guide to Plane Crashes"	3 October 2006	1
"Chimps Are People Too"	10 October 2006	2
"The World's First Face Transplant"	17 October 2006	3
"Human Version 2.0"	24 October 2006	4
"The Great Robot Race"	31 October 2006	5
"Pandemic"	7 November 2006	6
"We Are the Aliens"	14 November 2006	7
"My Pet Dinosaur"	13 March 2007	8
"The Elephant's Guide to Sex"	20 March 2007	9
"Prof Regan's Beauty Parlour"	27 March 2007	10
"Mad but Glad"	3 April 2007	11
"Moon for Sale"	10 April 2007	12
"Battle of the Brains"	17 April 2007	13
"Skyscraper Fire Fighters"	24 April 2007	14
"The Six Billion Dollar Experiment"	1 May 2007	15
"How to Commit the Perfect Murder"	8 May 2007	16
"Professor Regan's Supermarket Secrets"	31 May 2007	17

== Series 44: 2007–2008 ==
Title	Original broadcast date	Episode
"Everest: Doctors in the Death Zone Part 1"	23 September 2007	—
"Everest: Doctors in the Death Zone Part 2"	30 September 2007	—
"How to Kill a Human Being"	15 January 2008	1
"Total Isolation"	22 January 2008	2
"What on Earth Is Wrong with Gravity? "	29 January 2008	3
"Is Alcohol Worse than Ecstasy?"	5 February 2008	4
"How to Make Better Decisions"	12 February 2008	5
"How to Live to be 101"	19 February 2008	6
"Are We Alone in the Universe?"	4 March 2008	7
"How Much Is Your Dead Body Worth?"	18 March 2008	8
"How Does Your Memory Work?"	25 March 2008	9

== Series 45: 2008–2009 ==
Title	Original broadcast date	Episode
"The President's Guide to Science"	16 September 2008	1
"How Mad Are You? Part 1"	11 November 2008	2
"How Mad Are You? Part 2"	18 November 2008	3
"Jimmy's GM Food Fight"	25 November 2008	4
"Do You Know What Time It Is?"	2 December 2008	5
"Allergy Planet"	9 December 2008	6
"Where's My Robot?"	16 December 2008	7
"Why Are Thin People Not Fat?"	26 January 2009	8
"Cannabis: The Evil Weed?"	3 February 2009	9
"Why Do We Dream?"	10 February 2009	10
"Can We Make a Star on Earth?"	17 February 2009	11
"The Secret Life of Your Body Clock"	24 February 2009	12
"What's the Problem with Nudity?"	3 March 2009	13
"How to Survive a Disaster"	10 March 2009	14
"Who Do You Want Your Child to Be?"	17 March 2009	15
"Why Can't We Predict Earthquakes?"	24 March 2009	16
"Alan and Marcus Go Forth and Multiply"	31 March 2009	17
"How Violent Are You?"	12 May 2009	18

== Series 46: 2009–2010 ==
Title	Original broadcast date	Episode
"40 Years on the Moon"	9 July 2009	—
"Pandemic: A Horizon Guide"	9 August 2009	—
"Do I Drink Too Much?"	13 October 2009	1
"The Secret You"	20 October 2009	2
"Fix Me"	27 October 2009	3
"Who's Afraid of a Big Black Hole?"	3 November 2009	4
"Why Do We Talk?"	10 November 2009	5
"Mars: A Horizon Guide"	15 November 2009	—
"How Long Is a Piece of String?"	17 November 2009	6
"How Many People Can Live on Planet Earth?"	9 December 2009	7
"The Secret Life of the Dog"	6 January 2010	8
"Diet: A Horizon Guide"	7 January 2010	—
"Why Do Viruses Kill?"	13 January 2010	9
"Pill Poppers"	20 January 2010	10
"Don't Grow Old"	3 February 2010	11
"To Infinity and Beyond..."	10 February 2010	12
"What Makes a Genius?"	17 February 2010	13
"Did Cooking Make Us Human?"	2 March 2010	14
"Is Everything We Know About the Universe Wrong?"	9 March 2010	15

== Series 47: 2010–2011 ==
Title	Original broadcast date	Episode
"The End of God?: A Horizon Guide to Science and Religion"	21 September 2010	—
"Back from the Dead"	27 September 2010	1
"The Death of the Oceans?"	4 October 2010	2
"What Happened Before the Big Bang?"	11 October 2010	3
"Is Seeing Believing?"	18 October 2010	4
"Miracle Cure? A Decade of the Human Genome"	25 October 2010	5
"Asteroids – The Good, the Bad and the Ugly"	3 November 2010	6
"Deepwater Disaster – The Untold Story"	16 November 2010	7
"What Makes Us Clever? A Horizon Guide to Intelligence"	6 January 2011	—
"What Is One Degree?"	10 January 2011	8
"What Is Reality?"	17 January 2011	9
"Science Under Attack"	24 January 2011	10
"The Secret World of Pain"	31 January 2011	11
"Surviving a Car Crash"	7 February 2011	12
"How to Mend a Broken Heart"	14 February 2011	13
"Are We Still Evolving?"	1 March 2011	14
"Predators in Your Backyard"	8 March 2011	15
"Japan Earthquake: A Horizon Special with Iain Stewart"	27 March 2011	—
"The Space Shuttle: A Horizon Guide"	10 April 2011	—
"The End of the World? A Horizon Guide to Armageddon"	12 May 2011	—

== Series 48: 2011–2012 ==
Title	Original broadcast date	Episode
"Do You See What I See"	8 August 2011	1
"Carrot or Stick: A Horizon Guide to Raising Kids"	11 August 2011	—
"Seeing Stars"	15 August 2011	2
"The Nine Months That Made You"	22 August 2011	3
"The Core"	31 August 2011	4
"Are You Good or Evil?"	7 September 2011	5
"Fukushima: Is Nuclear Power Safe?"	14 September 2011	6
"Extinct: A Horizon Guide to Dinosaurs"	21 September 2011	—
"The Hunt for the Higgs"	9 January 2012	—
"Playing God"	17 January 2012	7
"The Truth About Exercise"	28 February 2012	8
"Woof! A Horizon Guide to Dogs"	1 March 2012	—
"Solar Storms: The Threat to Planet Earth"	6 March 2012	9
"Out of Control?"	13 March 2012	10
"The Truth About Fat"	20 March 2012	11
"Global Weirding"	27 March 2012	12
"The Hunt for AI"	3 April 2012	13
"Defeating Cancer"	10 April 2012	14
"Stuff: A Horizon Guide to Materials"	19 April 2012	—

== Series 49: 2012–2013 ==
Title	Original broadcast date	Episode
"The Transit of Venus: A Horizon Special"	5 June 2012	—
"Blink: A Horizon Guide to the Senses"	11 July 2012	—
"Immortal? A Horizon Guide to Ageing"	17 July 2012	—
"The Truth About Looking Young"	23 July 2012	1
"Mission to Mars"	30 July 2012	2
"Eat, Fast and Live Longer"	6 August 2012	3
"How Big Is the Universe?"	27 August 2012	4
"How Small Is the Universe?"	3 September 2012	5
"Defeating the Superbugs"	10 September 2012	6
"The Final Frontier? A Horizon Guide to the Universe"	17 October 2012	—
"The Truth About Meteors: A Horizon Special"	3 March 2013	7
"The Creative Brain – How Insight Works"	14 March 2013	8
"How to Avoid Mistakes in Surgery"	21 March 2013	9
"Mend Me: A Horizon Guide to Transplants"	27 March 2013	—
"The Truth about Taste"	28 March 2013	10
"The Age of Big Data"	4 April 2013	11
"Tomorrow's World: A Horizon Special"	11 April 2013	—
"The Secret Life of the Cat"	13 June 2013	12
"Little Cat Diaries"	14 June 2013	13
"Fracking: The New Energy Rush"	19 June 2013	14
"Swallowed by a Black Hole"	26 June 2013	15
"What Makes Us Human?"	3 July 2013	16
"The Truth About Personality"	10 July 2013	17

== Series 50: 2013–2014 ==
Title	Original broadcast date	Episode
"What's Killing Our Bees? A Horizon Special"	2 August 2013	1
"Monitor Me"	12 August 2013	2
"Defeating the Hackers"	19 August 2013	3
"Dinosaurs: The Hunt for Life"	26 August 2013	4
"Sex: A Horizon Guide"	11 September 2013	—
"Impact! A Horizon Guide to Plane Crashes"	14 October 2013	—
"Impact! A Horizon Guide to Car Crashes"	21 October 2013	—
"Comet of the Century: A Horizon Special"	23 November 2013	—
"Sugar v Fat"	29 January 2014	5
"Swallowed by a Sink Hole"	3 February 2014	6
"Man on Mars: Mission to the Red Planet"	10 February 2014	7
"The Power of the Placebo"	17 February 2014	8
"How You Really Make Decisions"	26 February 2014	9
"Living with Autism"	1 April 2014	10
"The £10 Million Challenge"	22 May 2014	—
"Where is Flight MH370?"	17 June 2014	11
"What's Wrong with Our Weather?"	17 July 2014	12

== Series 51: 2014–2015 ==
Title	Original broadcast date	Episode
"Should I Eat Meat? The Big Health Dilemma"	18 August 2014	1
"Should I Eat Meat? How to Feed the Planet"	20 August 2014	2
"Allergies: Modern Life and Me"	27 August 2014	3
"Inside the Dark Web"	3 September 2014	4
"Ebola: The Search for a Cure"	10 September 2014	6
"Is Your Brain Male or Female?"	29 September 2014	7
"Cat Watch 2014: The New Horizon Experiment: A Cat's Eye View"	7 October 2014	—
"Cat Watch 2014: The New Horizon Experiment: The Lion in Your Lap"	8 October 2014	—
"Cat Watch 2014: The New Horizon Experiment: Cat Talk"	9 October 2014	—
"What's the Right Diet for You? A Horizon Special: Episode 1"	12 January 2015	—
"What's the Right Diet for You? A Horizon Special: Episode 2"	13 January 2015	—
"What's the Right Diet for You? A Horizon Special: Episode 3"	14 January 2015	—
"Secrets of the Solar System"	3 March 2015	8
"Climate Change: A Horizon Guide"	4 March 2015	—
"The Mystery of Murder: A Horizon Guide"	9 March 2015	—
"Aftershock: The Hunt for Gravitational Waves"	10 March 2015	9
"Dancing in the Dark: The End of Physics?"	17 March 2015	10
"70 Million Animal Mummies: Egypt's Dark Secret"	11 May 2015	11
"Is Binge Drinking Really That Bad?"	20 May 2015	12
"The Trouble with Space Junk"	5 August 2015	13
"Are Health Tests Really a Good Idea?"	12 August 2015	14
"First Britons"	19 August 2015	15
"OCD: A Monster in My Mind"	26 August 2015	16
"Which Universe Are We In?"	2 September 2015	17
"Cosmic Dawn: The Real Moment of Creation"	9 September 2015	18
"Are Video Games Really That Bad?"	16 September 2015	19
"Tim Peake Special: How to Be an Astronaut"	13 December 2015	—

== Series 52: 2016 ==
Title	Original broadcast date	Episode
"The Immortalist"	16 March 2016	1
"Project Greenglow: The Quest for Gravity Control"	23 March 2016	2
"The Mystery of Dark Energy"	30 March 2016	3
"Oceans of the Solar System"	6 April 2016	4
"The End of the Solar System"	13 April 2016	5
"Should We Close Our Zoos?"	17 April 2016	6
"How to Find Love Online"	25 April 2016	7
"Ice Station Antarctica"	4 May 2016	8
"Curing Alzheimer's"	11 May 2016	9
"E-Cigarettes: Miracle or Menace?"	22 May 2016	10
"Why Are We Getting So Fat?"	7 June 2016	11
"Sports Doping: Winning at Any Cost?"	19 July 2016	12
"Inside CERN"	10 August 2016	13
"My Amazing Twin"	25 August 2016	14
"Jimmy Carr and the Science of Laughter"	11 September 2016	15
"The Lost Tribes of Humanity"	12 October 2016	16
"The Wildest Weather in the Universe"	23 October 2016	17

== Series 53: 2017 ==
Title	Original broadcast date	Episode
"Clean Eating: The Dirty Truth"	19 January 2017	01
"Hair Care Secrets"	23 January 2017	02
"ADHD and Me with Rory Bremner"	25 April 2017	03
"Why Did I Go Mad?"	2 May 2017	04
"Strange Signals from Outer Space!"	16 May 2017	05
"Space Volcanoes"	23 May 2017	06
"Antarctica: Ice Station Rescue"	7 June 2017	07
"Cyber Attack: The Day the NHS Stopped"	12 June 2017	08
"10 Things You Need To Know About The Future"	19 June 2017	09
"Dawn of the Driverless Car"	29 June 2017	10
"Dippy and the Whale"	13 July 2017	11
"What Makes a Psychopath?"	29 August 2017	12
"Mars: A Traveller's Guide"	12 September 2017	13
"Goodbye Cassini: Hello Saturn"	18 September 2017	14
"Being Transgender"	26 September 2017	15

== Series 54: 2018 ==
Title	Original broadcast date	Episode
"My Amazing Brain: Richard's War"	5 February 2018	01
"Teenagers vs Cancer: A User's Guide"	26 June 2018	02
"How to Build a Time Machine"	10 July 2018	03
"Spina Bifida & Me"	26 July 2018	04
"Jupiter Revealed"	7 August 2018	05
"Stopping Male Suicide"	21 August 2018	06
"A Week Without Lying: The Honesty Experiment"	29 August 2018	07
"The Horizon Guide to AI"	4 September 2018	—
"The Placebo Experiment: Can My Brain Cure My Body?"	4 October 2018	08
"Body Clock: What makes us tick?"	11 October 2018	09
"Avalanche: Making a Deadly Snowstorm"	21 October 2018	10
"Vitamin Pills: Miracle or Myth?"	25 October 2018	11
"Diagnosis on Demand? The Computer Will See You Now"	1 November 2018	12
"The Contraceptive Pill: How Safe Is It?"	19 November 2018	13

== Series 55: 2019 ==
Title	Original broadcast date	Episode
"We Need to Talk About Death"	23 January 2019	01
"Britain’s Next Air Disaster? Drones"	1 July 2019	02
"The Honest Supermarket: What's Really in Our Food?"	8 July 2019	03
"Inside the Social Network: Facebook's Difficult Year"	16 July 2019	04
"The 250 Million Pound Cancer Cure"	22 July 2019	05
"Cannabis: Miracle Medicine or Dangerous Drug?"	28 August 2019	06

== Series 56: 2020 ==
Title	Original broadcast date	Episode
"Addicted to Painkillers? Britain’s Opioid Crisis"	16 January 2020	01
"Chris Packham: 7.7 Billion People and Counting"	21 January 2020	02
"Toxic Town: The Corby Poisonings"	23 March 2020	03
"Coronavirus Special - Part 1"	9 April 2020	04
"The Restaurant that Burns Off Calories"	20 April 2020	05
"Hubble: The Wonders of Space Revealed"	24 April 2020	06
"The Great British Intelligence Test"	4 May 2020	07
"Coronavirus Special - Part 2"	19 May 2020	08
"What's the Matter with Tony Slattery?"	21 May 2020	09
"Pluto: Back From the Dead"	6 July 2020	10

== Series 57: 2021 ==
Title	Original broadcast date	Episode
"Feast to Save the Planet"	4 January 2021	01
"Coronavirus Special - What We Know Now"	25 February 2021	02
"The Secret Science of Sewage"	18 March 2021	03
Dr George McGavin and Dr Zoe Laughlin follow each stage of the sewage treatment process, revealing what sewage can tell us about our lives, and the biotechnology harnessed to clean it, making the waste-water safe enough to return to the environment.
"Horizon Special: The Vaccine"	16 June 2021	04

== Series 58: 2022 ==
Title	Original broadcast date	Episode
"How to Sleep Well with Michael Mosley"	31 March 2022	01
"Making Sense of Cancer with Hannah Fry"	2 June 2022	02
"Super Telescope: Mission to the Edge of the Universe"	14 July 2022	03

== 2024–2026 ==
Since 2022 a number of standalone documentaries have been broadcast with Horizon branding at the beginning, although the BBC catalogues them as standalone and does not include them in its own Horizon episode list.

Title	Original broadcast date	Episode
"The Battle to Beat Malaria"	22 July 2024	N/A
"Confessions of a Brain Surgeon"	18 August 2025	N/A
"Disease X: Hunting the Next Pandemic"	22 September 2025	N/A
"Artemis: To the Moon and Back"	14 April 2026	N/A
