= Tequesta =

Native American tribe

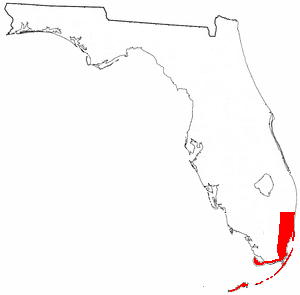
- Approximate territory of the Tequesta in the 16th century in present-day South Florida

Regions with significant populations
- Present-day South Florida (from 3rd century BCE to mid-18th century)

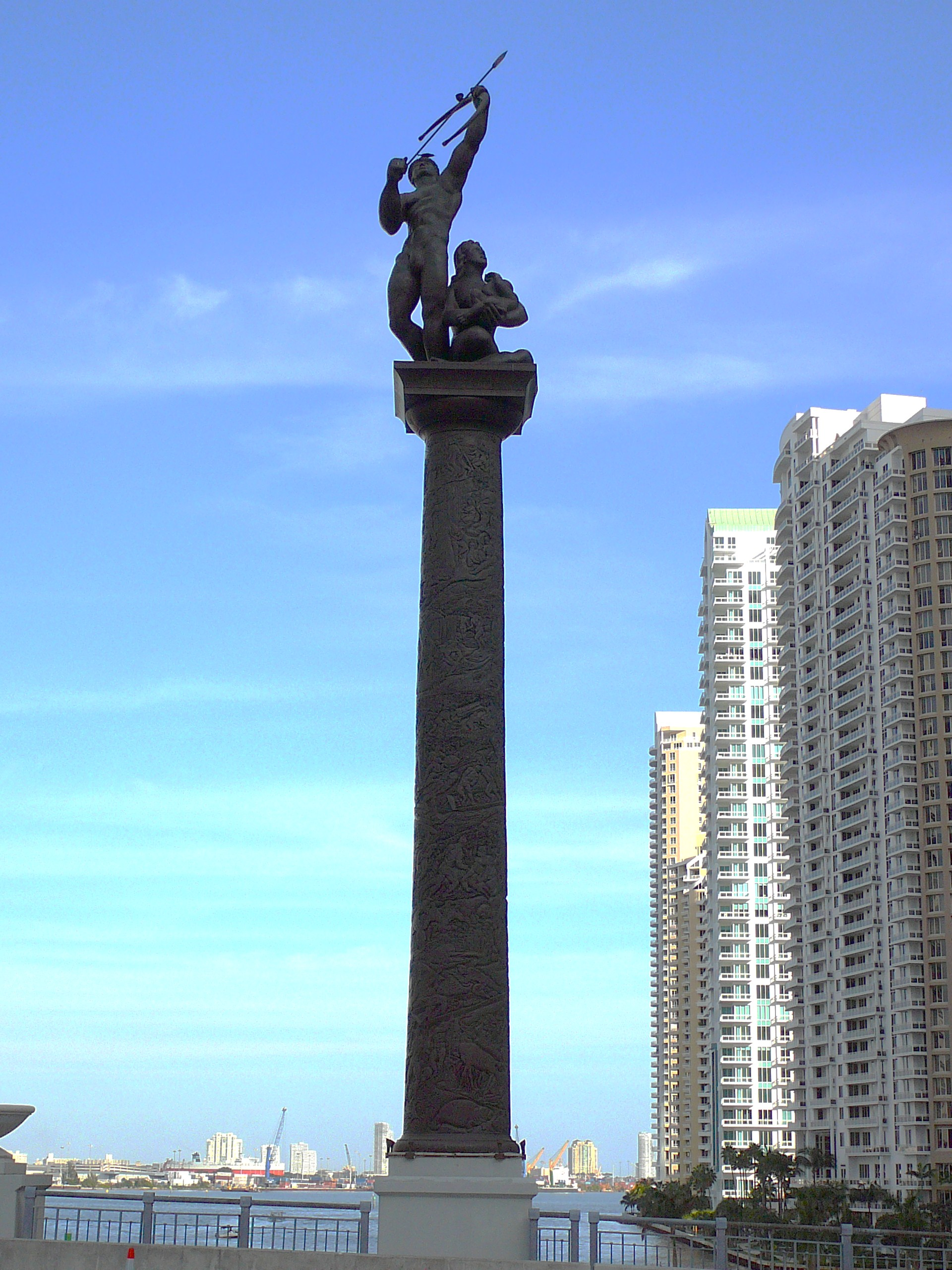
A bronze statue of a Tequesta warrior and his family on the Brickell Avenue Bridge, Miami, created by Manuel Carbonell.

The Tequesta, also Tekesta, Tegesta, Chequesta, Vizcaynos, were a Native American tribe on the Southeastern Atlantic coast of Florida. They had infrequent contact with Europeans and had largely migrated by the middle of the 18th century.

== Location and extent ==
The Tequesta lived in the southeastern parts of present-day Florida. They lived in the region since the 3rd century BC in the late Archaic period of the continent, and remained for roughly 2,000 years, By the 1800s, most had died as a result of settlement battles, slavery, and disease. The Tequesta tribe had only a few survivors by the time that Spanish Florida was traded to the British, who then established the area as part of the province of East Florida.

The Tequesta tribe lived on Biscayne Bay in what is now Miami-Dade County and further north in Broward County at least as far Pompano Beach. Their territory may have also included the northern half of Broward County and the southern half of Palm Beach County. They also occupied the Florida Keys at times, and may have had a village on Cape Sable, at the southern end of the Florida peninsula, in the 16th century. Their central town (called "Tequesta" by the Spaniards in honor of the chief) was on the north bank of the Miami River. A village had been at that site for at least 2,000 years. The Tequesta situated their towns and camps at the mouths of rivers and streams, on inlets from the Atlantic Ocean to inland waters, and on barrier islands and keys.

The Tequesta were more or less dominated by the more numerous Calusa of the southwest coast of Florida. The Tequesta were closely allied to their immediate neighbors to the north, the Jaega. Estimates of the number of Tequesta at the time of initial European contact range from 800 to 10,000, while estimates of the number of Calusa on the southwest coast of Florida range from 2,000 to 20,000. Occupation of the Florida Keys may have swung back and forth between the two tribes. Although Spanish records note a Tequesta village on Cape Sable, Calusa artifacts outnumber Tequesta artifacts by four to one at its archaeological sites.

On a map the Dutch cartographer Hessel Gerritsz published in 1630 in Joannes de Laet's History of the New World, the Florida peninsula is labeled "Tegesta" after the tribe. A map from the 18th century labeled the area around Biscayne Bay "Tekesta". A 1794 map by cartographer Bernard Romans labeled this area "Tegesta".

== Origins ==
The archaeological record of the Glades culture, which included the area occupied by the Tequestas, indicates a continuous development of an indigenous ceramics tradition from about 700 BCE until after European contact. The Tequesta were once thought to be related to the Taino, the Arawakan people of the Antilles, but most anthropologists now doubt this, based on archaeological information and the length of their establishment in Florida. Carl O. Sauer called the Florida Straits "one of the most strongly marked cultural boundaries in the New World", noting that the Straits were also a boundary between agricultural systems, with Florida Native Americans growing seed crops that originated in Mexico, while the Lucayans of the Bahamas grew root crops that originated in South America.

== Language ==
Tequesta
- Native to: United States
- Region: Florida
- Ethnicity: Tequesta
- Extinct: 18th century
- Language family: unclassified (Calusa?)

Language codes
- ISO 639-3: None (mis)
- Linguist List: 07y
- Glottolog: None

The Tequesta language may have been closely related to the language of the Calusas of the southwest Florida coast and the Mayaimis who lived around Lake Okeechobee in the middle of the lower Florida peninsula. Only ten words from the languages of those tribes have recorded meanings, most of them from Calusa. The linguist Julian Granberry states that the Tequesta probably spoke the same language as the Calusa, which in his analysis relates to the Tunica language.

== Diet ==
The Tequestas did not practice any form of agriculture. They fished, hunted, and gathered the fruit and roots of local plants. Most of their food came from the sea. Hernando de Escalante Fontaneda, who lived among the tribes of southern Florida for seventeen years in the 16th century, described their "common" diet as "fish, turtle and snails, and tunny and whale"; the "sea-wolf" (Caribbean monk seal) was reserved for the upper classes. According to Fontaneda, a lesser part of the diet consisted of trunkfish and lobster. The "fish" caught included manatees, sharks, sailfish, porpoises, stingrays, and small fish. Despite their local abundance, clams, oysters and conches were only a minor part of the Tequesta diet (their shells are much less common at Tequesta archeological sites than they are at Calusa or Jaega sites). Venison was also popular; deer bones are frequently found in archeological sites, as are terrapin shells and bones. Sea turtles and their eggs were consumed during the turtles' nesting season.

The Tequesta gathered many plant foods, including saw palmetto (Serenoa repens) berries, cocoplums (Chrysobalanus icaco), sea grapes (Coccoloba uvifera), prickly pear (nopal) fruits (Opuntia spp.), gopher apples (Licania michauxii), pigeon plums (Cocoloba diversifolia), palm nuts, false mastic seeds, cabbage palm (Sabal palmetto), and hog plum (Ximenia americana). The roots of certain plants, such as Smilax spp. and coontie (Zamia integrifolia), were edible when ground into flour, processed to remove toxins (in the case of coontie), and made into a type of unleavened bread. (Archaeologists have commented, however, on the lack of evidence for coontie use in excavated sites.) Briton Hammon, the sole survivor of a British sloop that was attacked by Tequestas after grounding off Key Biscayne in 1748, reported that the Tequestas fed him boil'd corn.

The Tequestas changed their habitation during the year. In particular, most of the inhabitants of the main village relocated to barrier islands or to the Florida Keys during the worst of the mosquito season, which lasted about three months. While the resources of the Biscayne Bay area and the Florida Keys allowed for a somewhat settled non-agricultural existence, they were not as rich as those of the southwest Florida coast, home of the more numerous Calusa.

== Housing, and clothing ==
Briton Hammon reported that the Tequesta lived in "hutts". Other tribes in southern Florida lived in houses with wooden posts, raised floors, and roofs thatched with palmetto leaves, something like the chickees of the Seminoles. These houses may have had temporary walls of plaited palmetto-leaf mats to break the wind or block the sun.

Clothing was minimal. The men wore a sort of loincloth made from deer hide, while the women wore skirts of Spanish moss or plant fibers hanging from a belt.

== Customs ==
One account by a Spanish historian of the time says that the Tequesta had a tradition of burying their chiefs by burying the small bones with the body, and putting the large bones in a box for the village people to adore and hold as their gods. Another account says that the Tequestas stripped the flesh from the bones and distributed the cleaned bones to the dead chief's relatives, with the larger bones going to the closest relations. They reportedly burned the removed flesh while dancing around the fire and chanting.

There is no concrete evidence that the Tequesta men consumed cassina, or the black drink. However, many nearby and similar tribes did, so it is likely that they did as well in ceremonies similar to those throughout the southeastern United States.

The Spanish missionaries also reported that the Tequesta worshipped a stuffed deer as the representative of the sun, and as late as 1743 worshipped a picture of a badly deformed barracuda crossed by a harpoon, and surrounded by small tongue-like figures painted on a small board. It is possible these practices were misunderstood by the missionaries or misrepresented as being present for all Tequesta. Deer are common in the area. There was also a god of the graveyard, a bird's head carved in pine. The painted board and bird's head were stored in a temple in the cemetery, along with carved masks used in festivals. By this time the tribe's shaman was calling himself a bishop. The Tequesta also believed that humans have three souls. One in the eyes, one in the shadow, and one in the reflection.

The Tequestas may have practiced human sacrifice. While en route from Havana to Biscayne Bay in 1743, Spanish missionaries heard that the Native Americans of the Keys (apparently including the Tequestas) had gone to Santaluz (the village of Santa Lucea was at the St. Lucie Inlet) for a celebration of a recent peace treaty, and that the chief of Santaluz was going to sacrifice a young girl as part of the celebration. The missionaries sent a message to the chief begging him not to sacrifice the girl, and the chief relented.Father Alaña also claimed that when someone important died, they killed children who could serve them in the afterlife. This would associate high status with human sacrifice, though his claim is the primary evidence for these theories.

== Miami Circle ==
The Miami Circle is located on the site of a known Tequesta village south of the mouth of the Miami River (probably the town of Tequesta). It consists of 24 large holes or basins, and many smaller holes, which have been cut into bedrock. Together these holes form a circle approximately 38 feet in diameter. Other arrangements of holes are apparent as well. It is possible that these were just from a septic tank. The holes may simply be remnants of the drain field from the 1950s. The circle was discovered during an archeological survey of a site being cleared for construction of a high-rise building. Charcoal samples collected in the circle have been radiocarbon-dated to approximately 100 CE, 1,900 years ago. Radiocarbon-dating of sea shells eaten at the site date back as far as 730 BCE, and suggest a permanent settlement was established here more than 2,700 years ago. The circle is on the south side of the Miami River. Recent archaeological work has found a larger Tequesta site on the north side of the river that likely existed concurrently with the Miami Circle. Remnants of a sea turtle, a shark, and a dolphin have also been found at the site. They appear to be more recent, placed sometime after the circle would have been in use. In 1999, anthropologist and archaeologist Jerald T. Milanich, a specialist in the cultures of pre-Columbian Southeastern U.S. native peoples, wrote an article about the Miami Circle which was published in Archaeology. In the article, Milanich expresses skepticism concerning archaeologist Robert S. Carr's report that the post holes were used to anchor posts for a circular building erected by Indians 1,000 or even 2,000 years ago. Milanich's article caused some controversy, but he advised caution regarding Carr's interpretation of the holes' purpose, especially in light of the attendant hype generated in the local media, and suggested steps that should be taken to investigate the matter further.

== Post-European-contact ==
In 1513, Juan Ponce de León stopped at a bay on the Florida coast that he called Chequesta, which apparently was what is now called Biscayne Bay. In 1565 one of the ships in Pedro Menéndez de Avilés' fleet took refuge from a storm in Biscayne Bay. The main Tequesta village was located there, and Menéndez was well received by the Tequestas. The Jesuits with him took the Tequesta chief's nephew with them back to Havana, Cuba, to be educated, while the chief's brother went to Spain with Menéndez, where he converted to Christianity. In March 1567, Menéndez returned to the Tequesta and established a mission within a stockade, situated near the south bank of the Miami River below the native village. Menendez left a contingent of thirty soldiers and the Jesuit brother Francisco Villareal to convert the Tequestas to Christianity. Villareal had learned something of the Tequesta language from the chief's nephew in Havana. He felt he had been winning converts until the soldiers executed an uncle of the chief. Brother Francisco was forced to abandon the mission for a while, but when the chief's brother returned from Spain, Brother Francisco was able to return. However, the mission was abandoned shortly thereafter, in 1570.

Starting in 1704, it was the policy of the Spanish government to resettle Florida Native Americans in Cuba so that they could be indoctrinated into the Catholic faith. The first group of these Native Americans, including the cacique of Cayo de Guesos (Key West), arrived in Cuba in 1704, and most, if not all of them, soon died. In 1710, 280 Florida Native Americans were taken to Cuba where almost 200 soon died. The survivors were returned to the Keys in 1716 or 1718. In 1732 some Native Americans fled from the Keys to Cuba.

In early 1743 the Governor of Cuba received a petition from three Calusa chiefs who were visiting in Havana. The petition, which was written in Spanish and showed an understanding of how the government and church bureaucracies worked, asked that missionaries be sent to the Cayos (Florida Keys) to provide religious instruction. The Governor and his advisors finally decided it would be cheaper to send missionaries to the Keys rather than bringing the Native Americans to Cuba, and that keeping the Native Americans in the Keys would mean they would be available to help shipwrecked Spanish sailors and keep the British out of the area.

The governor sent two Jesuit missionaries from Havana, Fathers Mónaco and Alaña, with an escort of soldiers. On reaching Biscayne Bay, they established a chapel and fort at the mouth of a river feeding into Biscayne Bay that they called the Rio Ratones. This may have been the Little River, in the northern part of Biscayne Bay, or the Miami River.

The Spanish missionaries were not well received. The Keys Indians, as the Spanish called them, denied that they had requested missionaries. They did permit a mission to be established because the Spanish had brought gifts for them, but the cacique denied that the King of Spain had dominion over his land, and insisted on tribute for allowing the Spanish to build a church or bring in settlers. The Native Americans demanded food, rum and clothing, but refused to work for the Spanish. Father Morano reported attacks on the mission by bands of Uchizas (the Creeks who later became known as Seminoles).

Fathers Mónaco and Alaña developed a plan to have a stockade manned by twenty-five soldiers, and to bring in Spanish settlers to grow food for the soldiers and the Native Americans. They felt that the new settlement would soon supplant the need for St. Augustine. Father Alaña returned to Havana, leaving twelve soldiers and a corporal to protect Father Mónaco.

The governor in Havana was not pleased. He ordered that Father Mónaco and the soldiers be withdrawn, and the stockade burned to deny it to the Uchizas. He also forwarded the missionaries' plan to Spain, where the Council of the Indies decided that the proposed mission on Biscayne Bay would be costly and impractical. The second attempt to establish a mission on Biscayne Bay had lasted less than three months.

When Spain surrendered Florida to Britain in 1763, the remaining Tequestas, along with other Native Americans that had taken refuge in the Florida Keys, were evacuated to Cuba. In the 1770s, Bernard Romans reported seeing abandoned villages in the area, but no inhabitants.

== See also ==
- Pompano Beach Mound: another Tequesta archaeological site
