= John Winslow (British Army officer) =

British Army officer

Major-General John Winslow
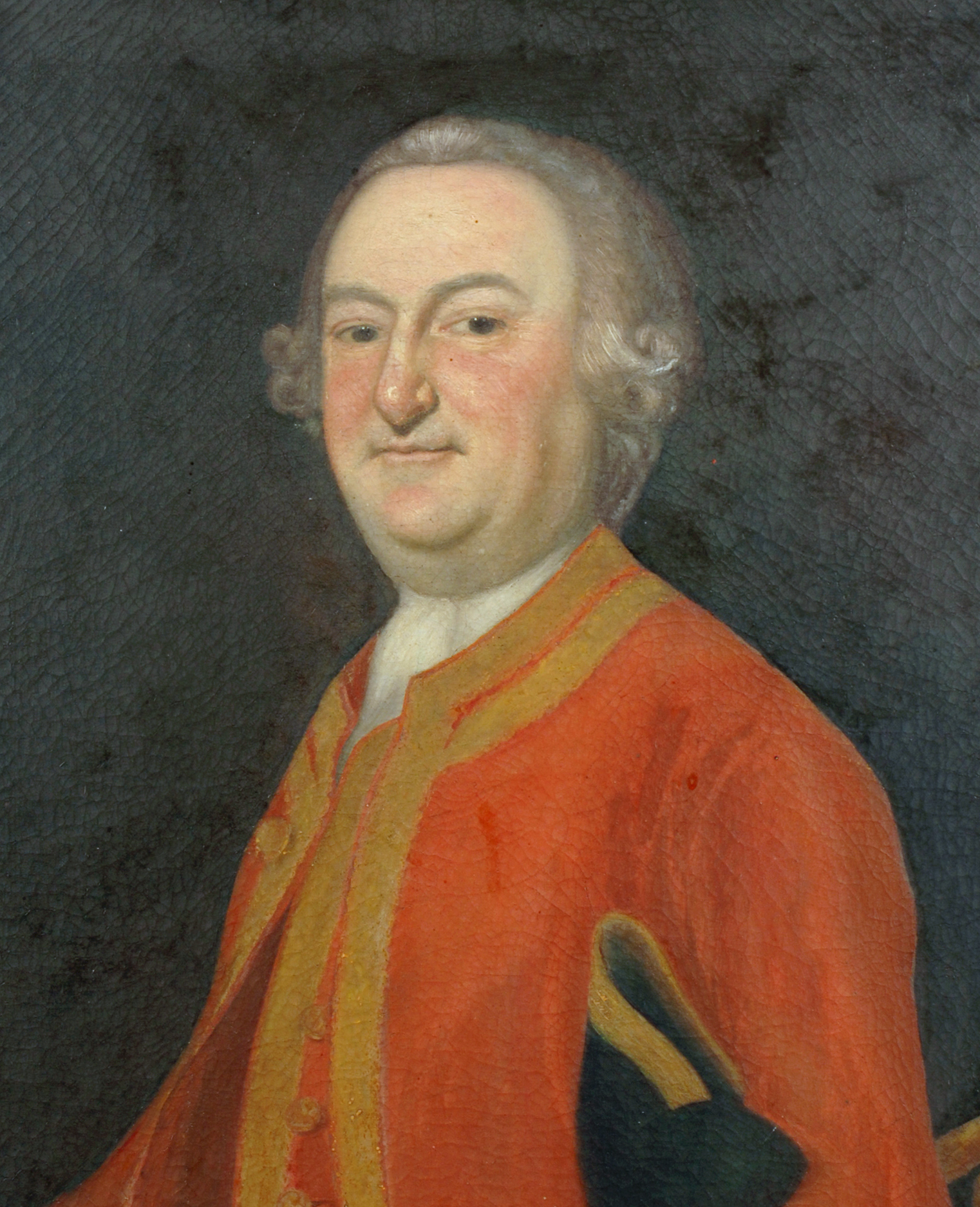
- Portrait by Joseph Blackburn
- Born: 10 May 1703; Marshfield, Province of Massachusetts Bay
- Died: 17 April 1774 (aged 70) Hingham, Province of Massachusetts Bay

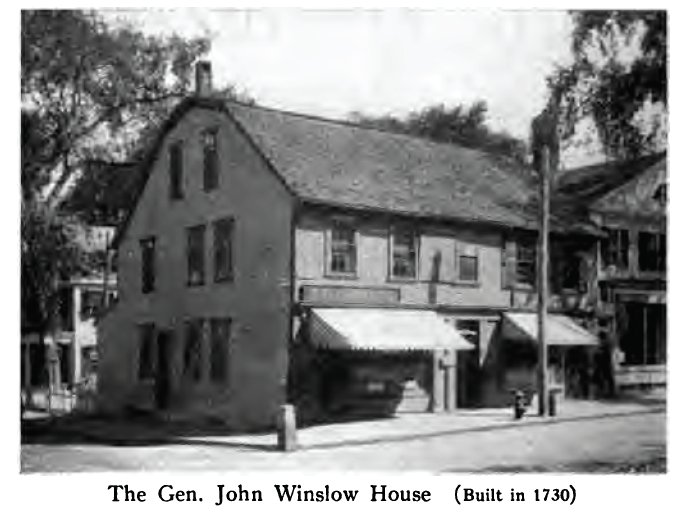
The General John Winslow House (1730), Plymouth Mass, photographed 1921

Major-General John Winslow (10 May 1703 – 17 April 1774), descendant of Edward Winslow, was a British Army officer.

== Early life ==
John Winslow belonged to one of the most prominent families of New England; his great-grandfather Edward and grandfather Josiah Winslow had both been governors of the Plymouth Colony. He was born in Marshfield, Massachusetts in 1703 as son of Sarah and Isaac Winslow. (During Father Rale's War, Winslows older brother Josiah was given the command of Fort St. George (Thomaston, Maine) and was killed by natives of the Wabanaki Confederacy in the Northeast Coast Campaign (1724). The following year, Winslow named his first born after his deceased brother.)

In 1725, he married Mary Little, a descendant of Richard Warren. They had three children: Josiah, Pelham and Isaac Winslow. One of his slaves was Briton Hammon who published the Narrative of the Uncommon Suffering and Surprizing Deliverance of Briton Hammon, a Negro Man in 1760.

After holding a few minor positions in Plymouth, he was commissioned captain of a provincial company in a failed British expedition to Cuba in 1740. Following this he transferred to the British Army and served as captain in the 40th Foot at Annapolis Royal in Nova Scotia, and St John's in Newfoundland.

== Seven Years War ==
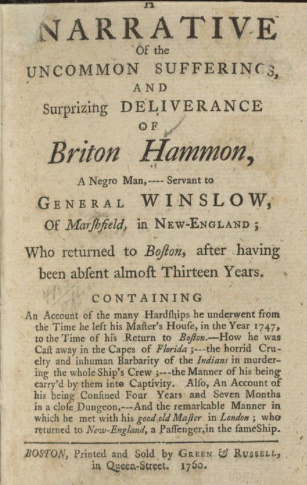
Narrative of Winslow's former slave Briton Hammon

In 1754, he was promoted major-general of militia by Governor William Shirley of Massachusetts and put in command of a force of 800 men which was sent to the Kennebec River in Maine to consolidate British positions and prevent French encroachments. There he built two forts, Fort Halifax (Maine) and Fort Western.

In 1755, he was appointed lieutenant-colonel of a provincial regiment raised by Shirley to aid Lieutenant Governor Charles Lawrence of Nova Scotia in his attempts to sweep French Acadian influence from the province, and played an important role at the capture of Fort Beauséjour in June 1755.

During the Bay of Fundy Campaign (1755), Winslow was then ordered to proceed to Grand-Pré, Nova Scotia, to remove the Acadian population, as part of the infamous Great Upheaval. Although often believed solely responsible for carrying out the deportation, Winslow was in charge of only one segment of a much larger operation. On 5 September 1755 he informed the assembled Acadian men that they and their families were to be removed from the province. Winslow termed the business "Very Disagreable to my natural make & Temper," in his "Journal of Colonel John Winslow of the provincial troops, while engaged in removing the Acadian inhabitants from Grand Pre". The numerous delays in arranging transports caused the deportation to take far longer than had been anticipated, but by November he had shipped 1,510 Acadians to Pennsylvania, Maryland, and other British colonies to the south.

He compiled a list of Acadian males that were deported.

Winslow returned to Massachusetts in November 1755, but only a couple of months later he was appointed by Shirley (then temporary commander-in-chief), to command the provincial troops in an expedition against Fort St. Frédéric, New York. However, in March 1756 the new commander-in-chief, Lord Loudoun, arrived from Britain, and Winslow fought bitterly with him over his proposed integration of the provincial troops with the regulars. The provincial soldiers had enlisted to serve only under their own officers, and feared the hard discipline, with floggings and hangings, that was part of the regular army. And their officers feared that the integration could result in them losing their rank, as they held it only by colonial commission. The issue nearly developed into a mutiny of the provincial troops and a revolt of their officers, but Winslow eventually agreed to the integration under threats from Loudoun.

In 1757 Winslow returned to Massachusetts and civilian life. He represented Marshfield in the General Court from 1757 to 1758 and from 1761 to 1765. In 1762 he served as a member of the St Croix River boundary commission, and in about 1766 he moved to Hingham, Massachusetts, where he died in 1774.

== Legacy ==
The town of Winslow, Maine is named for General Winslow.
