= Pompano Beach Mound =

Historic Florida Tequesta burial mound

- U.S. National Register of Historic Places
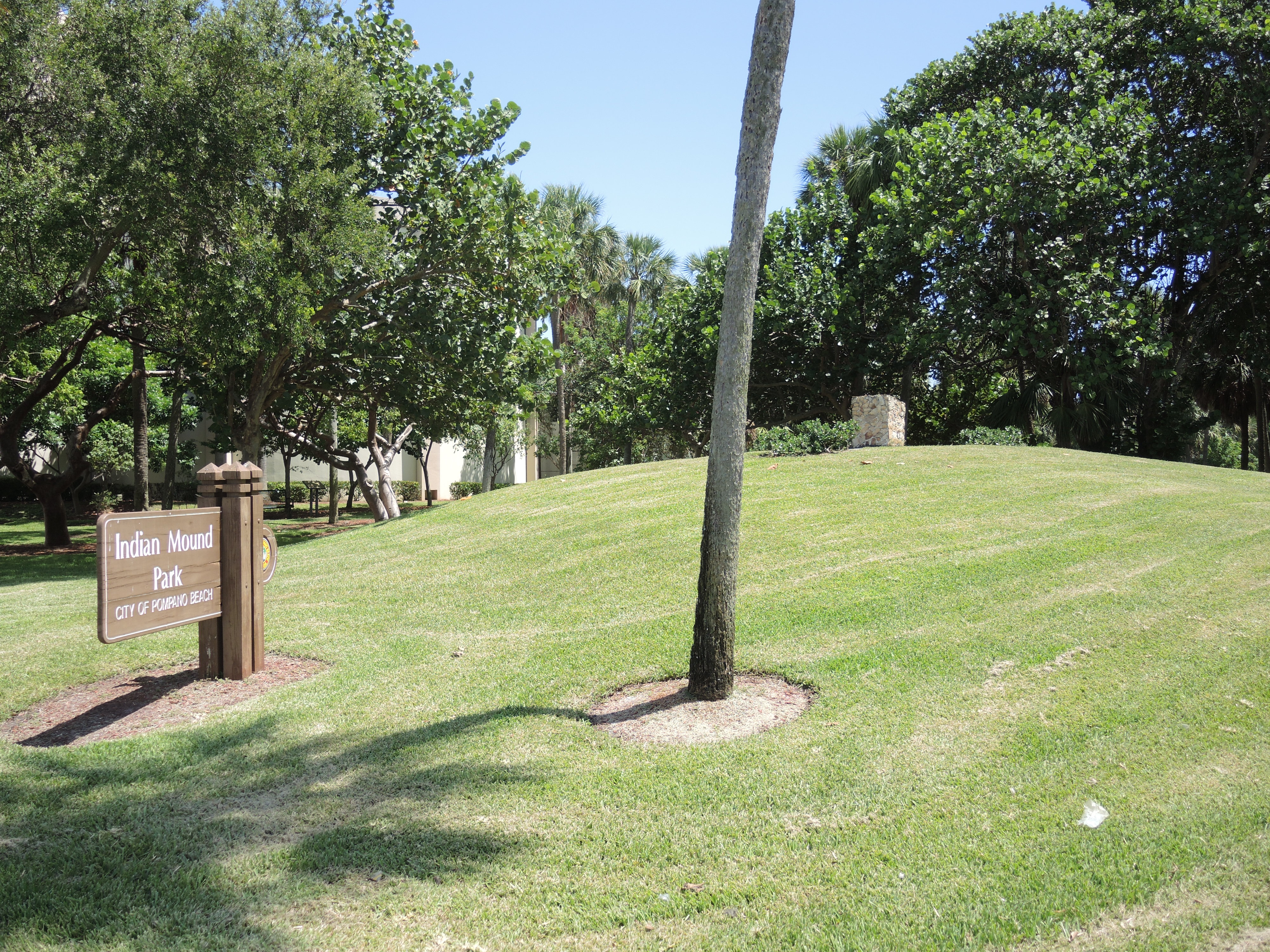
- Pompano Beach Mound

- Location within Florida Location within the United States
- Location: Pompano Beach, Florida
- Coordinates: 26°13′18″N 80°5′33″W
- Area: less than one acre
- NRHP reference No.: 14000151
- Added to NRHP: 17 April 2014

The Pompano Beach Mound, located at Indian Mound Park in Pompano Beach, Florida, in Broward County, is a 100-foot (30 m) wide, 7-foot (2.1 m) tall oval Tequesta burial mound. It was listed on the National Register of Historic Places on April 17, 2014.

== Setting ==
The mound sits at the southeast edge of Pompano Beach on the western shore of a long narrow Atlantic coast barrier island. The surrounding area is a heavily developed, densely populated mixed use residential neighborhood. In prehistoric times the site was a tropical hardwood hammock opposite Lake Santa Barbara at the mouth of Cypress Creek. The eastern side would have been protected from the Atlantic Ocean by sand dunes and the associated vegetation. At the base of the mound is a 6-inch (15 cm) layer of "black dirt and shell with refuse", a likely indication that it was built atop a seasonal camp or village that had been inhabited before the mound was built.

== History ==
The Tequesta, valuing their dead, placed them in a special place to decompose, then cleaned and prepared the bones for interment in a burial mound. A 1938 excavation unearthed a wooden figure dating to 700 CE; this figure was called the "Keeper of the Mound" by amateur archeologists and the local press. The mound, dating to as early as 500 CE, has been a park since 1926, and a Pompano Beach city park since the late 1950s.

One of 20 to 50 burial mounds erected by the Tequesta in central to southern Florida, it is the only surviving Indian burial mound in urban Broward County. Artifacts discovered near the mound suggest the associated village may have been in existence as late as 1763 CE. Ceramics from the site date from across the three periods of the Glades culture.

== Modern times ==
Around 1895 the area near the mound was farmed by James W. Pearce, who had settled there. Its designation as a park in 1926 marks it as an early example of historic preservation in Florida. Known as the "Pompano Beach Indian Mound", it has been studied extensively by amateur and professional archeologists since 1929. Artifacts from the site are curated at the Smithsonian Institution and the Florida Museum of Natural History. The first excavation of the mound by a formally trained archeologist was conducted in 1937 by John Mann Goggin. Goggin's work at the mound contributed to his development of a timeline of the cultures of Florida and was important in establishing his career as an archeologist.

In 1938 a study of the mound, supervised by William C. Orchard, was financed by the Heye Foundation Museum of the American Indian. Orchard excavated and removed most of a small check stamped bowl, a shell cup and bead, part of a shell celt, part of a stone celt, most of an iron knife and some pottery sherds. Orchard also removed the human burials remains of one individual. Orchard's permission to excavate was withdrawn by the city following objections from the local community. The remains were reported by the National Park Service in 2010 and will be repatriated to the Miccosukee Tribe of Indians of Florida in accordance with the Native American Graves Protection and Repatriation Act.

Human burial remains were also unearthed in 1940 by a permitted excavation and by looting. Between 1946 and 1954 Orin Fogle excavated and removed a Busycon pick, a Strombus celt, a bone awl, a fragment of fossilized bone and a collection of pottery sherds. Fogle also removed bones from at least seven individual human burials. He sold his collection from the mound to the Florida Museum of Natural History. As a part of the 50th anniversary celebration of the City of Pompano Beach in 1958, the site was rededicated as a park for historical preservation and two historical markers were placed. At that time it was also designated a rare bird sanctuary.

Archeologist Robert S. Carr surveyed the site in 1974, noting a second smaller mound nearby. When Carr returned for another survey in 1993 he noted the smaller mound had been destroyed by residential construction. In 2003 Christopher Eck surveyed the site and conducted limited excavations near the mound to evaluate the impact of community plans to replant some native coastal hammock plants and trees.

The first published mention of the site was possibly in an 1887 book, The East Coast of Florida: A Descriptive Narrative, written by J.M. Hawks about a journey made by the author in 1869. The site was added to the National Register of Historic Places in 2014.

== See also ==
- Miami Circle: another Tequesta archaeological site
