= Briton Hammon =

18th-century enslaved man of African descent, author of a 1760 autobiography

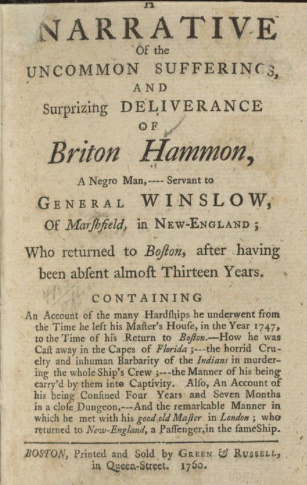
Narrative of Briton Hammon

Briton Hammon was a slave of African descent who lived in British America during the middle of the 18th century. On December 25, 1747, by leave of his owner, Hammon left his home in Marshfield, Massachusetts, to board a ship in neighboring Plymouth to work on a sailing ship headed for Jamaica. On June 15, 1748, the ship wrecked. Hammon and the crew were cast away off the coast of Florida, beginning a series of hardships and adventures that he chronicled in an autobiographical account, A Narrative of the Uncommon Sufferings, and Surprizing [sic] Deliverance of Briton Hammon, A Negro Man, first published in 1760. His experiences after the shipwreck included being held captive by the indigenous peoples of Florida, spending four years in a Spanish prison in Cuba, being rescued by a British lieutenant who smuggled him on board a British man-o-war, and then serving several years in the British Navy before suffering wounds during a skirmish with a French warship. Hammon was honorably discharged from the Royal Navy and recounted reuniting with his owner in London, England. The narrative concludes with his owner taking him back to New England.

== Encounter with indigenous Floridians ==
On December 25, 1747, Briton Hammon left Marshfield, Massachusetts, on his first expedition with the permission of his owner, General Winslow. He intended to go to Plymouth and from there Jamaica. However, on June 15, 1748, the ship Hammon was aboard foundered not far from the shore of Cape Florida. The captain ordered the ship's crew to, in small groups, make for the shore in a boat. When half of the crew was ashore, they were attacked by a group of 60 indigenous Floridians, who captured and bound them. Then, after burning the ship and killing those still aboard, they returned and started killing those who were bound. Seeing his imminent death, Hammon attempted to escape by swimming away. Though this was unsuccessful, he was the only survivor of the crew. He was held captive by the indigenous Floridians and fed well.

Then a Spanish ship arrived from St. Augustine. Its captain made a deal with the indigenous Floridians, giving them 10 dollars for Hammon and persuading the indigenous Floridians not hereafter to kill any other persons but capture as many as they could and sell them to him for 10 dollars each.

== Life and incarceration in Cuba ==
After this venture, Hammon lived with Francisco Cajigal de la Vega, the governor of Cuba, in the castle. After about 12 months, he (and others) was accosted in the street by a "Press-Gang" and taken to jail. He spent a night in jail, then refused to work aboard a Spanish ship and was put in a dungeon, where he remained for almost five years. He petitioned prison visitors to communicate with the governor. This was unsuccessful until a Mrs. Betty Howard pleaded his case to a visiting Boston ship's captain who visited Hammon in his "deplorable Condition" and secured his release through the governor. Hammon returned to live with him in the castle for about a year.

== Attempts to escape ==
During his second period with the governor, Hammon attempted to escape three times. On his first try, he boarded a ship and spent the night concealed. When it departed, he revealed himself, but the captain turned the ship around and returned him to shore. He made his second attempt to escape, again trying to board a ship bound for Jamaica. He was, again, almost immediately sent back. Hammon was employed for seven months, along with quite a few other enslaved people, carrying Roman Catholic Bishop Pedro Augustín Morell de Santa Cruz on a litter through the country. He was then imprisoned for over four years for refusing to serve aboard a Spanish man-of-war.

Finally, in 1758, he and others were snuck aboard a British man-of-war by an English lieutenant.

== Reunited with Winslow ==
On his way to London, the ship he served aboard encountered and fought a French man-o-war. The French killed 70 of the British crew, and Hammon was wounded in the head and arm. Hammon stayed in Greenwich Hospital to recover from his wounds and was then discharged from the Royal Navy. After working again briefly, he became sick with a fever and was confined in London for six weeks. While ill, he exhausted his money and was left in an impoverished state. Hammon reunited with his owner John Winslow, who happened to be in London, after nearly 13 years. According to the narrative, both were delighted to be brought back together.
