= Horizon (British TV programme) =

British documentary television series

- Horizon title card
- Genre: Science, technology
- Starring: Various
- Narrated by: Paul Vaughan (1968–1995), Veronika Hyks, Phillip Tibenham, Martin Jarvis, Ian Holm, Sean Barrett, Richard Baker, Ray Brooks, Paul Daneman, William Franklyn, James Hazeldine, Bernard Hill, Roger Mills, Bill Paterson, Ronald Pickup, Tim Pigott-Smith, Michael Wisher Hugh Quarshie, Andrew Sachs, Robert Symes-Shutzmann, Peter France, (1983–1986), Peter Wilson, (c. 1980 – late 1990s), William Woollard, Dilly Barlow (2001)
- Country of origin: United Kingdom
- Original language: English
- No. of series: 57
- No. of episodes: >1,250 (list of episodes)

Production
- Producers: Liz Tucker; Andrew Thompson; Jacqui Smith; Andrew Cohen; Malcolm Clark; Matthew Barrett; Edward Briffa; Grenville Williams
- Running time: 59 min
- Production companies: BBC Television (1964–2015); BBC Studios Science Unit (2015–present); Wingspan Productions (2017–present); Windfall Films (2017–present) Science Channel

Original release
- Network: BBC Two
- Release: 2 May 1964 – present

Related
- Nova (American TV program)

Horizon is an ongoing and long-running British documentary television series on BBC Two that covers science and philosophy.

== History ==
The programme was first broadcast on 2 May 1964 with "The World of Buckminster Fuller", which explored the theories and structures of inventor Richard Buckminster Fuller and included the Horizon mission statement: "The aim of Horizon is to provide a platform from which some of the world's greatest scientists and philosophers can communicate their curiosity, observations and reflections, and infuse into our common knowledge their changing views of the universe". Horizon continues to be broadcast on BBC Two, and in 2009 added a series of films based on the rich Horizon archive, called Horizon Guides, on BBC Four.

In December 2016, it was announced that Horizon would no longer be made exclusively by the BBC's in-house production division, BBC Studios, and the BBC invited independent production companies to pitch to make episodes of the strand.

== Episodes ==
There have been 57 series and more than 1,200 episodes produced.

== Broad coverage of science topics ==
Horizon has investigated an eclectic mix of subjects and controversial topics. It opened the awareness of consumers to the use of whale meat in pet food in 1972 ("Whales, Dolphins, and Men"), and produced award-winning documentary-dramas such as Life Story in 1987, which dramatised the discovery of the structure of DNA. A 1978 programme about the silicon chip documented the decline of the Swiss watch industry. In 1993, an Emmy-winning episode about decreasing male fertility ("Assault on the Male") was given a special screening at the White House.

== Format ==
The format of the series has varied over the years.

=== 1960s–1980s ===
The first ever Horizon was "The World of Buckminster Fuller", produced and directed by Ramsay Short, and broadcast on 2 May 1964. It set the style; running time 50 minutes, no in-vision presenter, interviewees speaking off camera (in practice, almost always to the producer/director whose questions were usually edited out). Until the 1980s Horizon, in common with all BBC documentaries, was shot on 16 mm film. Only rare programmes had a specialist writer – in most cases the producer/director was also the writer.

The first Horizon in colour was "Koestler on Creativity", produced by Robert Vas, was shown on 5 December 1967.

The Public Broadcasting Service's (PBS) Nova series was created in 1974, after Michael Ambrosino, who had served a year-long fellowship with the BBC, was inspired to create an American program based on the same model.

=== 1990s ===
Since the early 1990s, Horizon has developed a distinctive narrative form, typically employing an underlying "detective" metaphor, to relate scientific issues and discoveries to the lives of its viewers. Many episodes of Horizon are structured in a format that starts with a tease or menu laying out what the show has in store, followed by two "acts" with a "plot twist" around 25–35 minutes into the show. The twist frequently propels the story line from a focus on an individual scientist's human and intellectual journey of discovery through to explore the impact of that insight while, at the same time, providing a change of "texture" and filmic pace. Often, episodes of Horizon end up with a montage of "talking heads" as experts and people affected by the implications of the science covered are intercut to create a sense of summary.

=== 2000s ===
Until early 2008, the length was standardised at 50 minutes, which was extended in the latter half of 2008 to 60 minutes. Some episodes are adapted from documentaries by other broadcasters such as PBS's Nova, and episodes of Horizon are in turn adapted by PBS (to American English) and other broadcasters around the world in their own languages.

No new episodes were broadcast between July 2022 and 2024. In January 2024, a special episode on the Artemis program in conjunction with the American series Nova and the Open University was announced.

== Popularity ==
Horizon has enjoyed high viewing figures, even though it covered subjects as complex as molecular biology and particle physics. It has shown a change of direction since June 2006, offering a more light-hearted approach, though the subjects it covers remain serious. For instance, an episode broadcast in 2019 entitled "We Need To Talk About Death" features Kevin Fong talking to palliative care clinician Mark Taubert and some of his patients who are facing terminal illness.

== Criticism ==
The down-side to Horizon's recent focus on "Pure Science, Sheer Drama" and the occasionally forced narrative this engenders has led to some accusations of dumbing down in recent years, with one former editor writing a newspaper article about how the programme concentrates too much on human stories, and not enough on the science.

One programme "Chimps are people too" was entirely presented by a non-scientist, Danny Wallace. Editor Andrew Cohen addressed the reasons why the programme went down this route on the Horizon web page.

In October 2014, a three-part special – "Cat Watch: the New Horizon Experiment" – was broadcast, following up on Horizon's 2013 "The Secret Life of the Cat". At the end of the first hour-long broadcast the findings of the experiment so-far were summarised on screen by presenter Liz Bonnin as: "Our cats can cope with change but you have to introduce them to it gently". Private Eye was critical of the scientific value of the programme saying: "By all means, if the BBC wants to, make a series called The Secret Life of Cats; but don't insult the history of television by branding it, however obliquely, as a Horizon".

== Awards ==
In the period of "Pure Science, Sheer Drama", Horizon won an unprecedented series of the world's top awards, including a BAFTA, an Emmy for Best Documentary, a Royal Television Society Award and a Grierson Trust Award. Other Emmy winning programmes are: "Chernobyl's Sarcophagus" (1991), "Assault on the Male" (1993) and "The Fall of the World Trade Centre" (2003). In 1988, Horizon won a BAFTA for Best Drama, "Life Story" (about the elucidation of the structure of DNA), another in 1996 for Best Documentary, "Fermat's Last Theorem" (which also won a Prix Italia) and another in 2001 for Best Factual Series or Strand.

== Home media ==
Three Horizon episodes were included on The Wonders Collection Special Edition DVD and Blu-ray. The episodes were "Do You Know What Time It Is?", "Can We Make A Star On Earth?" and "What on Earth is Wrong With Gravity?"

== See also ==
- Q.E.D. – 1980s and 1990s documentary series on BBC1, focusing on more populist science topics than Horizon
- Equinox – Channel 4 science programme, similar to Q.E.D. and last produced in 2001
- List of Horizon episodes
