= Slavery in British America =

Slavery in the British American colonies was an institution that was brought into existence by traders and operated from the cities of Bristol and Liverpool and was conducted within locations on the northern part of South America through the West Indies and on the North American mainland. Many colonies saw slavery ranging from as far south as the colony of British Guiana, Barbados, Jamaica, up to the Thirteen Colonies, and as far north as the colonies that became modern-day Canada. Slavery across every part of colonial America under British control was abolished in 1833.

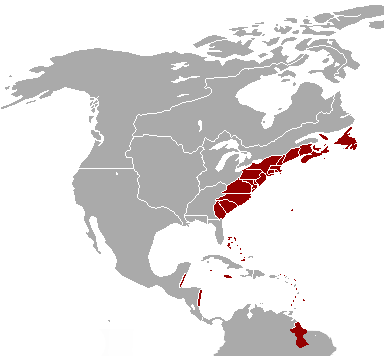
Map of the extent of slavery in colonial British America

== Background ==
Coat of arms of the Royal African Company, which traded slaves to colonies throughout the Americas. Jamaican plantations were a prime destination for slaves brought from Africa

According to The National Archives (United Kingdom), slavery was conducted as unfree labour in the British Caribbean and North American colonies from the 16th to 19th century. It is believed that the first British slave trader was Sir John Hawkins, having conducted voyages in the early 1560's while the first colony to use chattel slaves was Bermuda.

These colonies, several of which were captured during the Western Design expedition between 1654-1660, provided an abundance of raw materials such as tobacco and cotton. However for many decades the top producing domestic item was sugar with Jamaica as Britain's largest sugar-producing colony according to the University of Glasgow. According to the United Nations, chattel slavery saw its most "extreme form" with the passage of the Black Code which was initially introduced in Barbados and quickly spread to other colonies within the Americas.

Historian Eric Williams wrote extensively on the role of sugar and slavery in the Caribbean. The plantations on these colonies produced raw materials, merchants brought in goods from Africa such as gold and ivory, and trade saw products brought back to Europe in the triangle trade. As the use of slaves increased for sugar production on the islands in the West Indies a powerful interest group called the West India Interest promoted its expansion and defended its ongoing use in Parliament.

During this time period, Britannica notes, the Royal African Company was created and held a monopoly over the British Slave trade. Other historians have noted the strategic value of the sugar plantations specifically in relation to their value to the mercantile system for bringing in money to the government for fighting its wars against Spain and France, pointing out King George III's summation of the situation that "Our islands must be defended even at the risk of an invasion of this island. If we lose our sugar islands, it will be impossible to raise money to continue the war and then no peace can be obtained but such a one as He that gave one to Europe in 1763 never can subscribe to."

The University College London Centre for the Study of the Legacies of British Slavery provides maps of where plantations were built on the colonies of Grenada, Jamaica, and Barbados. At the time Somerset v Stewart was concluded in 1772 there were nearly 30 colonies engaging in the enslavement of Africans, and while slavery in England was definitively struck down "the impairment to the legal status of slavery in the realm of England did not extend to the colonies." According to historian Robin Winks, after the American Revolution, "loyalist" slave owners who were being treated poorly by "patriot" Americans retained ownership of their slaves when they re-located to British Canada where slavery was still legal until 1833.

Slavery was also present in Guyana, though mostly under Dutch rule. When Britain established Guyana as a British colony in 1815, slavery continued as it had before. At one time, Guyana was one of the wealthiest of Britain's sugar colonies. Slavery was abolished in Guyana in 1833.

According to the Voyages: The Trans-Atlantic Slave Trade Database, the British Empire was the second most involved country, only being surpassed by the Portuguese Empire. The estimated number of people transported across the Atlantic on ships according to the Voyages database is 3,259,443. One reason why the British Empire shipped such an enormous amount of slaves was because of the Treaty of Utrecht in 1713, where Britain secured the Asiento de Negros, a monopoly over the trading of slaves to plantations in Spanish America. This monopoly over slave trading led to tensions between Spain and Britain with their contract and the fees for providing slave transportation which led to the War of Jenkins' Ear. According to historian Peter Silver, the Asiento and the War of Jenkins' Ear had a profound impact on slavery in [British] America.

== Legacy ==
As noted by the BBC, Britain's about-face from being involved with the slave trade and having colonies that engaged in the practice of slavery to campaigning aggressively to end it presents a glorious humanitarian crusade for the ages. However, any retrospective upon and congratulations on the subject must carry a sobering awareness not just of the event and what followed. Prior to abolishing of both the trade and then slavery itself within its many colonial possessions, Britain was "the pre-eminent slave trading nation during the 18th century."

The Guardian writes that slavery during British rule sometimes gets discarded, saying that "Many of us today have a more vivid image of American slavery than we have of life as it was for British-owned slaves on the plantations of the Caribbean. The word slavery is more likely to conjure up images of Alabama cotton fields and whitewashed plantation houses, of Roots, Gone With The Wind and 12 Years A Slave, than images of Jamaica or Barbados in the 18th century."

== Bibliography ==
- Wilberforce, William (1823). An Appeal to the Religion, Justice, and Humanity of the Inhabitants of the British Empire, in behalf of the Negro Slaves in the West Indies.
- Viotti da Costa, Emília (1997). Crowns of Glory, Tears of Blood - The Demerara Slave Rebellion of 1823. Oxford University Press.
- Olusoga, David (2016). Black and British: A Forgotten History. Pan Macmillan.
- Handler, Jerome (1978). Plantation Slavery in Barbados - An Archaeological and Historical Investigation. Harvard University Press.
- Campbell, Xaiver (2023). Black Harbour: Slavery and the Forgotten Histories of Black People in Newfoundland and Labrador. Boulder Books.
- Winks, Robin (1971). The Blacks in Canada - A History. Queen's University Press.
- Buckner, Phillip Alfred (2008). Canada and the British Empire. Oxford University Press.
- Ragatz, Lowell Joseph (1928). The Fall of the Planter Class in the British Caribbean, 1763-1833. the University of Michigan.
- Bernhard, Virginia (1999). Slaves and Slaveholders in Bermuda, 1616-1782. University of Missouri Press.
- Bernhard, Virginia (2011). A Tale of Two Colonies - What Really Happened in Virginia and Bermuda?. University of Missouri Press.
- Beckles, Hilary (2016). The First Black Slave Society - Britain's "barbarity Time" in Barbados, 1636-1876. University of the West Indies Press.
- Morgan, Kenneth (2007). Slavery and the British Empire - From Africa to America. Oxford University Press.
- Solow, Barbara (1987). British Capitalism and Caribbean Slavery - The Legacy of Eric Williams. Cambridge University Press.
- Bickell, Richard (1825). The West Indies as they are. London, J. Hatchard & son.

== See also ==
- Slavery Abolition Act 1833
- Slavery in New France
- Slavery in New Spain
- Slavery in colonial Spanish America
- British pro-slavery movement
- Expulsion of the Loyalists
