= Now the Chips Are Down =

- Horizon episode
- Episode no.: Series 14; Episode 17
- Original air date: 31 March 1978

"Now the Chips Are Down" is a 1978 British television documentary episode about the importance and influence of microprocessors within the UK economy. Aired by the BBC as part of its Horizon series, it was produced by BBC Television and narrated by British radio and television presenter Paul Vaughan.

The documentary is a report on the "applications and implications" of microprocessors to employment within the British economy. Science historian Robert M. Young wrote in 1981 that the programme played an "important part" in raising awareness about microprocessors within government and the general public.

== Consequences ==
Britain's lagging place in the worldwide technology race was widely acknowledged after the documentary was screened. The UK government launched the Microelectronics Education Programme in 1981, with a budget of more than £10 million. This included nationwide discounts on computers to schools and colleges, and was followed by government backing of the BBC's Computer Literacy Project. Funding for related education schemes continued until 1988.
