= Miami Circle =

Archaeological site in Brickell, Miami

- The Miami Circle at Brickell Point Site
- U.S. National Register of Historic Places
- U.S. National Historic Landmark
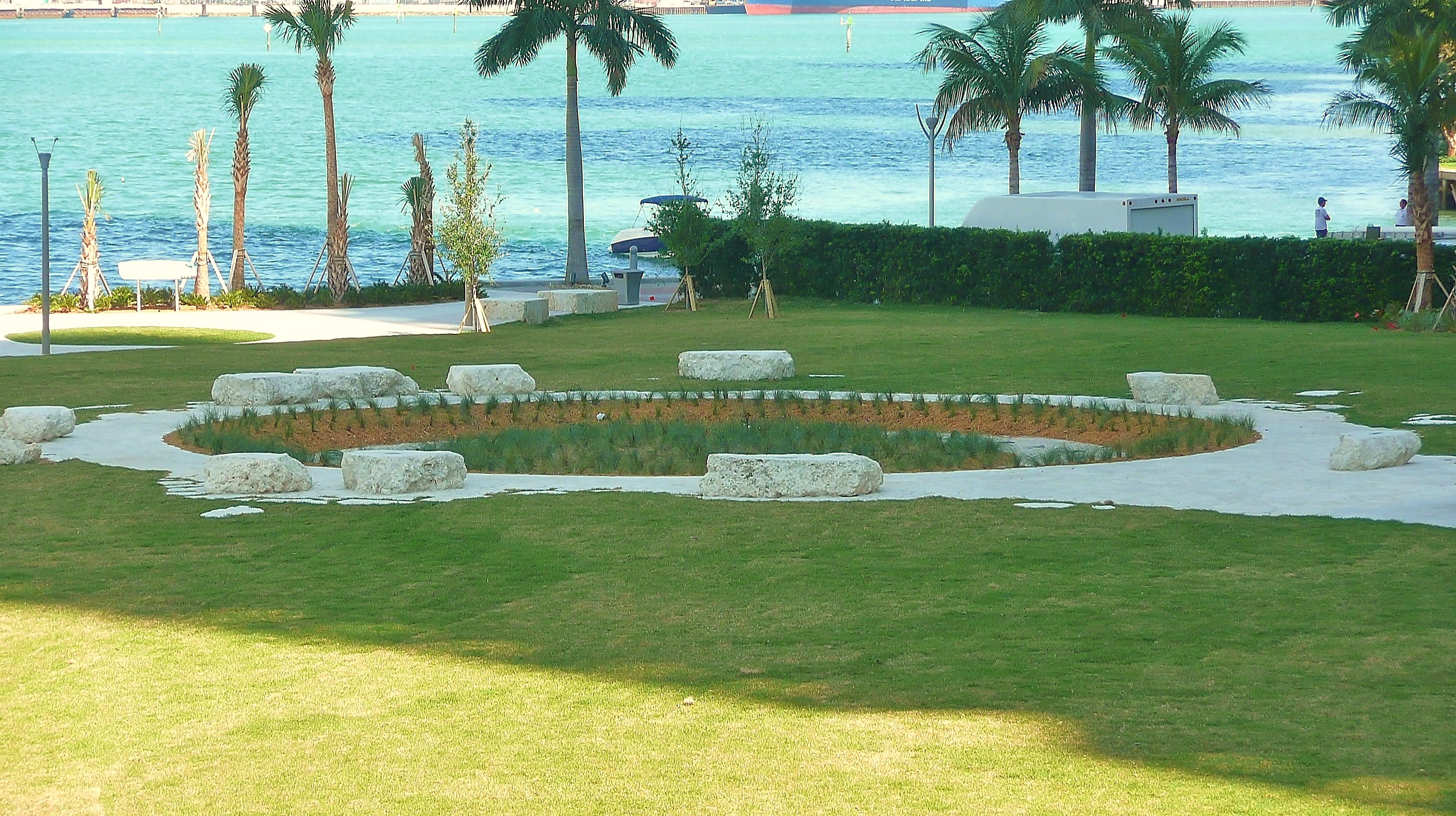
- Miami Circle Park, 7 March 2011

- Location within Miami Location within Florida Location within the United States
- Location: Miami, Florida
- Coordinates: 25°46′10.0914″N 80°11′20.2596″W
- Built: 500 BC – AD 900
- NRHP reference No.: 01001534

Significant dates
- Added to NRHP: February 5, 2002
- Designated NHL: January 16, 2009

The Miami Circle, also known as The Miami River Circle, Brickell Point, or The Miami Circle at Brickell Point Site, is an archaeological site in Brickell, Miami, Florida. It consists of a perfect circle measuring 38 feet (11.5m) of 600 postmolds that contain 24 holes or basins cut into the limestone bedrock, on a coastal spit of land, surrounded by a large number of other 'minor' holes. It predates other known permanent settlements on the East Coast. It is believed to have been the location of a structure, built by the Tequesta (also Tekesta) Indians, in what was possibly their capital. Discovered in 1998, the site is believed to be somewhere between 1,700 and 2,700 years old.

On February 5, 2002, the site was listed on the National Register of Historic Places. It was declared a National Historic Landmark on January 16, 2009.

On February 3, 2014, the Miami Herald reported additional postholes had been excavated in Downtown Miami, further indicating presence of ancient habitation.

The state bought the 2.5-acre site for $26.7 million to save the valuable historical artifact. Because of the fragility of the artifact, it was buried again beneath layers of limestone, rather than putting it on display.

== History ==
The site of 401 Brickell Avenue, named after William Brickell, co-founder of Miami in the 1870s, held an apartment complex until 1998. Property developer Michael Baumann purchased the site for $8.5 million to build a luxury condominium, and in July 1998 tore down the standing apartment complex. According to City of Miami historic preservation code requirements, he was obliged to commission a routine archaeological field survey of the site prior to commencement of building, but this didn't occur until Bob Carr, then Director of the Miami-Dade County Historic Preservation Division, pressed the issue with the City and Baumann. The Miami-Dade Historic Preservation Division, along with volunteers and employees of the Archaeological & Historical Conservancy, conducted the salvage excavation of the site.

In the course of the exploration, the team discovered a number of holes cut into the Oolitic limestone bedrock. On examining the layout of the holes, the land surveyor postulated that they were part of a circle 38 feet (12 m) in diameter. Having calculated the center, he projected the likely location of the remaining holes. Excavation revealed that there were 24 holes forming a perfect circle in the limestone. Examination of the earth revealed numerous archeological artifacts, ranging from shell-tools and stone axe-heads to human teeth and charcoal from fires.

The developer Baumann offered to pay to relocate the circle to another site for preservation, an idea that former mayor and current City Commissioner Joe Carollo supported. Public opposition grew, concerned that the removal could potentially destroy one of the most archaeologically significant finds in North America. The Elizabeth Ordway Dunn Foundation made a donation of $25,000 to fund further exploration of the site, which continued until February 1999.

Following issuance of building permits by the City of Miami during the last week of January 1999, the Dade Heritage Trust (Miami-Dade County's largest historic preservation organization) filed a lawsuit on January 31, 1999, seeking an injunction against further construction on site. The Trust filed the suit and arranged for an emergency hearing at the home of Circuit Court Judge Thomas Wilson. The basis for the lawsuit was that the developer had not obtained required approval in the form of a certificate of appropriateness from the City of Miami's Historic and Environmental Preservation Board. At the hearing, the developer and the city were represented by counsel. Following arguments and Dade Heritage Trust's admission that it was not prepared to post a bond to support the injunction request, the Judge denied the motion for temporary injunction. Baumann agreed to postpone construction on the site for thirty days while the archaeologists finished their work.

County Mayor for Miami-Dade Alex Penelas and others interested in saving the Circle, asked the County Commission to file a lawsuit to take ownership of the property. The Commission approved such action on February 18, and Judge Richard Feder ordered a temporary injunction against building on the site. Baumann agreed to sell, but asked for $50 million, a price which he eventually lowered to $26.7 million. In an unprecedented move, the State of Florida Preservation 2000 land acquisition program purchased the site from Baumann for that sum in November 1999, using both state funds and donations from various foundations and private citizens. The state considered creating a 3-D replica of the buried circle so that visitors could envision what the 2,000-year-old circle looked like.

The "Brickell Point Site" was listed on the National Register of Historic Places on February 5, 2002.

== Archaeology ==
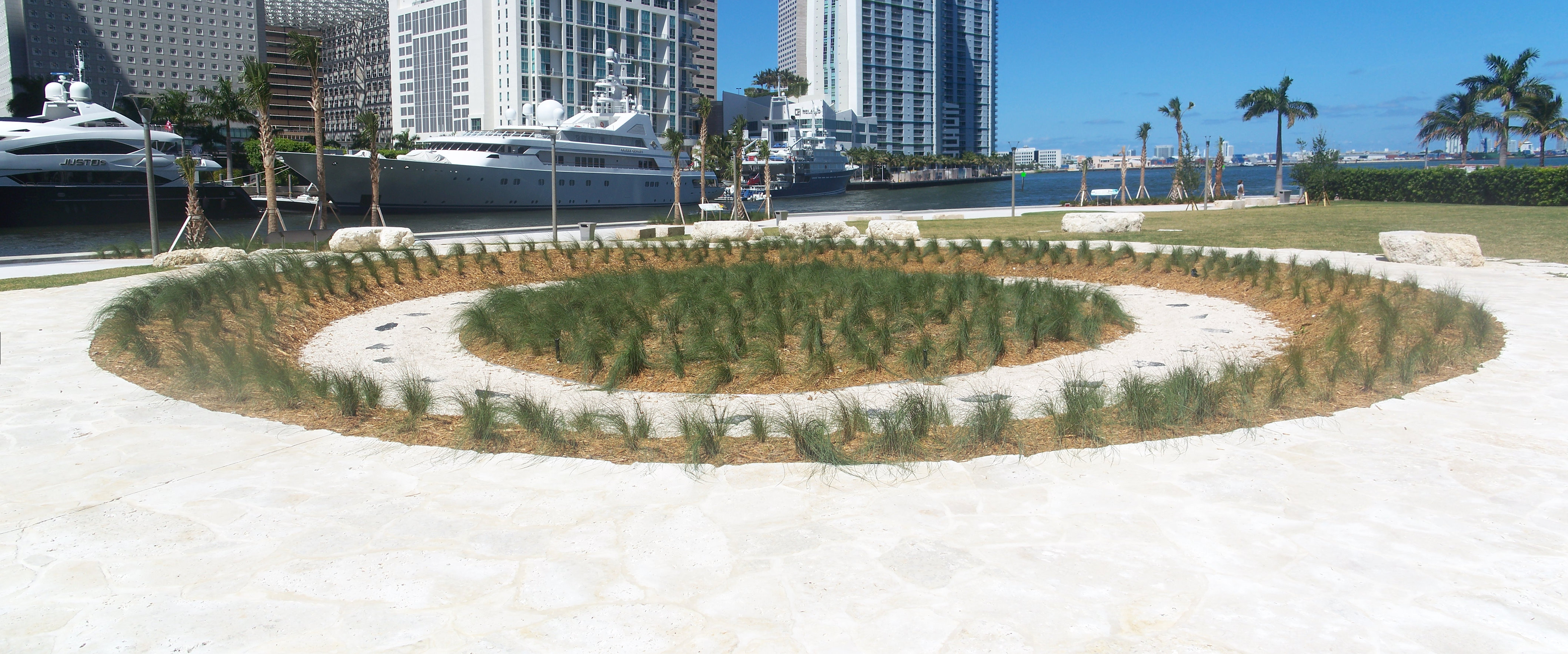
The circle, April 2011

Artifacts recovered from the Miami Circle site are stored and on display at HistoryMiami. It is the official repository for all archaeological materials recovered in Miami-Dade County.

=== Age ===
In order to date the site, pieces of burnt wood were sent in March 1999 for radiocarbon dating by John Ricisak, a specialist in the County Historic Preservation department. The results were a surprise, indicating that the wood was between 1,800 and 2,000 years old. Some scholars, most notably Dr. Jerald Milanich, doubted that the circle was as old as the wood. Further evidence to support the theory that the holes were of that age comes from Tom Scott and Harley Means of the Florida Geological Survey, who point to the buildup of a calcite "duricrust" on the edge of the cut face. Though this is an extremely imprecise way to date the holes, it rules out that they were of modern origin.

=== Origin ===
Initial theories on the origin of the site by many members of the public were that it was created by the Olmec or Mayan civilizations. No evidence was found of any artifacts of Central American origin, however. Further examination of the artifacts found at the site, particularly the shell tools, shark teeth, and other items of aquatic origin, showed that they matched perfectly with artifacts known to be from a local tribe, the historic Tequesta.

The Tequesta were a tribe who were believed to be primarily nomadic, hunting fish and alligators in the Florida Everglades. They were considered aggressive as they killed many early European explorers who attempted landfall in Florida. The Tequesta, like many other Native Americans, succumbed to the new infectious diseases brought by European colonists, as well as were disrupted by warfare.

=== Purpose ===
Randolph Widmer of the University of Houston suggested holes were postholes for some kind of structure, probably a cone-shaped building with a hole in the top. These sorts of structures were known to have existed in the Eastern United States, yet none was thought to have had such a permanent base as the Miami Circle. Critics of this theory pointed out that there was no evidence of fire on the bedrock as is usually found in the remains of this type of buildings. Widmer's response was that, given the weather common across Florida and resulting flooding, the early people may have raised the structure on stilts. This theory also suggested that the seemingly random array of holes could have been for support posts. They appear in clusters perhaps due to the necessity to replace them as the wood rotted.

Researchers next tried to determine the purpose of the structure. Two obvious candidates are living quarters, or a ceremonial building of some sort. The lack of evidence for the former began to suggest the latter, and further evidence can be put forward to support the theory. Firstly the effort necessary to create such a structure would involve considerable teamwork, particularly given the lack of tools. This sort of teamwork is often seen in the construction of religious buildings.

Secondly, there were certain anomalies in the artifacts discovered. Many 'common' Tequesta relics were found at the site—tools and perhaps decorative items made from shells and other aquatic materials like sharks' teeth—but there were a few pieces discovered that did not fit. The main items were two basalt axe heads. These axes would have been a particularly sought after item on the southern Florida coast due to the lack of any equivalent hard stone in the area, yet these axe heads are completely untouched. Further analysis of the stone by Dr. Jacqueline Dixon, University of Miami, found that the basalt was likely from the region of Macon, Georgia, some 600 miles (970 km) away. Additional items that may have been placed in, or buried under the structure were a complete 5-foot (1.5 m) long shark skeleton, aligned east to west, a dolphin skull, and a complete carapace of a sea-turtle. Four human teeth were also found, though no other evidence pointed to its being a burial site.

=== Former septic tank ===
University of Florida archaeologist Jerald Milanich was concerned that the circle were the remains of a drain field from an old septic tank that was aligned perfectly at the edge of the circle. He suggested that the circle could be nothing more than a sink for the sewage from the septic tank and suggested additional measures be taken to rule out this theory.

In attempting to refute this claim, Ricicek pointed to two things. Firstly there was clearly a terracotta outflow from the tank that would not tie with the need for a sink, and the plans for the apartment complex clearly show a sewage outflow to the south, into the river. Secondly, returning to the analysis of the calcite buildup on the holes by the Florida Geological Survey, the bedrock that had been cut out to lay the tank had little or no duricrust, showing the considerable age difference between the septic tank construction and the Circle.

== Miami Circle Park ==
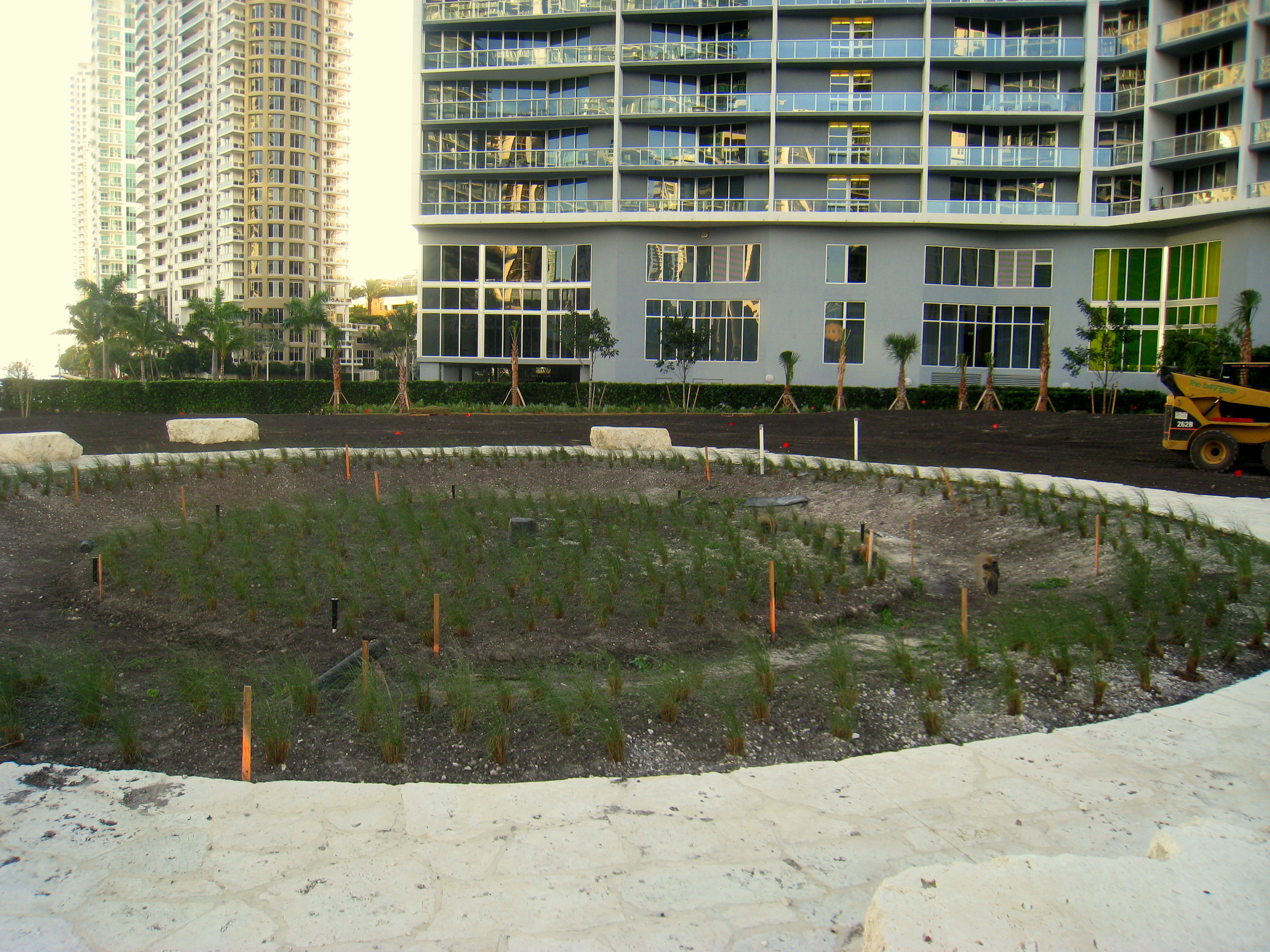
Miami Circle Park, December 2010

HistoryMiami, then known as the Historical Museum of Southern Florida, signed a 44-year lease of the site in March 2008.

A waterfront park managed by HistoryMiami opened in 2011. The circle itself remains buried to protect it, while an audio tour and several panels describing it are available.

== See also ==
- Pompano Beach Mound: another Tequesta archaeological site
