= Crystal River Archaeological State Park =

State park in Florida, United States

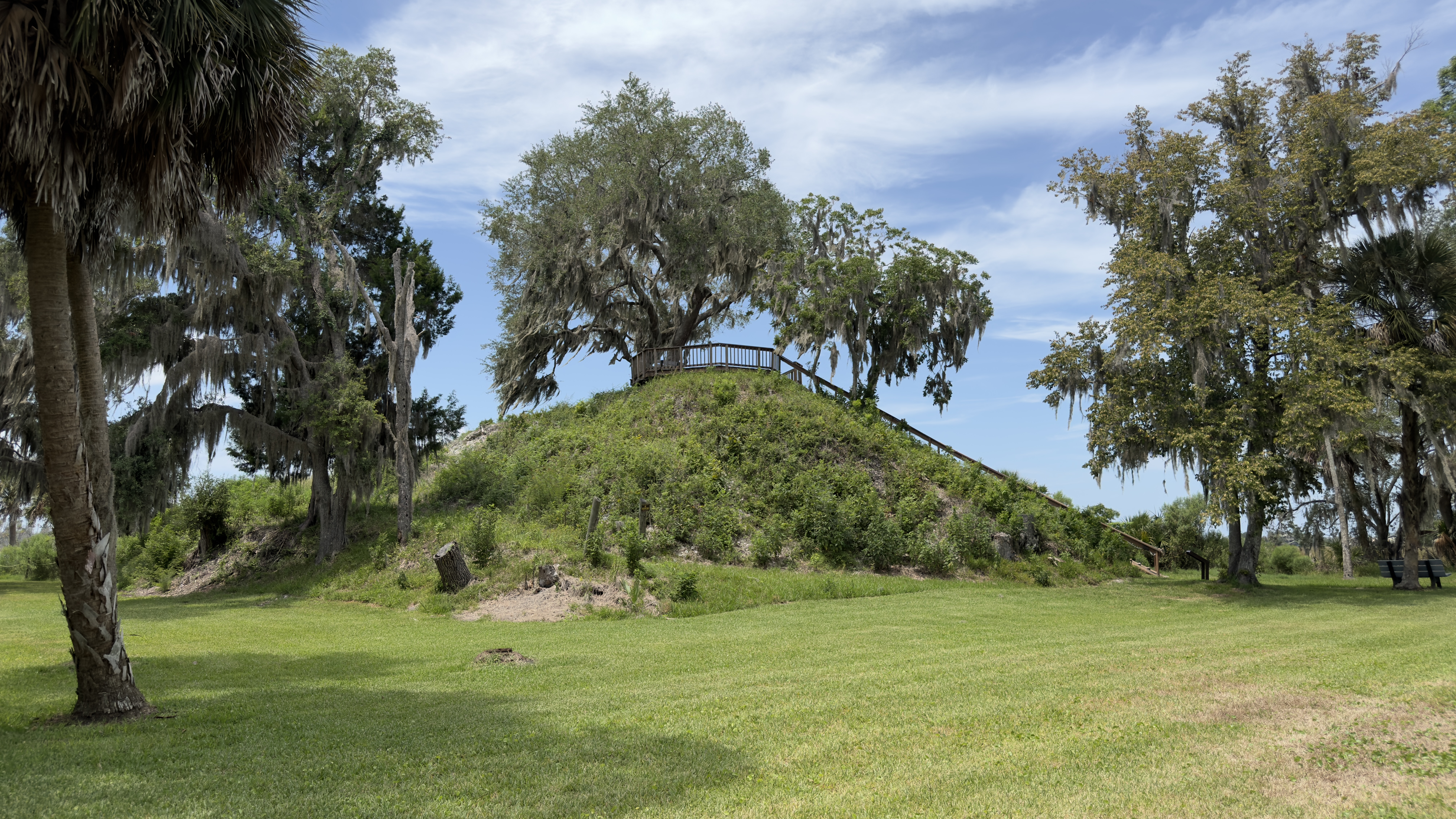
- Mound A, the largest earthwork at the site

- Location within Florida Location within the United States
- Interactive map of Crystal River Archaeological State Park
- Location: Citrus County, Florida, U.S.
- Nearest city: Crystal River, Florida
- Coordinates: 28°54′33″N 82°37′43″W
- Area: 61.48 acres (24.88 ha)
- Established: August 6, 1962
- Visitors: 42,719 (in Fiscal year 2022–23)
- Governing body: Florida Department of Environmental Protection
- Crystal River Site
- U.S. National Register of Historic Places
- U.S. National Historic Landmark
- Area: 17.5 acres (7.1 ha)
- NRHP reference No.: 70000178

Significant dates
- Added to NRHP: 29 September 1970
- Designated NHL: 21 June 1990

Crystal River Archaeological State Park is a 61-acre (25 ha) Florida state park in Citrus County that preserves the Crystal River Site, a pre-Columbian mound complex, and the related Roberts Island complex downstream. The site is recorded in the Florida Master Site File, the state's inventory of historical resources, under the Smithsonian trinomial 8CI1. The park occupies a low bluff on the north bank of the Crystal River, about 1.9 miles (3 km) above the river's mouth on the Gulf of Mexico. Its mainland parcel is nearly surrounded by the separate Crystal River Preserve State Park, and the two parks are administered together.

The mound complex on the park's main parcel includes a stepped platform mound about 26 feet (8 m) tall (Mound A); two smaller flat-topped platform mounds (H and K); an irregular shell mound (J); a circular earthen embankment enclosing three smaller mounds, among them a central sand burial mound (the Main Burial Complex, Mounds C through F); a separate burial mound (G); a long crescent-shaped ridge of discarded shell (midden, Mound B); and three limestone "stelae", one carved with a low-relief human figure and another reportedly incised with a hand design. Radiocarbon dates analyzed by Thomas J. Pluckhahn and Victor D. Thompson show that substantive use of the site began by the second century AD and continued through the late Weeden Island period. Activity at the main complex declined by around 1050 as ceremonial life shifted downstream to Roberts Island, where mound-building and occupation continued until the complex was largely depopulated around 1233.

Professional investigation began with Clarence B. Moore in 1903, whose excavations in the Main Burial Complex gave the mounds their letter designations and recovered copper panpipes and ornaments, sheets of mica, quartz crystals, and marine-shell objects that pointed to long-distance trade. Ripley P. Bullen carried out the first systematic modern investigations in the 1950s and 1960s, adding Mounds J and K to the site map and documenting two of the stelae uncovered as the property was cleared for the park in 1964. William H. Sears's 1962 paper tied the site to the Hopewell interaction sphere of the Ohio River Valley and cast it as primarily a burial center, a view that shaped research for decades. A reinvestigation by Pluckhahn and Thompson, published in 2018, revised the chronology and recast Crystal River as a long-occupied village and ceremonial center within a wide network of regional exchange.

The site was added to the National Register of Historic Places on September 29, 1970, and designated a National Historic Landmark under the official name Crystal River Site on June 21, 1990. The Roberts Island complex, approximately 0.31 miles (0.5 km) downstream on the Crystal River, was added to the park in 1996. A visitor center and museum near the entrance interprets the site and displays artifacts recovered during excavations, and a paved interpretive trail runs through the main mound complex. Beyond the earthworks themselves, the park protects shell mound, hydric hammock, and salt marsh communities typical of Florida's central Gulf Coast, and is a designated site on the western section of the Great Florida Birding and Wildlife Trail.

== Name ==
The park's current official designation is Crystal River Archaeological State Park. It was originally established in 1962 as Crystal River State Archaeological Site under the Florida Park Service; the current form of the name reflects the subsequent reclassification of Florida's state archaeological sites as archaeological state parks. The site's official designation on the National Register of Historic Places and under the National Historic Landmarks program is Crystal River Site. The site is also widely known as the Crystal River Mounds or Crystal River Indian Mounds. Under the Florida Master Site File the site carries the trinomial designation 8CI1.

== History ==
=== Before the park ===
The earliest known written description of the Crystal River mounds comes from D. G. Brinton's 1859 account of Mound A. By the time Clarence B. Moore arrived in 1903, the great shell mound was well known locally, but the sand burial mound at the center of the Main Burial Complex was unknown even to the landowner and showed no sign of earlier digging. The property was owned at the time by R. J. Knight of Crystal River, a naval-stores manufacturer and partial owner of the Crystal River Lumber Company. Moore was allowed to work at the site in 1903, 1906, and 1918, each time with Knight's permission. By 1918, he noted the owners as Mr. and Mrs. Robert J. Knight of Safety Harbor.

Bulldozing and the removal of shell for fill damaged the mounds directly in the mid-twentieth century. When John Goggin visited in 1951, the lower part of Mound A had been partly bulldozed, and in 1960, Ripley P. Bullen found that the landowner had recently removed the mound's ramp. Shell from the deposits was used for road building and fill material.

=== State acquisition and expansion ===
Glass viewing window into a Precolumbian burial at Mound C (Note: The sign on right reads: "Flexed Burial of the Weedon Island Period, A.D. 900.")

In response, Bullen began discussions with the landowners about acquisition by the state. On August 6, 1962, the Florida Board of Parks and Historic Memorials accepted a donation of 14.5 acres (5.9 ha) from S. M. and E. A. Whitcraft as well as G. C. and I. Dyer, on condition that the land be used only for public park purposes. (Note: Crystal River is often described as the first state archaeological site in the Florida park system. Earlier archaeological properties had entered the system under other classifications: the Madira Bickel Mound, conveyed in 1948, was the first archaeological site brought into the state park system, and appears among the system's historic monuments and memorials in the early 1950s.) (Note: Pluckhahn and Thompson give the tract as 18 acres (7.3 ha).) The land tract took in all of the major mounds except a large part of Mound A, which stayed in private hands. Former owner George Dyer pressed for a museum, and the Florida State Museum began planning exhibits in 1964 with Bullen's advice. In March 1964, construction for the museum exposed two of the stelae.

The museum, designed by Dan P. Branch and David Reaves of Gainesville with the Division's staff architect Warren Dixon, opened in 1965. Its first exhibits included an in situ display of burials Bullen had excavated in Mound C, later removed out of respect for Native American communities. Title passed to the Board of Trustees of the Internal Improvement Trust Fund, the state body that holds Florida's public lands, in September 1967, and in January 1968 the trustees leased the park to the state park agency.

=== Mound A and the White tract ===
The privately held part of Mound A was partially destroyed. By 1964, as much as two-thirds of its eastern portion had been removed for fill. Around 1965, Ouida and Theron White bought the land to build a trailer park beside the museum. Mound material on the parcel was spread out to level the grounds for mobile homes. The state bought what remained of the private part of Mound A from the Whites in the early 1970s. The mobile home park operated until the 1993 Storm of the Century wrecked it, and federal regulations barred rebuilding in the flood-prone area. The storm also spawned a tornado whose falling trees damaged several of the mounds. The state acquired the rest of the White property afterward, (Note: Pluckhahn and Thompson date the deed from Ouida White to 1996; the 2008 unit management plan gives 1997.) and most remains of the trailer park were removed in 2000.

=== Designations and later additions ===
The site was added to the National Register of Historic Places on September 29, 1970. On June 21, 1990, the site was designated a National Historic Landmark under the official name Crystal River Site. The designated landmark boundary covers 17.5 acres (7.1 ha), much less than the park's current 61 acres (25 ha) extent, and only includes the mound complex proper. In 1996, the Roberts Island complex of mounds and middens, about 0.31 miles (0.5 km) downstream, was added to the park. Recent work at the main park has included a new interpretive video for the visitor center, rebuilt accessible pathways, and repairs to the riverfront seawall with a small section of living shoreline.

== Archaeology ==
=== Research history ===
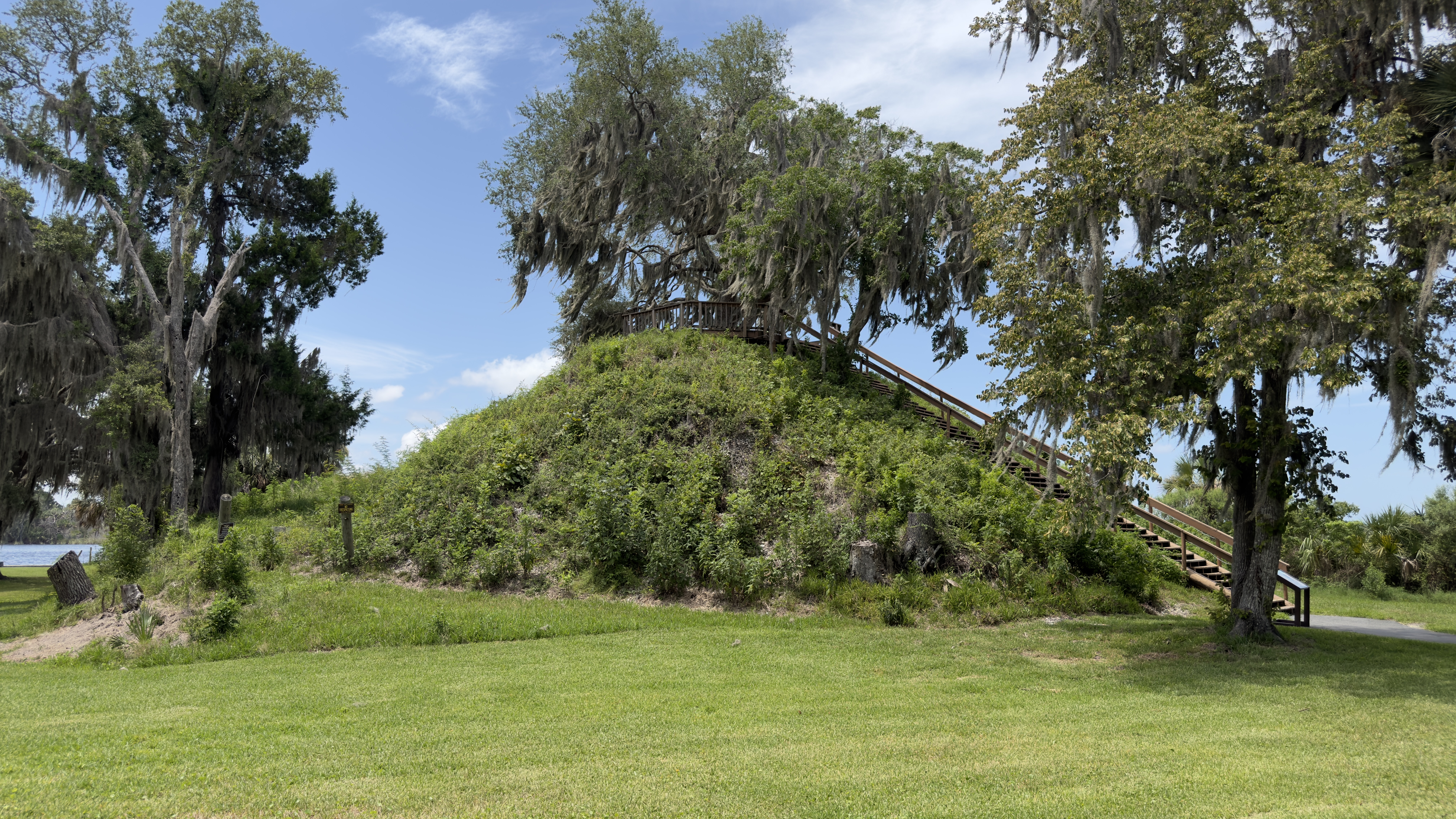
Mound A seen from the interpretive trail

The Crystal River mound complex was first described in the archaeological literature by D. G. Brinton in 1859, in what appears to be the earliest known written account of Mound A. Professional investigation began with Clarence B. Moore, who visited the site in three field seasons (1903, 1906, and 1918) aboard the steamer Gopher during his surveys of Florida's Gulf Coast rivers. Moore's 1903 excavation focused on the Main Burial Complex (Mounds C–F), particularly the central sand mound (Mound F), and recovered a substantial assemblage of copper artifacts, shell ornaments, mica, and other exotic materials that would anchor subsequent debate over the site's Hopewellian connections; his 1906 season addressed Mound E, and his 1918 return concentrated on the Mound C embankment. Moore's 1903 map assigned the letter designations for Mounds A through H that remain in use today. Moore's Crystal River material was transferred with the rest of his Florida Gulf Coast collection to the Museum of the American Indian, Heye Foundation in New York, including finds from the nearby Greenleaf Place mound and from an irregular mound about 1 mile (1.6 km) north of the main complex.

More than three decades passed after Moore's final season before excavation resumed, but the site did not drop out of view. The botanist John K. Small toured Crystal River in 1924, describing Mound A along with the smaller mounds and an associated village site. In 1938, Emerson Greenman pointed out resemblances between the artifacts Moore had recovered and material from Hopewell sites in Ohio. Gordon Willey's 1949 synthesis of Florida Gulf Coast archaeology assigned the site's pottery to the Deptford, Santa Rosa–Swift Creek, and Weeden Island complexes; Willey visited briefly that same year with Antonio Waring Jr. and Rufus Nightingale to make a surface collection from Mounds C and F.

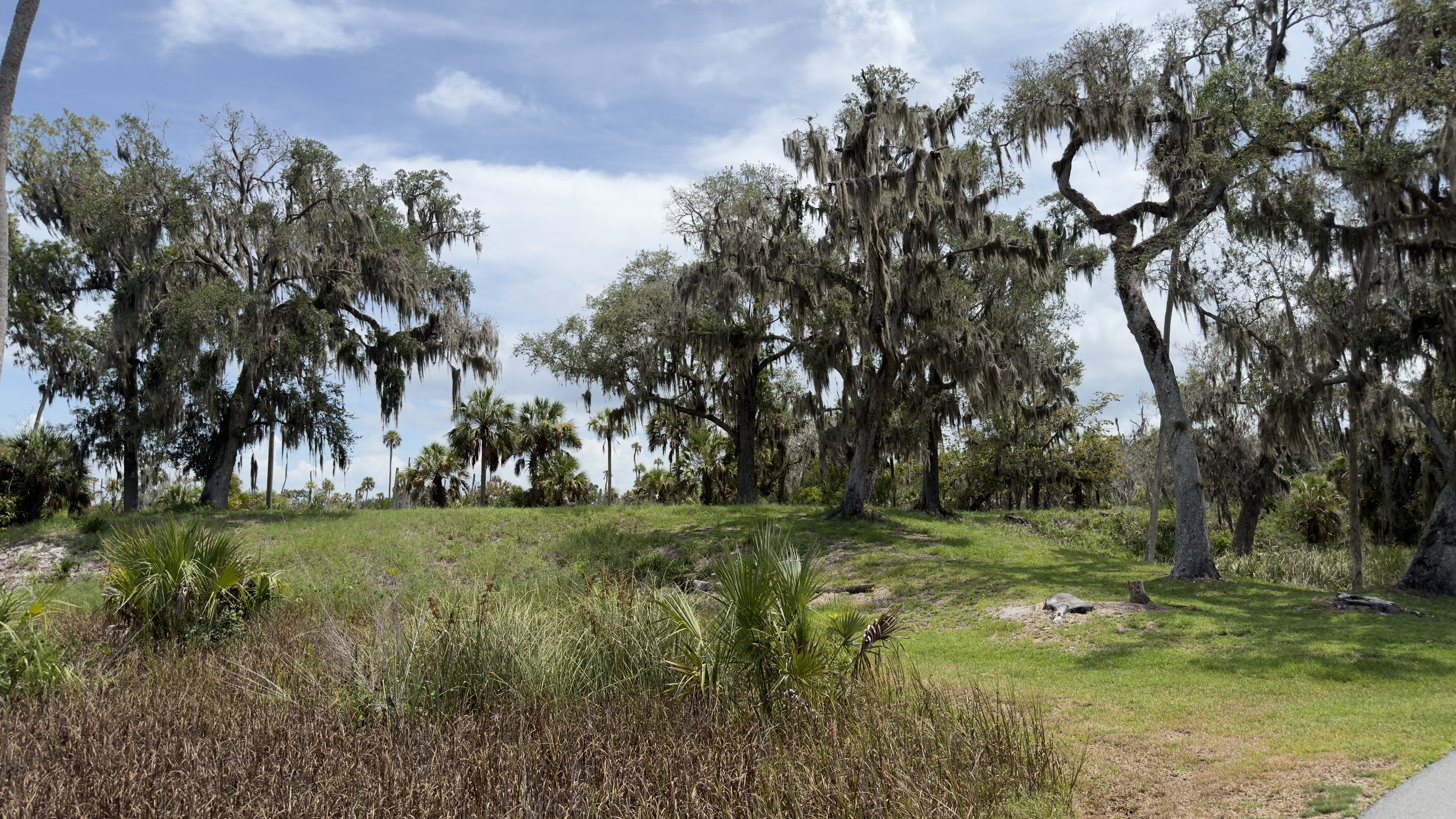
Mound H, the platform mound bounding the north side of the plaza

Sustained modern investigation resumed in February 1951 with Hale G. Smith's small-scale testing of Mounds A, B, C, E, and H, and continued in June of the same year when Bullen began the first of several field seasons at the site. Bullen's 1951 stratigraphic excavations in the shell midden (Mound B) supported a three-part occupation sequence spanning Santa Rosa–Swift Creek, Weeden Island, and late Weeden Island or Safety Harbor. Bullen returned in 1960 for an extensive campaign of topographic remapping that identified two previously unrecorded mounds, designated Mound J (an irregular shell mound) and Mound K (a small flat-topped platform), as well as an extension of the midden ridge northward beyond Mound A; a trench in Mound G identified 35 burials, and Bullen also identified undisturbed burials in the Mound F platform and the Mound C embankment. Two upright limestone slabs (Stelae 1 and 2) were discovered in March 1964 as the property was being cleared for the state park, and a third inscribed stone was later reported after being displaced by museum construction.

William H. Sears's 1962 paper first articulated the Hopewell interpretation of the site. Brent Weisman's 1995 monograph in the Florida Archaeology series synthesized the accumulated record and remained the standard treatment of the complex until the following decade. Beginning in 2008, Thomas J. Pluckhahn of the University of South Florida and Victor D. Thompson of the University of Georgia conducted a multi-year reinvestigation of both the main complex and Roberts Island under the Crystal River Early Village Archaeological Project (CREVAP), combining topographic mapping, ground-penetrating radar, electrical-resistance survey, coring with a hydraulic GeoProbe device, targeted trench excavation, and an expanded program of radiocarbon and optically stimulated luminescence dating. Their 2018 monograph New Histories of Village Life at Crystal River substantially revised the received chronology and reframed the site as a long-occupied village and ceremonial complex rather than a purely mortuary center.

=== Mound complex ===
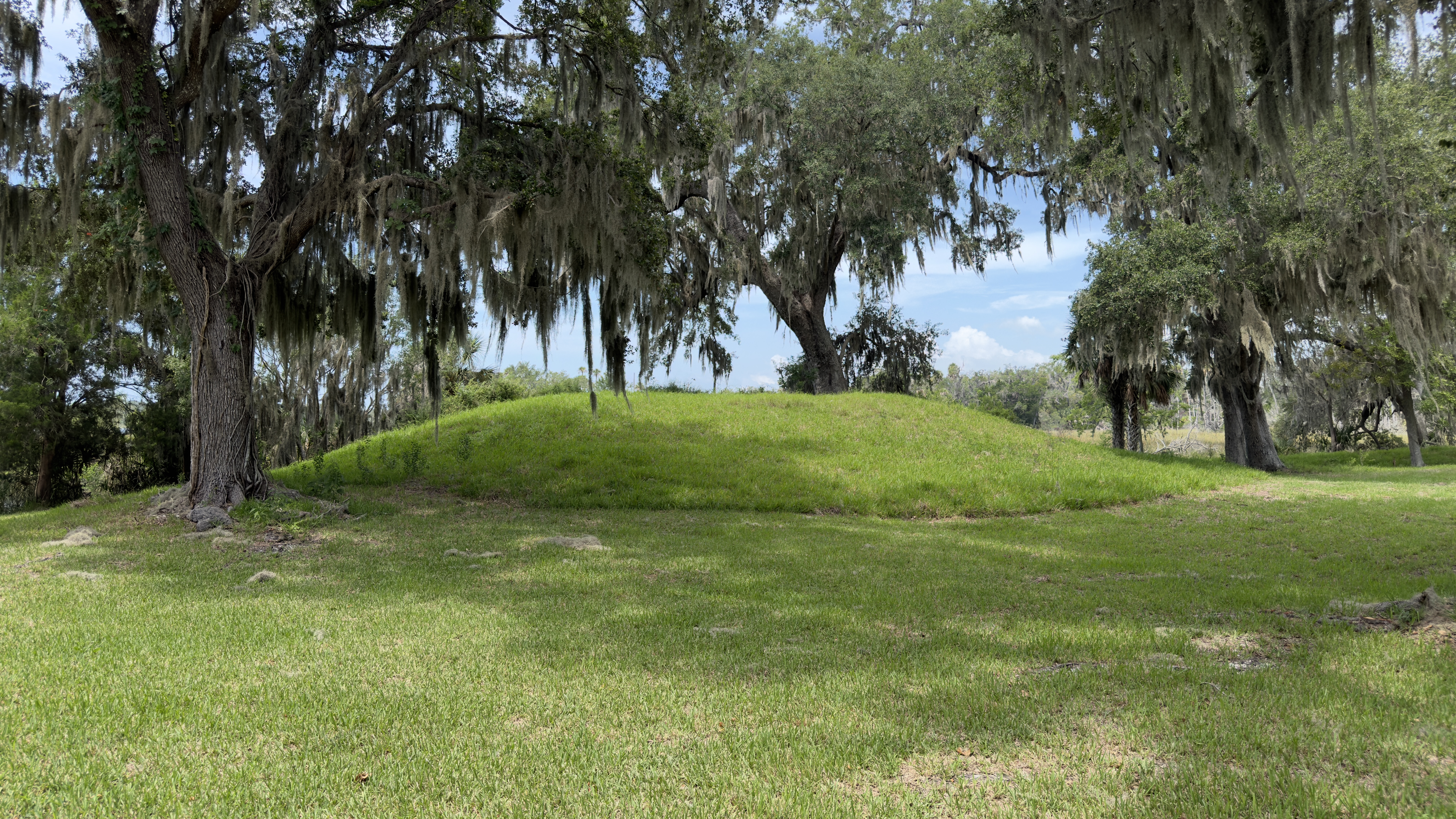
Mound K, one of two mounds added to the site inventory during Bullen's 1960 remapping

The Crystal River archaeological site (Florida Master Site File designation 8CI1) occupies a low bluff on the north bank of the Crystal River approximately 1.9 miles (3 km) above its mouth on the Gulf of Mexico, roughly halfway between the river's source at Kings Bay and its mouth at Crystal Bay. The complex comprises a stepped platform mound, several smaller flat-topped platforms, a circular burial embankment enclosing three smaller mounds, a discrete burial mound, an extensive shell midden ridge fronting the river, and three upright limestone "stelae"; individual features and their modeled construction dates are summarized in the table below. The letter designations Mounds A–H originate in Moore's 1903 map and remain in use; Mounds J and K were added during Bullen's 1960 topographic remapping. The Florida Master Site File records the site's extent as 27.6 acres (111,600 m^{2}), with cultural material beginning at the surface and continuing to a depth of 6.6 feet (2 m) or more, and rates its overall integrity as substantially disturbed: besides Moore's excavations, the deposits were mined for shell during the mid-twentieth century.

Mounds and stelae of the Crystal River complex
| Designation | Type | Description | Notes |
|---|---|---|---|
| Mound A | Stepped platform | Approximately 26 feet (8 m)-tall stepped platform mound on the southern margin of the complex; the largest surviving earthwork at the site. | Built in at least three stages, beginning cal AD 398–480, cal AD 481–548, and cal AD 617–940. A wooden staircase provides visitor access to the summit. Rated in poor condition; the southern slope, cut by heavy machinery, continues to deteriorate. |
| Mound B | Shell midden ridge | Extensive shell midden ridge fronting the river and extending north from Mound A. | Designated a "mound" by earlier researchers; provides much of the chronological control for the site through Bullen's 1951 stratigraphic excavation. |
| Mound C | Circular embankment | Circular embankment enclosing the smaller Mounds D, E, and F. | Together with the enclosed mounds constitutes the Main Burial Complex. Modeled construction begins 2043–913 cal BC, although the estimate is weakly constrained. Moore's 1918 return excavation concentrated on this feature. |
| Mound D | Small burial mound | Small burial mound within the Mound C embankment. | Part of the Main Burial Complex; not represented in the dated sample. |
| Mound E | Small platform | Small platform mound within the Mound C embankment; Moore's "artificial elevation." | Modeled together with Mound F as a single construction stage beginning 256–42 cal BC. Addressed by Moore in his 1906 field season. |
| Mound F | Central sand burial mound | Central sand mound within the Mound C embankment. | Modeled together with Mound E as a single construction stage. Principal target of Moore's 1903 excavation; yielded the copper, mica, quartz-crystal, and shell assemblages that anchored subsequent debate over Crystal River's Hopewellian connections. |
| Mound G | Discrete burial mound | Discrete burial mound anchoring the northern side of the plaza together with Mound H. | Modeled construction begins 80 cal BC – cal AD 125, with use continuing to cal AD 372–618. Bullen's 1960 trench in this mound identified 35 burials. |
| Mound H | Flat-topped platform | Lozenge-shaped flat-topped platform mound bounding the northern edge of the plaza. | Built in two stages beginning cal AD 340–475 and cal AD 425–534. The former ramp points across the plaza to Stela 2 and, beyond it, to Mound K. Formerly rated poor; condition upgraded to fair following recovery of vegetative cover. |
| Mound J | Irregular shell mound | Irregular shell mound identified during Bullen's 1960 topographic remapping. | Built in two stages beginning cal AD 324–628 and cal AD 561–640. Not shown on Moore's 1903 map. |
| Mound K | Small flat-topped platform | Small flat-topped platform mound identified during Bullen's 1960 remapping. | Built in two stages beginning cal AD 335–476 and cal AD 427–541; not shown on Moore's 1903 map. |
| Stela 1 | Carved limestone slab | Upright limestone boulder bearing a low-relief anthropomorphic carving with human head, ear spool, flowing hair, and torso. | Discovered March 1964 during park clearing. Positioned on the axis of Mound A's former ramp. See Stelae below. |
| Stela 2 | Uncarved limestone slab | Upright uncarved limestone boulder standing midway across the plaza. | Discovered March 1964. Positioned on the axis from the ramp of Mound H toward Mound K. |
| Third stone | Limestone slab | Stone reportedly bearing a hand-shaped inscription; displaced from its original position during museum construction. | Reported by Clark Hardman Jr. (1971), who placed it possibly on Mound B facing the winter-solstice sunset. Sources differ on its present location and condition. |
Modeled construction dates are 68% posterior density estimates from Bayesian analysis of radiocarbon and optically stimulated luminescence dates. Pluckhahn and Thompson emphasize modeled start dates, since modeled end dates are frequently unconstrained by the available stratigraphic assumptions. Mounds B and D are not represented in the dated sample.

=== Chronology and cultural affiliation ===
Substantive use of the Crystal River complex began by the second century AD and continued for roughly a millennium, spanning the Deptford, Santa Rosa–Swift Creek, and early Weeden Island periods, with possible but uncertain continuation into the Safety Harbor period. The Bayesian-modeled chronology developed by Thomas J. Pluckhahn and Victor D. Thompson recasts the complex as a long-occupied village and ceremonial center rather than a purely mortuary site, and identifies its residents as participants in a broad web of regional and interregional exchange linking the northern Gulf Coast with Glades-tradition communities to the south. By around 1050, activity at the main complex declined and ceremonial functions shifted downstream to the Roberts Island complex, where mound-building and occupation continued until the site was largely depopulated around 1233. Milanich classes the north peninsular Gulf Coast among the nonagricultural regions of late precolumbian Florida, in contrast to the inland Fort Walton and Alachua cultures. Phase-by-phase construction and midden chronology is covered in Chronology and cultural affiliation below.

Occupation at Crystal River spans roughly a millennium of substantive use, extending from the Deptford period through the late Weeden Island period; activity at the main complex declined by around 1050, with ceremonial functions in the final phase shifting downstream to the Roberts Island complex. The site's cultural affiliation was long contested. Sears's 1962 paper placed it within the Hopewell interaction sphere as a primarily mortuary center, a view grounded in the copper-rich burial assemblages Moore had recovered from the Main Burial Complex; that framework structured discussion of the site for the following four decades. The reinvestigation by Pluckhahn and Thompson, drawing on an expanded program of radiocarbon dating and Bayesian modeling, substantially revised the received chronology and reframed the site as a long-occupied village and ceremonial complex rather than a purely mortuary center.

Pluckhahn and Thompson divide the midden-based occupation of the two sites into four modeled phases, based on Bayesian analysis of 26 radiocarbon dates from midden trenches and shovel tests at Crystal River and Roberts Island:

- Phase 1 (about cal AD 125–242): emergence of the site as a ceremonial center and early seasonally occupied village.
- Phase 2 (about cal AD 238–499): expansion to the site's full areal extent and shift toward more permanent occupation. The three principal flat-topped platform mounds (A, H, and K) were constructed during this phase, and the community became fully embedded in the emerging Weeden Island ceramic and mortuary traditions of the Gulf Coast.
- Phase 3 (about cal AD 521–747): continued mound construction and midden accumulation; substantive occupation began at Roberts Island downstream.
- Phase 4 (about cal AD 779–982): ceremonial functions at the main complex declined; Roberts Island became the primary center, with construction of its three flat-topped platform mounds. Activity at the main complex had largely ceased by around 1050, while Roberts Island remained in use until about 1233.

Locally produced material culture includes Deptford, Santa Rosa–Swift Creek, and Weeden Island series pottery, Swift Creek complicated-stamped ceramics, worked bone, and shell tools; limestone-tempered pottery came to dominate the midden assemblages by Phase 2, forming over 70 percent of that phase's ceramics.

=== Stelae ===
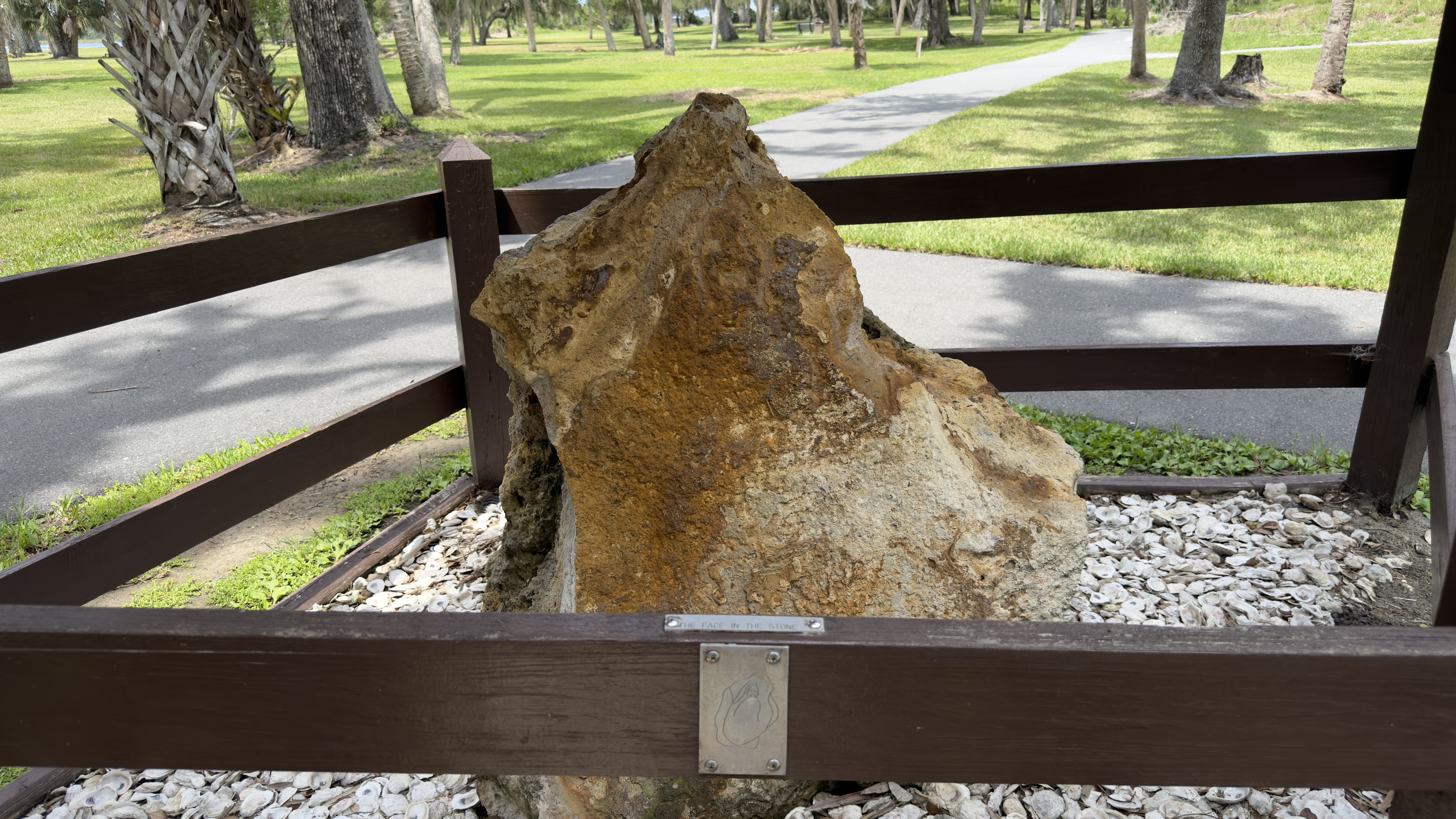
Stela 1; the incised figure is visible from this angle

Three upright limestone boulders, two bearing carved inscriptions, stand within the main complex; Bullen referred to them as "stelae," a term more typically associated with the vertically placed slabs of Mesoamerica. Stelae 1 and 2 were discovered in March 1964 as the property was being cleared for the creation of the state park and remain in the original portion of the park. A third inscribed stone, reportedly bearing a design in the shape of a human hand, was reported by Clark Hardman Jr. in 1971 after being displaced from its original position during museum construction; Hardman placed it possibly on Mound B, where it would have faced the winter-solstice sunset. Pluckhahn and Thompson describe this stone as buried near the museum.

Stela 1 bears a low-relief carving of an anthropomorphic figure with a human head (showing eyes, mouth, an ear spool, and flowing hair) atop a torso; Bullen's examination suggested the face carving is older than the torso. Limited excavation around the base of Stela 1 revealed a small concentration of animal bones and other artifacts atop a cobblestone pavement on the east side, and produced two radiocarbon assays whose 68 percent probability ranges are cal AD 223–652 and cal AD 432–765. Stela 2, uncarved, stands about midway across the plaza along the axis extending from the ramp of Mound H toward Mound K.

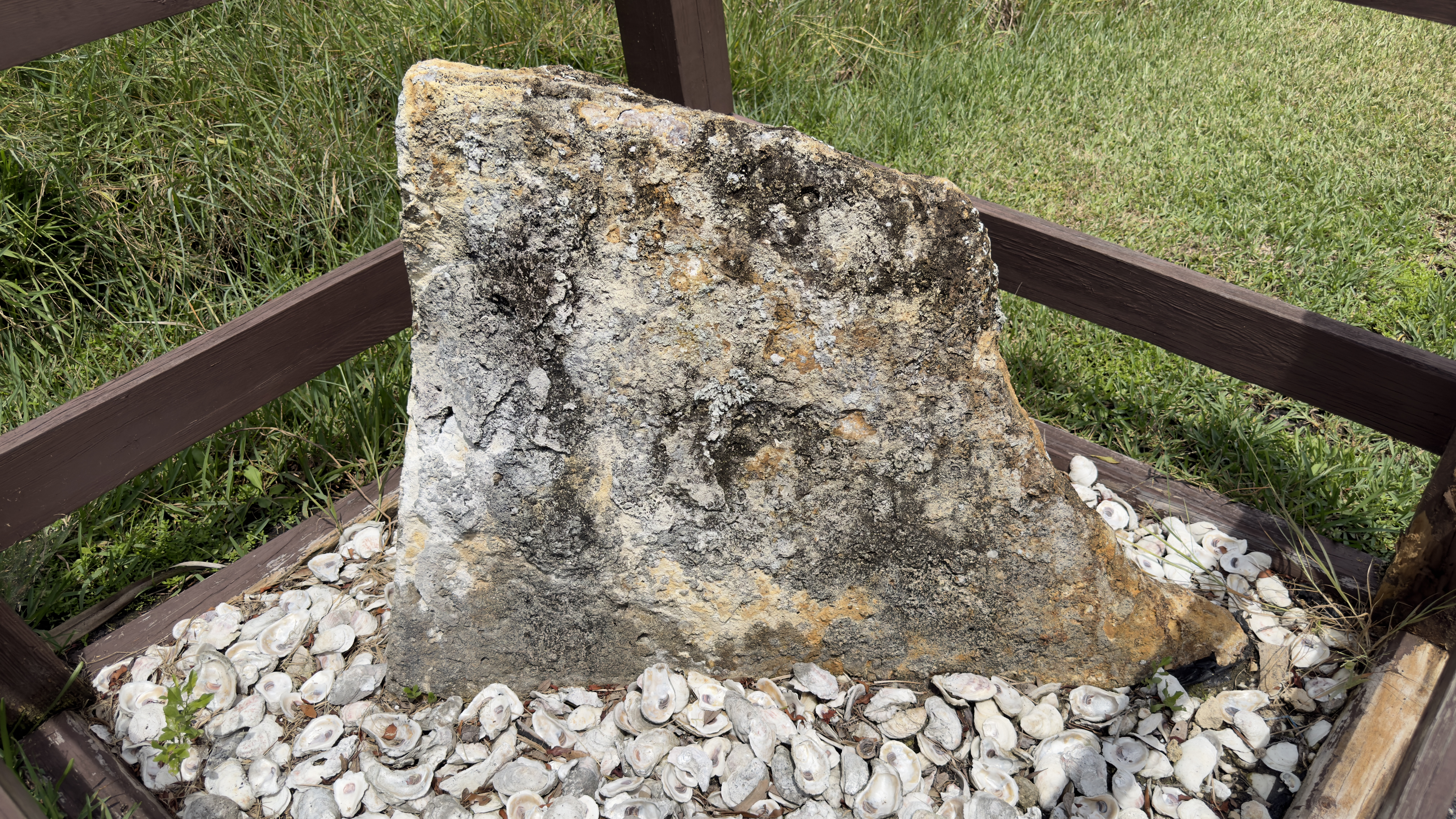
Stela 2, uncarved, standing midway across the plaza

Bullen noted a spatial complementarity between the stelae and the flat-topped mounds: the former ramp of Mound A pointed roughly toward Stela 1, and the ramp of Mound H points across the plaza to Stela 2 and, beyond it, to Mound K. Clark Hardman Jr. (1971) developed this observation into a broader solar-observatory reading of the mound group, arguing that Stela 1 faces the summer-solstice sunrise as observed from Mound A and that other features of the complex mark solstice, equinox, and stellar alignments. Bullen tentatively raised the possibility of a stylistic connection to Mesoamerican traditions, and John H. McMichael extended it into a Maya-immigrant hypothesis, but the idea has not been supported by subsequent research; Bullen himself later characterized it as "a little enthusiastic," and current treatments regard the stelae as a distinctive local expression whose iconographic parallels remain unresolved.

=== Artifacts and exchange ===
Moore's excavations at the Main Burial Complex (particularly Mound F) recovered a distinctive assemblage that has anchored discussion of long-distance exchange at Crystal River since the early twentieth century: copper panpipes and ornaments, mica sheet, quartz crystal artifacts, ground stone, and marine-shell cups, gorgets, plummets, and pendants associated with human burials. The presence of these materials, whose raw material sources lie well outside peninsular Florida, has supported a range of interpretive frameworks over the twentieth and early twenty-first centuries.

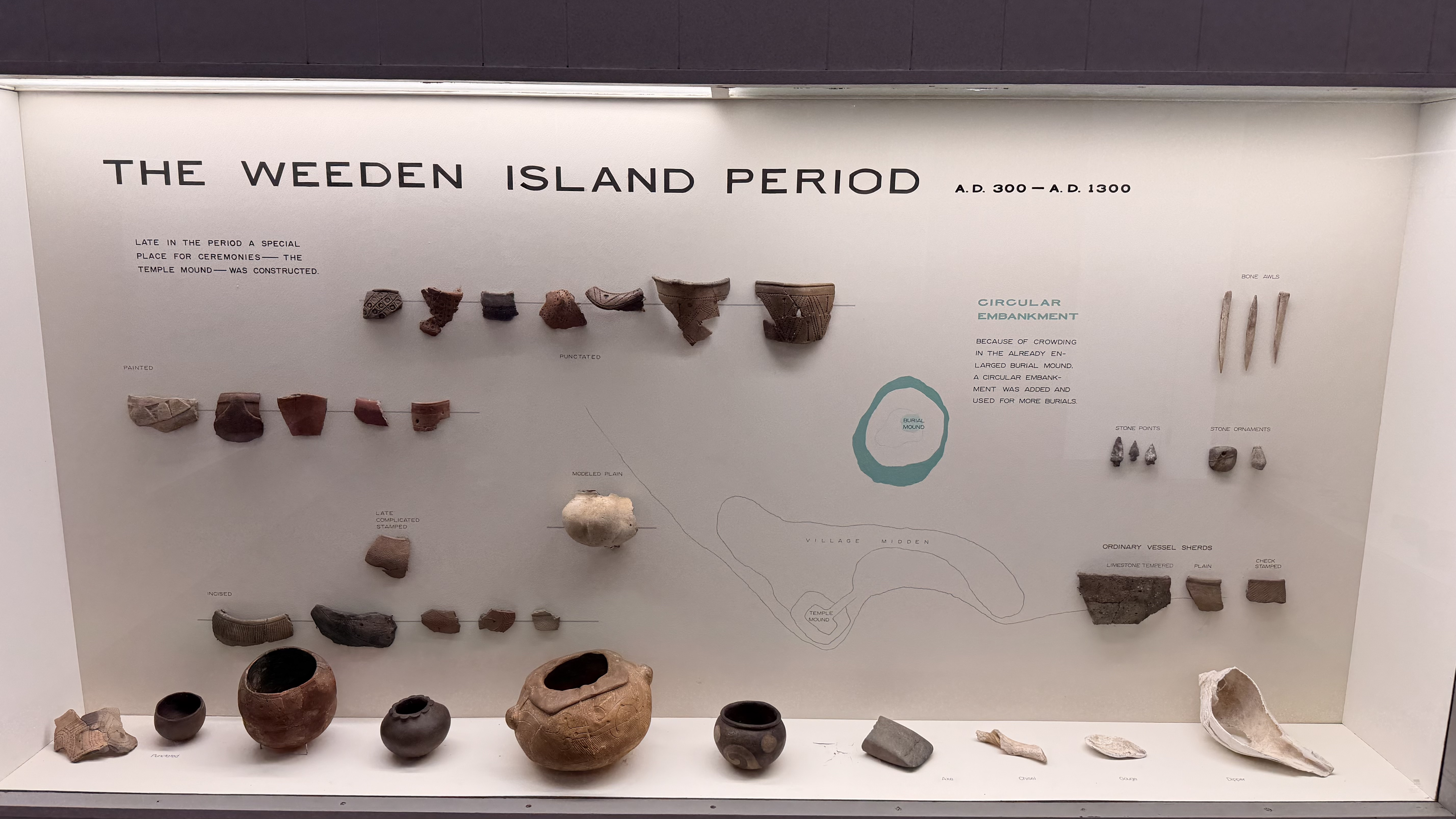
Weeden Island artifact display from the Crystal River Archaeological State Park Museum

The mid-twentieth-century view following Sears (1962) located Crystal River within a Hopewellian exchange network centered on the Ohio River valley. Sharon Goad's 1978–1979 models built on this framing, arguing that Crystal River had controlled the export of lightning-whelk shell cups and ornaments northward into the Hopewell heartland, giving the community a monopoly on the import of nonlocal goods such as copper. Pluckhahn and Thompson's reinvestigation has since substantially revised this interpretation. Their surveys show that lightning whelks are rare in the middens at Crystal River, the species is far more abundant in southwestern Florida and in the Apalachicola area of the Panhandle, and evidence for on-site working of large marine gastropods into ornaments is very limited. They instead characterize Crystal River as a "gateway or entrepôt" between two areas of high craft productivity with distinct resources and technologies: the Weeden Island area of the northern Gulf Coast, and the Glades-tradition communities of southwestern Florida to the south.

Specific evidence for southern connections includes a distinctive class of shell ornaments known as Tabbed Circular Artifacts (TCAs), of which Crystal River has produced more than half of the 20 known examples, one of which closely resembles a specimen from the Miami Circle site in southeastern Florida. Biological-distance analysis of skeletal populations from Florida sites has identified relatively close connections between Crystal River and the Yellow Bluffs mound site several hundred miles to the south, consistent with the movement or intermarriage of people between Crystal River and areas where lightning-whelk shells and shell-crafting traditions were more established. Locally produced material culture is dominated by limestone-tempered pottery of the Deptford, Santa Rosa–Swift Creek, and Weeden Island series, along with worked bone and shell tools; small quantities of imported mica and quartz debris in the middens indicate continuing exchange with communities to the north throughout the site's occupation.

=== Roberts Island complex ===
The Roberts Island complex, located approximately 0.31 miles (0.5 km) downstream of the main Crystal River complex at the junction of the Crystal and Salt Rivers, comprises three flat-topped shell platform mounds designated Mounds A, B, and C together with an extensive shell midden ridge and associated features. The complex was first professionally described by Ripley and Adelaide Bullen in 1961; Brent Weisman later grouped five separately recorded FMSF sites at this location into the single "Roberts Island Shell Mound Complex." Weisman characterized the site as "the best preserved example of an aboriginal ceremonial and village mound complex on the entire Florida Gulf Coast," a judgment quoted in Pluckhahn and Thompson's summary of the Roberts Island literature.

The Roberts Island mounds served as the region's principal ceremonial complex during the final phase of occupation (Phase 4, about cal AD 779–982), after activity had declined at the main Crystal River site. Bayesian modeling of radiocarbon and OSL dates indicates that Roberts Island Mound A was constructed between about cal AD 865 and 1045, and Mound B between about cal AD 1055 and 1165; the complex was largely depopulated by around AD 1233.

Mound A (on FMSF site 8CI41) is the largest and best-preserved earthwork in the complex, a rectangular platform measuring 95 by 105 feet (29 by 32 m) at the base, 46 by 69 feet (14 by 21 m) at the summit, and about 13 feet (4 m) above the surrounding ground. Its axes are aligned precisely with the cardinal directions, with the long axis running north–south; a discontinuity along the eastern slope suggests a ramp connecting the summit to a flat plaza-like area that extends about 130 feet (40 m) eastward. Excavation revealed that the mound was constructed almost entirely of oyster shell in a stepped configuration, the first identified example of stepped mound construction in the Woodland period, and the first known example of any period constructed from shell.

Mound B (on site 8CI40) is a rectangular platform mound oriented northeast–southwest, measuring 184 by 98 feet (56 by 30 m) at the base and 131 by 59 feet (40 by 18 m) at the summit, and standing about 6.6 feet (2 m) above the surrounding marsh. A private residence was constructed on its summit in the 1950s, causing substantial disturbance. Excavation showed that the mound was also constructed almost entirely of oyster shell in a stepped configuration.

Mound C (on site 8CI36), (Note: Pluckhahn and Thompson (2018) contain an internal discrepancy on this designation: chapter 2 and the site map (Figure 2.5) assign Mound C to FMSF site 8CI36, while chapter 7 identifies it as site 8CI39. The map and chapter 2 assignment is used here.) confirmed by LiDAR survey, measures 108 by 85 feet (33 by 26 m) at the base and 82 by 56 feet (25 by 17 m) at the summit, rises about 2.46 feet (75 cm) above the surrounding marsh, and is oriented at approximately 120°.

The three mounds appear to form an integrated ceremonial complex arranged with respect to astronomical events: Mound A and the adjoining plaza are oriented due east to the equinox sunrise, and Mounds B and C are roughly oriented to the solstice sunrise and sunset. The triangular arrangement parallels the mound pattern documented at the McKeithen site in the Florida Panhandle. Additional features at the complex include a "water court", a roughly rectangular depression measuring about 66 by 20 feet (20 by 6 m) enclosed by shell walls, and one or two narrow linear shell ridges extending southeast; both feature types are more commonly associated with the Caloosahatchee culture of southwestern Florida, and the parallel is one of several lines of evidence that Pluckhahn and Thompson cite for increased connection between Roberts Island and communities to the south during Phase 4.

Analysis of pollen and oyster isotopes from Phase 4 contexts suggests that the mounds and midden at Roberts Island were built rapidly, largely during the cooler months, and that oysters were procured from higher-salinity habitats closer to the Gulf than had been the case during earlier phases at the main Crystal River site.

== Geology and climate ==
=== Physiography ===
The park sits on the Gulf Coastal Lowlands, the flat plain running from the foot of the Brooksville Ridge west to the Gulf of Mexico; little of the property rises more than 5 feet (1.5 m) above sea level. Nearly all of the park's relief (its variation in height) is human-made: the mounds, middens, and embankments built up over a millennium of occupation. The highest point, the flattened summit of Mound A at 29 feet (8.8 m), is itself an earthwork.

The underlying surface is the Pamlico terrace, the youngest and lowest of Florida's Pleistocene marine terraces, cut and built in turn as the sea advanced and withdrew. A thin cover of Pleistocene sand, coquina, marl, and estuarine sediments overlies the eroded limestones of the Ocala Platform, the buried structural high on which the park stands. The modern coast is submerged, evidenced by extensive marsh and the many drowned river valleys along the Citrus County shoreline.

=== Soils ===
Eight soil units are mapped across the park, most draining poorly or very poorly; two units owe their character to modern earthmoving, and on the higher ground the soils were altered, and in places brought into being, by prehistoric mound-building. Fill taken from Mound A went into the neighboring White tract when that parcel was developed as a mobile-home park in the mid-1960s.

=== Hydrology ===
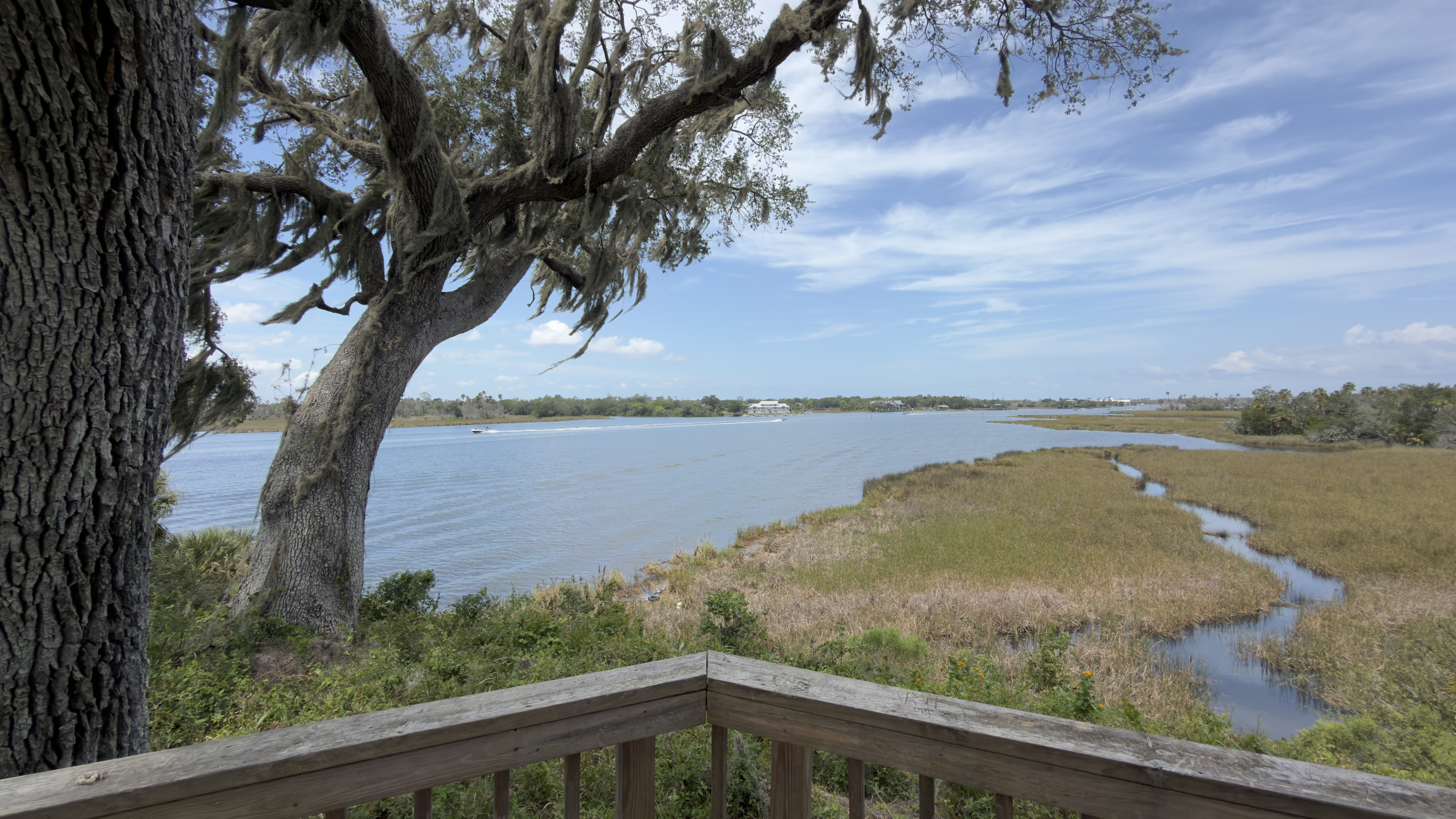
The Crystal River from the observation platform on the summit of Mound A

The park falls within the Crystal River–St. Petersburg Beach drainage basin, a coastal watershed of short winding streams. Two of these define its edges: the Crystal River, which rises to the southeast in the spring group at Kings Bay and runs some 5 miles (8.0 km) northwest to the Gulf, and the Salt River, which branches away at Roberts Island's eastern tip and reaches the Gulf by its own course. Both are tidal where they pass the property.

Most of the park drains slowly, the exception being the raised, culturally derived soils of the mound complex, which shed water readily. High water can inundate much of the site, and salt water may linger long enough to kill vegetation intolerant of it; culverts laid beneath the interpretive trail carry rainwater off the site but equally admit the tide.

=== Climate ===
Crystal River Archaeological State Park has a humid subtropical climate (Köppen Cfa) characteristic of central peninsular Florida, moderated by the adjacent warm waters of the Gulf of Mexico. Most of the annual precipitation falls between June and October, in the form of heavy afternoon thunderstorms, and the area lies within the Atlantic hurricane belt. Records from the three permanent weather stations operating in Citrus and Levy counties when Vernon wrote in 1951 gave an average annual rainfall of 49.99 inches (1,269.7 mm) for the period 1841–1949, roughly three inches below the statewide average of the time.

== Ecology ==
=== Natural communities ===
Three natural communities are mapped within the park, alongside land classified as developed: shell mound, hydric hammock, and salt marsh.

The shell mound community is a product of human activity rather than natural succession, and it appears at scattered points across both parcels, together amounting to some 11.8 acres (4.8 ha). Where limestone outcropped through the surrounding hammock, shell was deposited over it; elsewhere shell was heaped onto marsh to raise a dry approach to the rivers. Vegetation on the mainland mounds is kept low as a deliberate management policy, holding back woody root systems that would disturb the deposits below; introduced lawn grasses, including St. Augustine, cover the surfaces. Roberts Island presents the opposite picture, an unbroken canopy standing over its shell and assessed as being in good condition; its deposits postdate those of the main complex by upward of four centuries.

At roughly 38.4 acres (15.5 ha), hydric hammock covers more of the park than the other two communities and the developed land combined. It forms a perimeter around the mainland parcel and, in a coastal form, blankets most of Roberts Island; managers rate both stands very good, with invasive-plant control the only routine requirement. Where mowing has ceased the hammock has begun reclaiming ground, and it continues without interruption onto neighboring parcels that the state also owns and the Division of Recreation and Parks also manages.

Salt marsh amounts to only about 0.23 acres (931 m^{2}) inside the park, a narrow band of estuarine marsh at the mainland parcel's southwestern edge where it meets the Crystal River. Far more marsh surrounds Roberts Island, but that expanse falls outside the park boundary. The community is judged to be in very good condition and needs almost no intervention.

=== Flora ===
The plant inventory compiled for the park records the overstory of its hammock communities as dominated by live oak (Quercus virginiana), laurel oak (Quercus laurifolia), cabbage palm (Sabal palmetto), southern magnolia (Magnolia grandiflora), and red bay (Persea borbonia), with saw palmetto, wax myrtle, and yaupon common in the understory. Notable herbaceous and epiphytic taxa include the prairie iris (Iris hexagona), green-fly orchid (Epidendrum conopseum), and the giant leather fern (Acrostichum danaeifolium).

Non-native plants established within the park include Brazilian pepper (Schinus terebinthifolius), Chinese tallow (Sapium sebiferum), air-potato (Dioscorea bulbifera), skunkvine (Paederia foetida), common water-hyacinth (Eichhornia crassipes), and Chinese wisteria (Wisteria sinensis).

=== Fauna ===
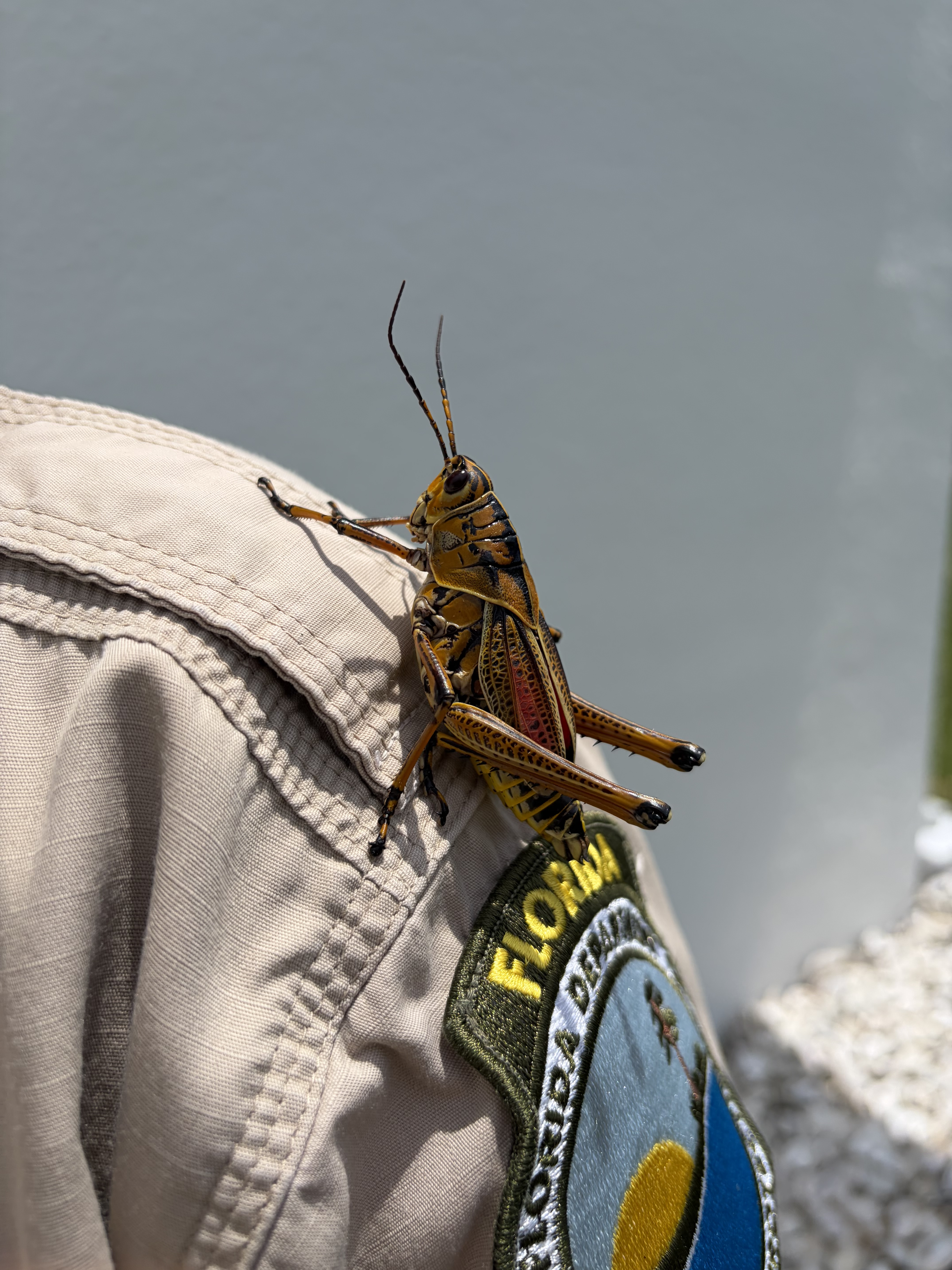
An eastern lubber grasshopper (Romalea microptera), a large native grasshopper of the southeastern United States

Mammals recorded at the park include the West Indian manatee (Trichechus manatus), bobcat, river otter, Virginia opossum, and marsh rabbit; the nine-banded armadillo and, occasionally, feral hogs moving in from the adjacent Crystal River Preserve State Park are established non-natives. Bird life is extensive, dominated by wading birds (great blue heron, great egret, snowy egret, white ibis, and others) alongside the wood stork, anhinga, brown pelican, and a range of raptors that includes the bald eagle, osprey, and swallow-tailed kite. Among reptiles and amphibians, the American alligator occurs in the park's aquatic habitats, and recorded species include the gopher tortoise, Florida softshell, eastern indigo snake, and the venomous Florida cottonmouth and eastern diamondback rattlesnake, with six frog and toad species recorded.

Six species on the park's imperiled-species inventory carry state or federal listing. The two plants are the giant leather fern, which the Florida Department of Agriculture and Consumer Services lists as threatened, and Godfrey's swampprivet (Forestiera godfreyi), listed by the same agency as endangered and rated globally imperiled by the Florida Natural Areas Inventory; Roberts Island holds most of both. The four birds are the little blue heron, tricolored heron, and roseate spoonbill (Platalea ajaja), all state-threatened, together with the federally threatened wood stork. Manatees frequent the Crystal and Salt Rivers and gather in numbers to overwinter in the Kings Bay stretch. The eastern indigo snake and bald eagle are on record at the park as well, although at 61 acres (25 ha) it supplies only a small part of what either species needs, and the gopher tortoise turns up only in passing.

== Management ==
The park's principal management priorities include protection of the shell mounds from looting and storm damage, monitoring of hydrologic change in the hydric hammock, and gradual replacement of the engineered seawall with a living shoreline.

Sea-level rise has already made the site measurably wetter than in recent memory: marsh plants have begun to establish in low spots inside the developed area, and salt water occasionally lingers long enough to kill vegetation intolerant of it. Water quality across the Crystal River–St. Petersburg Beach drainage basin is rated good overall, but nitrate levels in the Kings Bay springs climbed through the later twentieth century, and any sustained decline is identified as the principal long-term threat to the park's small salt-marsh community, together with the scarring left by airboats cutting across it.

Physical condition ratings on the individual mounds vary. Mound A is rated in poor condition, with its southern slope, cut by heavy machinery during the mid-twentieth century, continuing to deteriorate; Mound H, formerly rated poor, was upgraded to fair after vegetative cover was restored. In 2012, a team from the University of South Florida's Alliance for Integrated Spatial Technologies completed a predictive model for the park, combining LiDAR imagery, historic aerial photographs, historic survey maps, and existing archaeological research maps to classify roughly 31.31 acres (12.67 ha) of the property as high-sensitivity for archaeological resources; the model gives park staff a spatial framework for siting future work with minimal impact on undisturbed deposits.

The park's invasive-plant management program specifically targets three established non-native species (Brazilian pepper, Chinese tallow, and skunkvine), with an annual treatment goal of 20 acres (8 ha).

== Recreation ==
Visitors come to the park for interpretation of its cultural resources and for fishing, picnicking, hiking, birding, and nature study. The Crystal River yields both saltwater and freshwater catches, largemouth bass and redfish among them, and the Great Florida Birding and Wildlife Trail counts the park among the stops on its western section. Boat tours of the Crystal River, which offer a view of the mound complex from the water, operate from the boat basin at the neighboring Crystal River Preserve State Park rather than from the archaeological park itself. The amphitheater-style seating adjacent to Mound A is commonly used as a wedding venue.

A paved interpretive trail 0.75 miles (1.21 km) in length runs through the main mound complex, with trailside exhibits at the principal features, and a stairway leads to the summit of Mound A.

Attendance is relatively low compared with other units in the Florida state park system, and visitation peaks in the cooler months; anglers are most numerous in the fall, and winter brings aggregations of manatees into the Crystal River seeking refuge from cooler Gulf water. The park recorded 42,719 visitors in fiscal year 2022–23, which the Division of Recreation and Parks estimated as contributing about US$5.6 million in direct economic impact to the local economy.

=== Visitor information ===
A paved parking area at the mainland entrance adjoins the visitor center, which houses interpretive exhibits offering an overview of the site's history and of the culture of the people who built and used the ceremonial complex, together with a collection of artifacts recovered from the Crystal River region, including ceramics, worked bone and shell, and stone tools; interpretation is anchored by a large diorama illustrating the extent of the site in earlier periods. Dan P. Branch and David Reaves, both of Gainesville, designed the building in collaboration with the Division's staff architect Warren Dixon; completed in 1965, it is valued as mid-century modern work and is treated as a historic resource pending formal evaluation. An observation platform on the summit of Mound A offers views over the river and surrounding marsh.

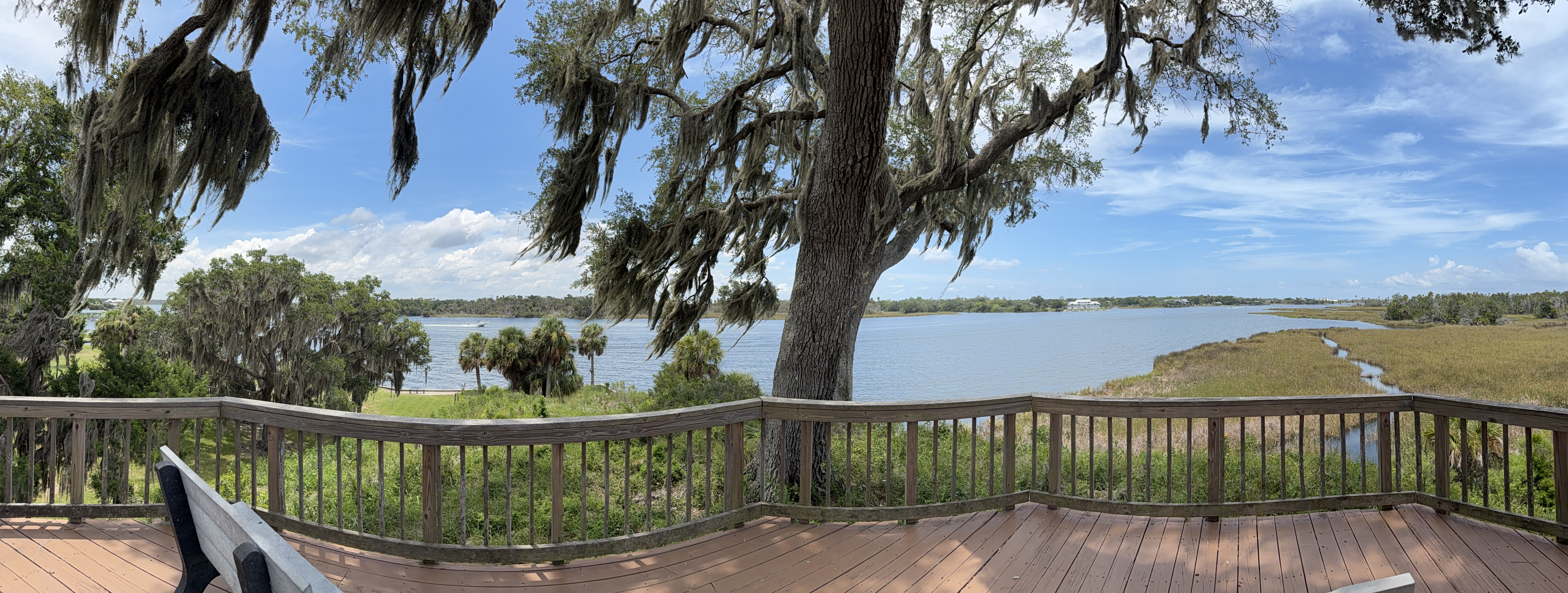
Panorama of the Crystal River and the surrounding salt marsh from the summit of Mound A
