= Cambridge Manuals in Archaeology =

Book series

The Cambridge Manuals in Archaeology form a book series published by Cambridge University Press in the field of archaeology.

== Volumes ==
- Richard I. Macphail; Paul Goldberg (21 December 2017). Applied Soils and Micromorphology in Archaeology. Cambridge University Press. ISBN 978-1-107-01138-0.
- David L. Carlson (26 June 2017). Quantitative Methods in Archaeology Using R. Cambridge University Press. ISBN 978-1-107-04021-2.
- Clive Orton; Michael Hughes (13 May 2013). Pottery in Archaeology. Cambridge University Press. ISBN 978-1-107-43393-9.
- Tony Waldron (20 October 2008). Palaeopathology. Cambridge University Press. ISBN 978-1-139-47400-9.
- R. Lee Lyman (31 March 2008). Quantitative Paleozoology. Cambridge University Press. ISBN 978-1-139-47112-1.
- Elizabeth J. Reitz; Elizabeth S. Wing (14 January 2008). Zooarchaeology. Cambridge University Press. ISBN 978-1-139-46774-2.
- Pollard, M., C. M. Batt, B. Stern & S. Young (2007). Analytical Chemistry in Archaeology. Cambridge University Press. ISBN 978-0-521-65572-9.
- Andrew T. Chamberlain (6 July 2006). Demography in Archaeology. Cambridge University Press. ISBN 978-1-139-45534-3.
- James Conolly; Mark Lake (4 May 2006). Geographical Information Systems in Archaeology. Cambridge University Press. ISBN 978-0-521-79330-8.
- William Andrefsky, Jr (8 December 2005). Lithics: Macroscopic Approaches to Analysis. Cambridge University Press. ISBN 978-1-139-44819-2.
- Simon Hillson (21 July 2005). Teeth. Cambridge University Press. ISBN 978-0-521-83701-9.
- Clive Orton (11 May 2000). Sampling in Archaeology. Cambridge University Press. ISBN 978-0-521-56666-7.
- Anthony G. Brown; Tony Brown; A. G. Brown (27 March 1997). Alluvial Geoarchaeology: Floodplain Archaeology and Environmental Change. Cambridge University Press. ISBN 978-0-521-56820-3.
- Peter G. Dorrell (29 September 1994). Photography in Archaeology and Conservation. Cambridge University Press. ISBN 978-0-521-45554-1.
- R. Lee Lyman (7 July 1994). Vertebrate Taphonomy. Cambridge University Press. ISBN 978-0-521-45840-5.
