= Roberts Island complex =

Archaeological site in Florida

Coordinates: 28.9080°N 82.6398°W

The Roberts Island complex is an archaeological site in Citrus County, Florida, near the Gulf of Mexico, dating from the late Woodland period. It is located on an island in the Crystal River midway between the springs at the head of the river and the mouth of the river on the Gulf of Mexico. The site is a geographically separate unit of the Crystal River Archaeological State Park. The site includes three shell mounds and three middens. Two of the mounds may have had stepped sides. The Roberts Island complex was developed as the Crystal River site declined and most other ceremonial sites in the region were abandoned during the 7th or 8th century.

== Description ==
Roberts Island divides Crystal River and Salt River, a distributary of Crystal River, as they diverge. Both rivers are tidal. The site is 0.5 kilometres (0.31 mi) downstream from the Crystal River archaeological site, Roberts Island has Hallandale-Rock Outcrop as the primary soil type, with some areas of soil produced by prehistoric human activities. Prairie hammock is the primary habitat on Roberts Island, with adjoining tidal marshes and shell mounds. The shell mounds on Roberts Island are covered by a closed canopy forest. The shell mounds on Roberts Island are believed to have mainly been created in hydric or prairie hammocks on outcrops of limestone, although some may have been created in tidal marshes along the rivers. Most of Roberts Island is largely undisturbed, although two houses remain in private hands. While all of the Crystal River site is included in the site designation 8CI1, various features in the Roberts Island complex have been assigned the site designations 8CI36, 8CI37, 8CI39, 8CI40, 8CI41 and 8CI576. Roberts Island was added to the park in 1996.

While the Crystal River Site (Crystal River Mounds) has been studied for more than a century (Clarence Bloomfield Moore published a description of the largest mound at the Crystal River site in 1903), the mounds on Roberts Island did not attract attention from archaeologists until the 1950s, when Ripley and Adelaide Bullen reported on the features now designated as 8CI36, 8CI37, 8CI39, 8CI40, and 8CI41. The feature designated 8CI576 was first described by Gary Ellis in 1993. The Florida Department of Environmental Protection regards the cultural resources of the Roberts Island complex to be comparable to those of the Crystal River site.

== Mound A ==
The largest site on Roberts Island is 8CI41, an island in a marsh about 200 metres (660 ft) long by 20 to 50 metres (66 to 164 ft) wide. The island is covered almost entirely by a midden, on which Mound A was built. People apparently started living on a small island in the marsh on a surface that is now just above mean high tide, when the mean sea level in the area was about 1 metre (3.3 ft) lower than today. Radiocarbon dates indicate the initial occupation of the island started between 571 and 747. A 1 to 1.5 metres (3.3 to 4.9 ft) thick layer of shell midden was deposited on the island during a period lasting until 779 to 982. Mound A was built of oyster shell on top of the midden, apparently contemporaneous with the deposit of the top layer of the midden. The mound is flat-topped, 32 metres (105 ft) long by 29 metres (95 ft) wide at the base, and 21 metres (69 ft) long by 14 metres (46 ft) wide at the top, and is 4 metres (13 ft) high. The long axis of the mound runs north–south. There may have been a ramp descending from the top of the mound on the east side, leading to a possible plaza some 40 metres (130 ft) in length.

Mound A is covered in a layer (Stratum I) of loamy sand that is very dark brown in color and contains small amounts of crushed shell. Below that is a layer (Stratum II) of loamy sand that is dark grey, with some crushed shell. The material beneath the surface layers (Stratum III) consists of intact oyster shells (valves). Pluckhahn, Thomas and Rink report that the mound shows evidence of having stepped sides. A trench excavated on one side of the mound, and ground-penetrating radar (GPR) transects of the mound revealed alternating horizontal and sloped (approximately 45°) elements, with anomalies in the radar transects corresponding to breaks between Stratum II and Stratum III in the stratigraphy in the walls of the trench. The stepped anomalies in the GPR profile appeared on both the north and the south side of the mound, as well as one adjacent to the excavated trench on the west side of the mound. The GPR profile is consistent with the interior of the mound being made entirely of oyster shells. Pluckhahn, Thomas and Rink interpret that consistency to mean that the perceived steps are not the result of random placement of basket loads of shell during construction of the mound. Some of the steps were more evident that others in the sides of the excavated trench. Pluckhahn, Thomas and Rink assume there were six steps above ground level, with the lowest step 90 centimetres (35 in) wide and decreasing in width to 30 centimetres (12 in) for the last step below the top of the mound. The height of each step appears to be about 55 centimetres (22 in). Steps have not been found on other mounds on the Gulf coast of peninsular Florida.

Mound A was built of oyster shells with very little other material present. Various evidence suggests the mound was constructed in a single phase. The size of the shells and isotope analysis of the shells indicate that they were all harvested in the late fall and winter. Pluckhahn, Thompson and Rink suggest that the mound may have been constructed in less than a year. While the summit was not excavated, no evidence of a structure on top of the mound was found.

== Mound B ==
Site 8CI40 (Crystal River 6/CR-6) is a small island northeast of Mound A, almost completely covered by a rectangular mound. Mound B is smaller and lower than Mound A, 56 metres (184 ft) long and 30 metres (98 ft) wide at the base, with a flat top 40 metres (130 ft) long and 18 metres (59 ft) wide. The Bullens described 8CI40 as a temple mound, (Note: The term "temple mound" is based on the description by members of the de Soto expedition of a temple on a constructed earthwork mound in a Safety Harbor village. Bullen and Milanich state that the temples were likely charnel houses, where bodies were prepared and stored for later burial. Several of the temple mounds have been destroyed since the 19th century, but at least fifteen have been documented as having once existed around Tampa Bay and on the Gulf coast near Tampa Bay. These temple mounds were rectangular and had flat tops, usually with a ramp leading up to the top on one side.) with steep sides and a flat top 40 feet (12 m) by 60 feet (18 m). The mound was constructed of oyster shell, and is about the same age as Mound A. The top of the mound is occupied by a house built in the 1950s. Similar to Mound A, Mound B has two relatively thin surface layers. Stratum I is composed of very dark brown loamy sand, but includes many historic and more recent artifacts connected to the 20th century house on the mound. Stratum II, as in Mound A, consists of dark grey loamy sand with some crushed shell. The core of Mound B, similar to the core of Mound A, consists of intact oyster shells. Pluckhahn, Tomas and Rink report evidence of steps on the sides of Mound B, although less distinct than those they found on Mound A. Each step appears to be 1 metre (3.3 ft) wide and 20 centimetres (7.9 in) high. Radiocarbon dates and the composition of ceramics found indicate that the construction of Mound B was contemporaneous with Mound A, in or around the 11th century A.D.

== Mound C ==
Site 8CI36 is a small island southeast of Mound A, with a rectangular mound about 1 metre (3.3 ft) in height. Mound C is 33 metres (108 ft) long and 26 metres (85 ft) wide at the base, and 25 metres (82 ft) long and 17 metres (56 ft) wide at the top. Mound C was also constructed with oyster shells. The period when Mound C was constructed has not been established. The distance from the center of Mound A to the center of Mound B is 93 metres (305 ft), from the center of Mound A to the center of Mound C is 103 metres (338 ft), and from the center of Mound B to the Center of Mound C is 145 metres (476 ft). Pluckhahn, Thomas and Rink suggest that the (approximate) isosceles triangle formed by the three mounds, along with the similar ages of the mounds, indicate that they formed an "integrated architectural complex." The three mounds surround the area that may have been a plaza on the east side of Mound A.

== Middens ==
8CI36 (Crystal River 2/CR-2) is a shell midden 75 feet (23 m) in diameter. 8CI37 (Crystal River 3/CR-3) is a shell midden 150 feet (46 m) in diameter. Weeden Island and Safety Harbor pottery have been found in 8CI37. 8CI39 (Crystal River 5/CR-5) is described as a narrow shell ridge. Deptford, Weeden Island and Safety Harbor pottery have been found in 8CI39.

== Successor to Crystal River ==
A ceremonial center at the Crystal River site originated very early in the current era, likely at some time between 69 and 225. It became a major ceremonial center, described as the southern-most major ceremonial location associated with the Hopewell tradition, but it declined by the 7th or 8th century and had been abandoned as a ceremonial center by the 10th century, although some people continued to live on part of the site. The pottery traditions at the Crystal River site were substantially continued at Roberts Island, indicating a gradual shift of population and ceremonial importance from the Crystal River site to the Roberts Island site. However, ceremonial feasts at Roberts Island were dominated by oysters and other bivalves, while meat from mammals, which had been made up almost half the food at feasts at Crystal River, almost disappeared in feasts at Roberts Island.

== Sources ==
- Pluckhahn, Thomas J.; Thompson, Victor D.; Rink, W. Jack (April 2016). "Evidence for Stepped Pyramids of Shell in the Woodland Period of Eastern North America". American Antiquity. 81 (2): 345–363. doi:10.7183/0002-7316.81.2.345. JSTOR 24712753. S2CID 163464007 – via Academia.edu.
- Pluckhahn, Thomas J.; Thomas, Rachel E.; Kemp, Kassie (November 2016). "Constructing community at civic-ceremonial centers: pottery-making practices at Crystal River and Roberts Island". Southeastern Archaeology. 36 (2): 110–121. doi:10.1080/0734578X.2016.1252190. S2CID 132824170 – via ResearchGate.
- Florida DEP (October 27, 2008). "Crystal River Archaeological State Park Unit Management Plan" (PDF). Florida Department of Environmental Protection.
