= Roberts Island =

Roberts Island may refer to:

- Roberts Island (California), an island in the San Joaquin River Delta
- Roberts Island, Nova Scotia, a community in Canada
- Roberts Island complex, an archaeological site in Florida
- Robert Island, an island in the South Shetland Islands

== See also ==
- Robert Island (Paracel Islands), an island in the South China Sea
