= Elizabeth S. Wing =

Zooarchaeologist (b. 1932)

Elizabeth Schwarz Wing (born 5 March 1932) is a zooarchaeologist and Curator Emerita at the Florida Museum of Natural History (FLMNH).

She was the first woman to earn a doctorate in zoology from the University of Florida. She is one of the founders of the subfield of zooarchaeology, the study of animal remains from archaeological sites, and environmental archaeology, the study of past human relationships with their environments. She is Member Emerita of the National Academy of Sciences.

Wing was born on in Cambridge, Massachusetts. As a child she lived in Vienna, Austria. As a teen, her family lived in Boston, MA where she volunteered at Harvard University's Museum of Comparative Zoology.

Wing earned her Bachelor's degree in Biology from Mt. Holyoke College before beginning her graduate studies at the University of Florida in the 1950s. She founded the Zooarchaeology Laboratory at the Florida Museum of Natural History in 1961, one of the first laboratories of zooarchaeology in the world. She helped establish the International Council for Archaeozoology, participating in its first organizational meeting in 1971. In 1978, she was hired as Curator at the FLMNH. Wing's research addresses the zooarchaeology of the southeastern United States, Caribbean, and Andean region. Wing received the Fryxell Award Award for Interdisciplinary Research from the Society for American Archaeology in 1996. Wing retired from the University of Florida in 2001, and was elected to the International Council for Archaeozoology's Committee of Honor in 2002. In 2006, she was inducted into the National Academy of Sciences (now Emeritus) and was awarded the University of Florida's President's Medallion.

== Selected publications ==
- Newsom, Lee A.; Elizabeth S. Wing (2004). On land and sea: Native American uses of biological resources in the West Indies. University of Alabama Press, Tuscaloosa. ISBN 0-8173-1314-1.
- Reitz, Elizabeth J.; Elizabeth S. Wing (2008). Zooarchaeology. Cambridge Manuals in Archaeology (2 ed.). Cambridge University Press. ISBN 978-0-521-85726-0.
- Wing, Elizabeth S.; Antoinette B. Brown (1979). Paleonutrition: Method and Theory in Prehistoric Foodways. Academic Press. ISBN 978-0-12-759350-0.
- Wing, Elizabeth S.; Wheeler, Jane C. (1988). Economic prehistory of the central Andes. BAR international series 427, Oxford. ISBN 0-86054-552-0.
