= Crystal River Preserve State Park =

State park in Florida, United States

- IUCN category IV (habitat/species management area)
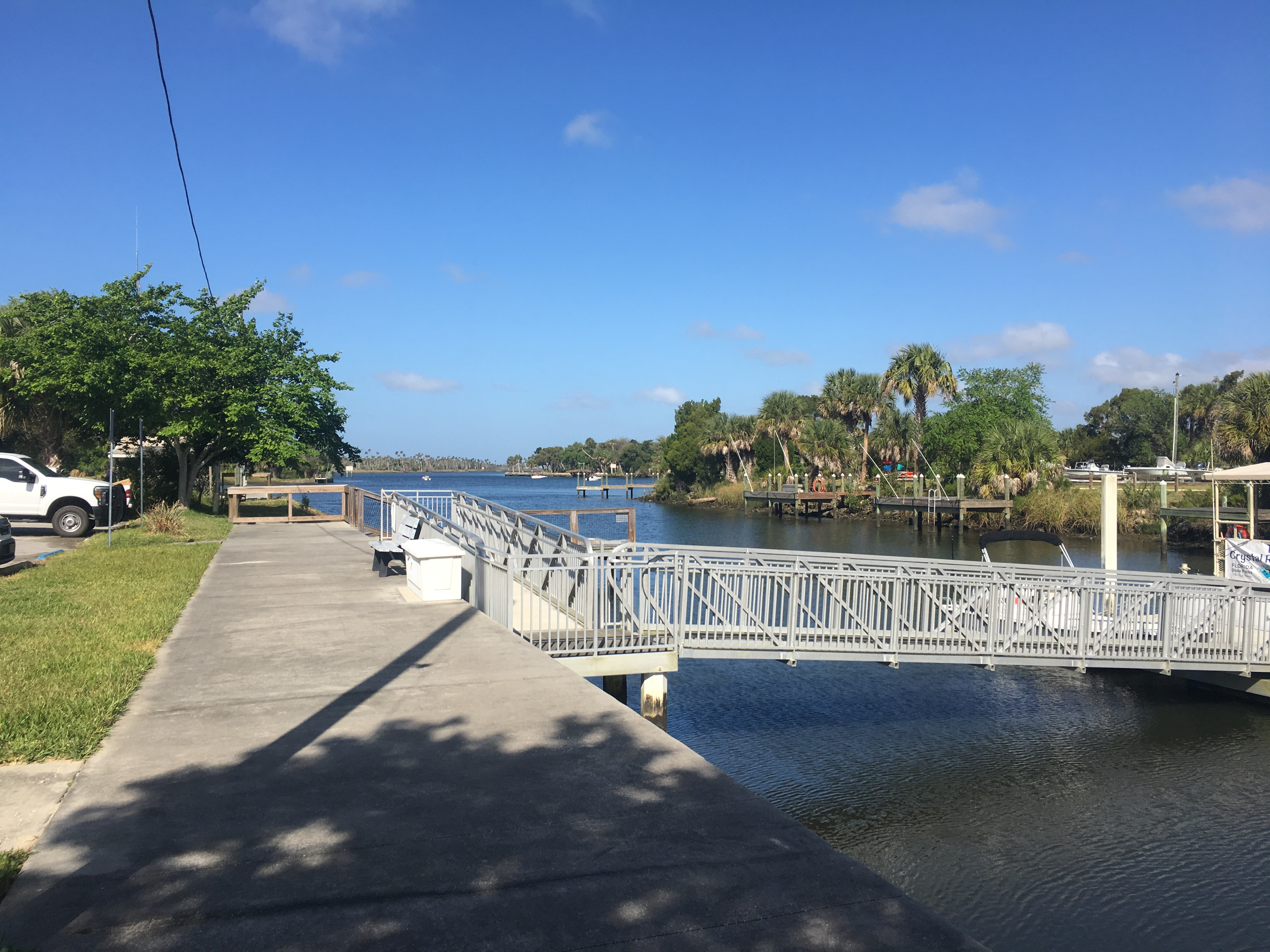
- Main dock at the park

- Location within Florida Location within the United States
- Interactive map of Crystal River Preserve State Park
- Location: Citrus County, Florida, USA
- Nearest city: Crystal River, Florida
- Coordinates: 28°54′31″N 82°38′14″W
- Area: 11,100 ha (27,500 acres)
- Governing body: Florida Department of Environmental Protection

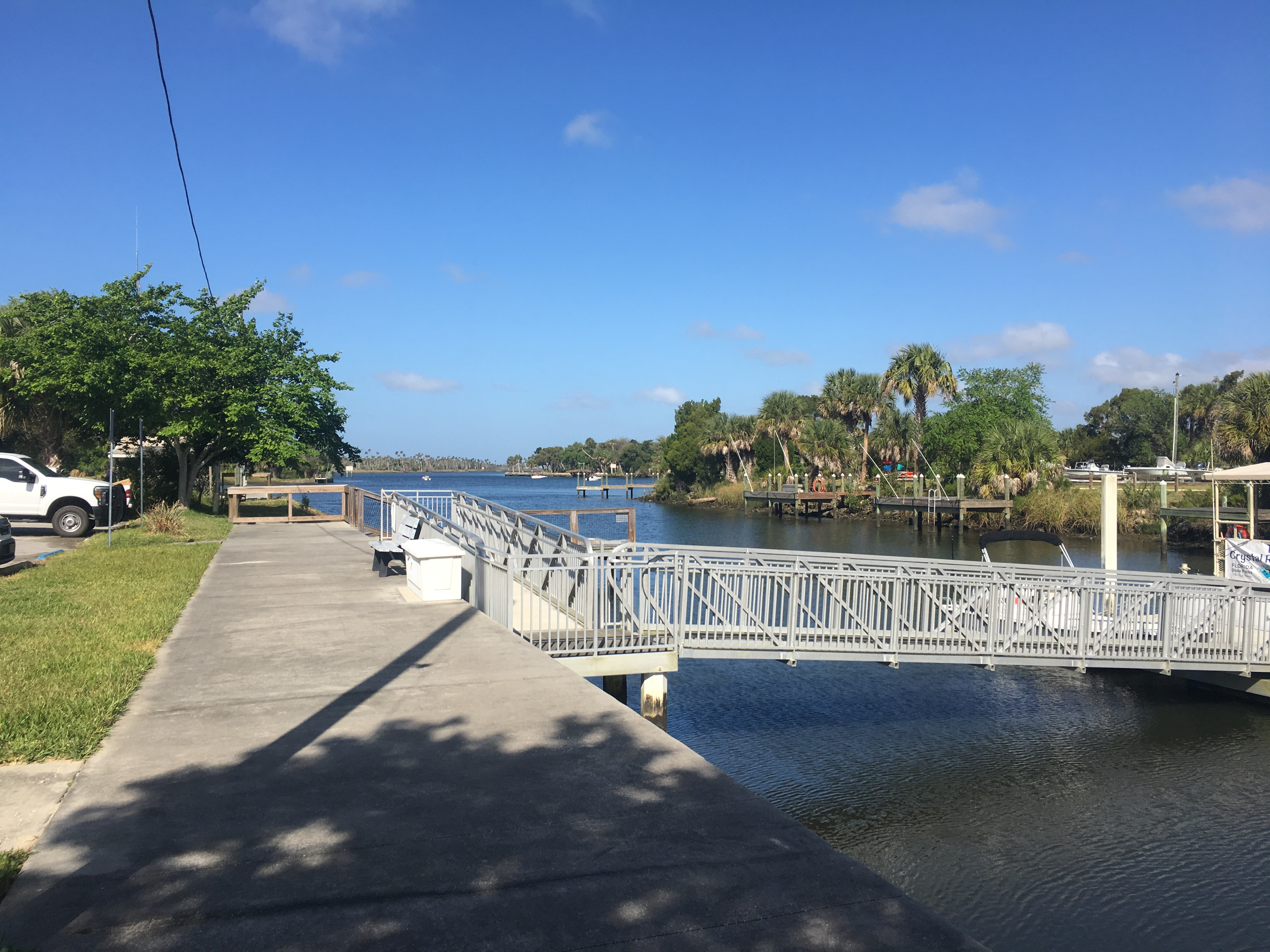
Crystal River Preserve State Park near the visitors center, March 2019

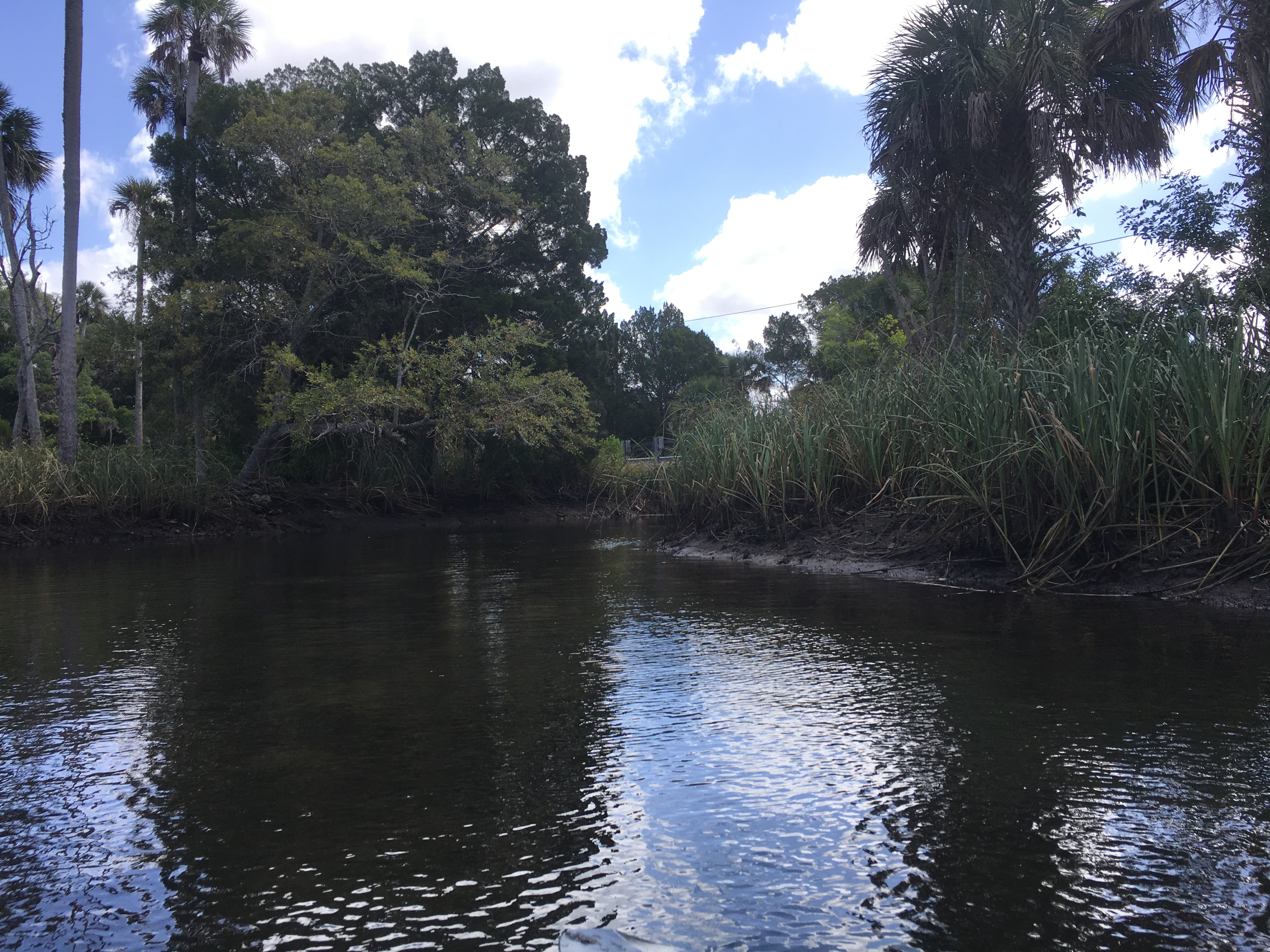
Crystal River Preserve State Park, March 2019

Crystal River Preserve State Park is a Florida State Park, originally known as the Crystal River Buffer Preserve. The Preserve comprises 11,100 ha (27,500 acres) of salt marsh, tidal creeks, mangrove islands, hardwood forests, coastal scrub and pine flat woods.

The Crystal River Preserve is a remnant of the Florida coastline that has changed little since the Europeans arrived more than 500 years ago. It is located in a transitional area from a temperate and sub-tropical climate zone and contains plants and animals from both regions. The preserve follows 20 miles (32 kilometers) of coastline along the Gulf of Mexico from Crystal River though Ozello to Homosassa. The Crystal River Archaeological State Park is located within the park boundary and managed by the Crystal River Preserve State Park.

The primary recreational opportunities at the Preserve are hiking, biking (including a 7-mile trail), birding, kayaking, fishing (freshwater, near shore, and saltwater) and nature observation. Crystal River, which provides refuge to wintering manatees, is located 3 miles southeast of the main park entrance.

== Gallery ==
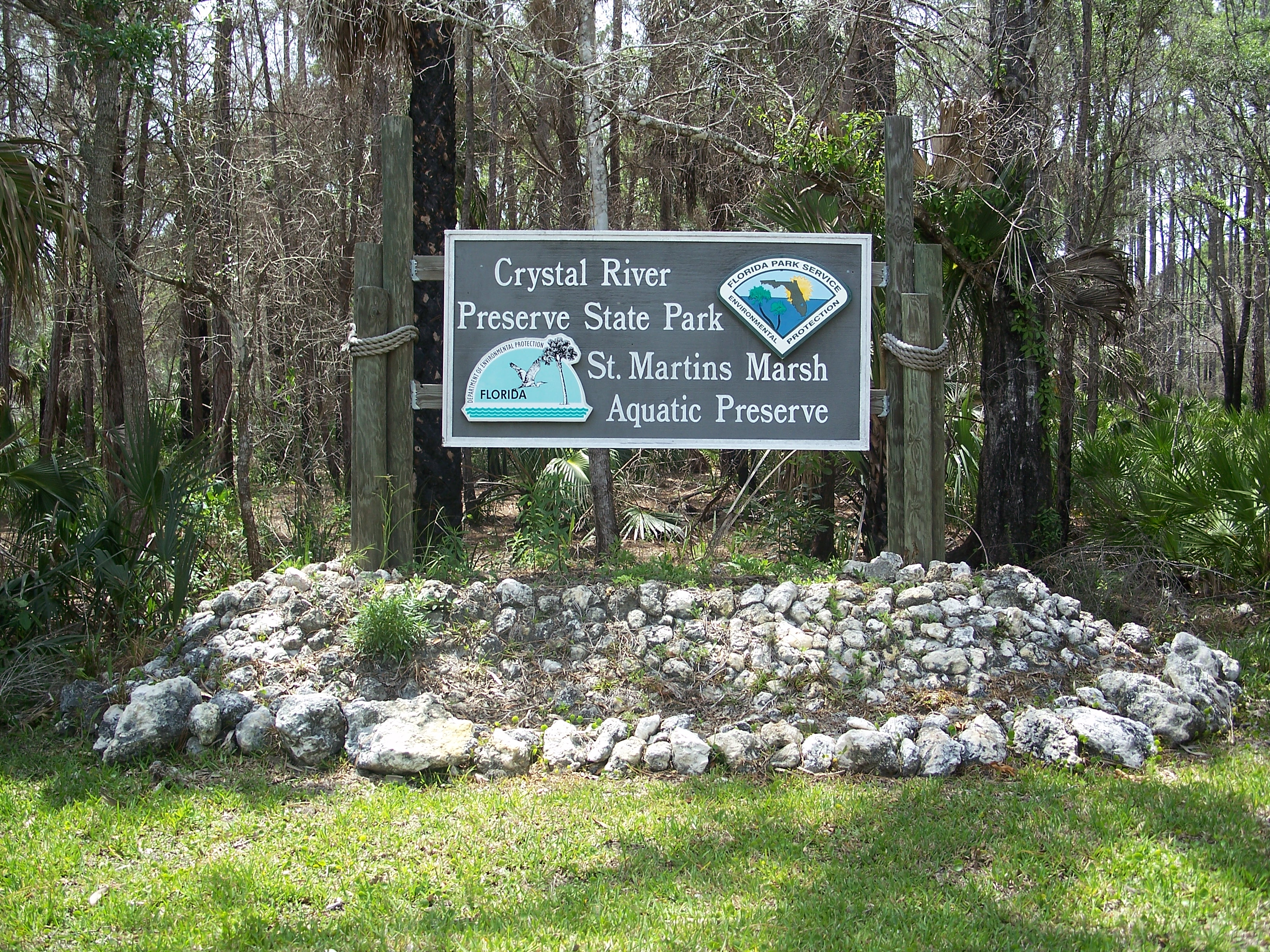
Entrance to the park

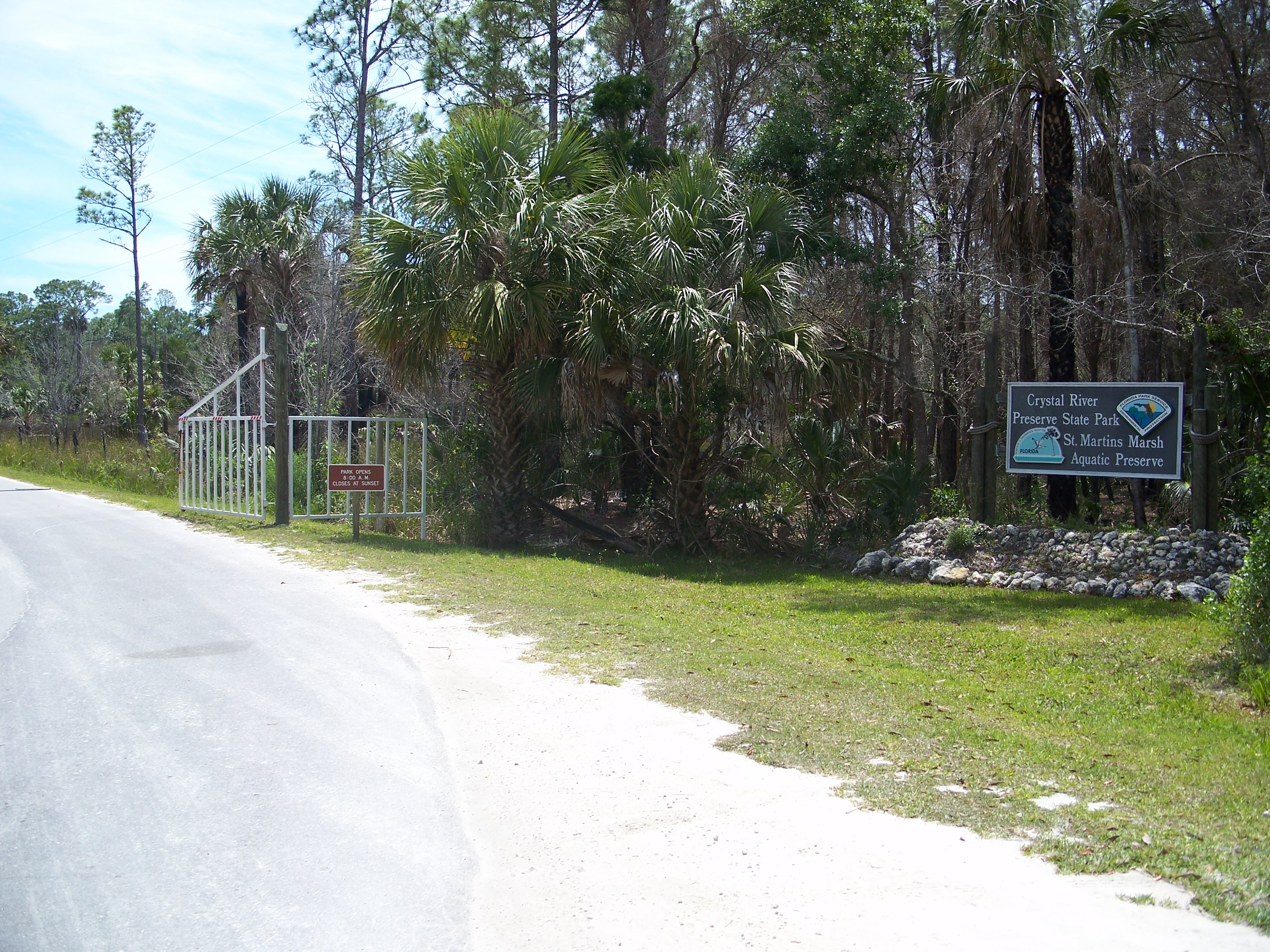
Entrance to the park

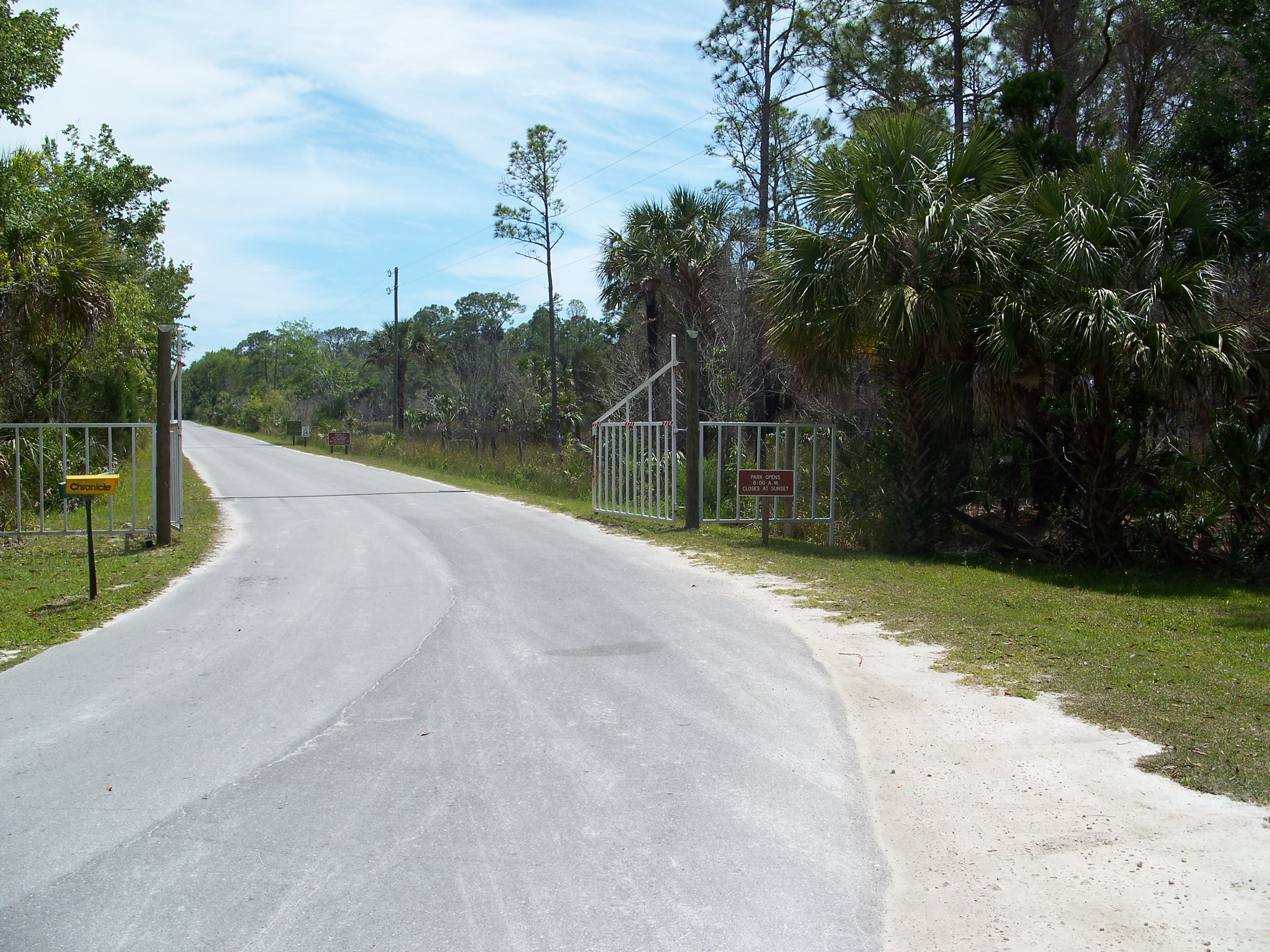
Entrance to the park
