= Tony Waldron =

British physician and bioarchaeologist (died 2021)

- Died: 2021
- Occupations: Physician and bioarchaeologist
- Known for: Palaeoepidemiology (2007); Palaeopathology (2009)

Academic background
- Education: University of Birmingham

Academic work
- Discipline: Occupational medicine; Bioarchaeology
- Sub-discipline: Palaeopathology; Palaeoepidemiology
- Institutions: University of Birmingham; London School of Hygiene & Tropical Medicine; University College London (Institute of Archaeology); Hospitals: Great Ormond Street Hospital; University College Hospital; St Mary's Hospital, London

Tony Waldron (died January 2021) was a British physician and bioarchaeologist specialising in occupational medicine, palaeopathology, and palaeoepidemiology. He was an honorary professor at the UCL Institute of Archaeology, a lecturer in occupational medicine at the London School of Hygiene & Tropical Medicine, and a consultant physician at University College Hospital and St Mary's Hospital. He wrote a number of books on bioarchaeology, including the widely used textbooks Palaeoepidemiology (2007) and Palaeopathology (2009).

== Career ==
Waldron studied medicine at the University of Birmingham and also had degrees in history and law. He was a lecturer in social medicine at Birmingham until 1978 and a senior lecturer in occupational medicine at the London School of Hygiene & Tropical Medicine from 1978 to 1988. He was appointed an honorary research fellow and lecturer at the Institute of Archaeology at University College London in 1980, and was an honorary professor there from 2004 until his death. He also held visiting professor positions at Linköping University, Uppsala University, the Shiga University of Medical Science, and Kyoto University.

As a physician, Waldron worked as a consultant at Great Ormond Street Hospital, University College Hospital (1980–1988), and St Mary's Hospital (1988–2008). In letters to The Guardian and The Times, he criticised the management of the National Health Service (NHS) for disregarding the occupational health of hospital workers, and the government for appointing non-experts to leadership roles, and ultimately left the NHS "after a reform too far".

Waldron was a founding editor of the International Journal of Osteoarchaeology and the editor of the British Journal of Industrial Medicine from 1980 to 1993. He won a Visiting Professor Award from the Alberta Heritage Foundation for Medical Research in 1983.

== Bioarchaeology ==
Waldron was an expert on palaeopathology and palaeoepidemiology, which he taught at the UCL Institute of Archaeology from 1980 to 2020. He wrote several books on the subject, including Counting the Dead: Epidemiology of Skeletal Populations (1994), A Field Guide to Joint Disease in Archaeology (1995, with Juliet Rogers), Shadows in the Soil: Human Bones and Archaeology (2001), Palaeoepidemiology: The Measure of Disease in the Human Past (2007), and Palaeopathology (2009, part of the Cambridge Manuals in Archaeology series). He was particularly interested in the history of joint disease, malignant disease, and infectious disease, and in the years before his death was studying congenital syphilis and the traces it leaves on skeletons. He studied the human remains from a number of archaeological sites in London, including West Tenter Street, Merton Priory, the East Smithfield Black Death cemetery and former abbey of St Mary Graces, St. Bride's Lower Cemetery, and the crypt at Christ Church, Spitalfields.

He also wrote several papers on the history of palaeopathology, including biographies of Roy Lee Moodie and Calvin Wells.
