= Red Bay =

Red Bay may refer to:

- Red Bay, Alabama
- Red Bay (Antarctica), a bay in Graham Land, Antarctica
- Red Bay, Newfoundland and Labrador
- Red Bay, The Bahamas
- Red Bay, County Antrim, a townland in County Antrim, Northern Ireland
- Persea borbonia, sometimes called Red Bay tree
