= Victor D. Thompson =

American archaeologist

Victor D. Thompson is an American archaeologist.

Thompson earned his bachelor's degree in archaeology at the University of Georgia, then completed graduate study in the subject at the University of Kentucky, graduating with a PhD in 2006. He is a distinguished research professor at the University of Georgia, and was elected a fellow of the American Association for the Advancement of Science in 2023. He was named director of the Georgia Museum of Natural History the following year.
