= James Conolly =

Canadian anthropologist

James Conolly is a Canadian anthropologist specialising in landscape archaeology and environmental archaeology. He is currently a professor at Trent University and the chair of the department of anthropology.

== Education and career ==
Conolly has a BA in anthropology from the University of Toronto, an MSc in geography from the University of Southampton, and an MA and PhD in archaeology from the UCL Institute of Archaeology.

He was a lecturer in archaeology at the UCL Institute of Archaeology from 1998 to 2004, then relocated to Canada to become Trent University's first Canada Research Chair in archaeology. He has worked on various archaeological excavation and regional survey projects in Greece, Turkey, Syria, the UK, the USA and Canada.

He serves on the editorial board of the World Archaeology.

== Selected publications ==
- Conolly, James; Lake, Mark (2006). Geographical Information Systems in Archaeology. Cambridge: Cambridge University Press. ISBN 9780521793308.
