= Georgia Museum of Natural History =

Museum in Athens, Georgia

Coordinates: 33.9449°N 83.3716°W

- Location: 101 Cedar Street, Athens, Georgia, United States
- Type: Natural History
- Website: Georgia Museum of Natural History

The Georgia Museum of Natural History (abbreviated as GMNH) is the U.S. state of Georgia's museum of natural history located in Athens, Georgia. The museum has eleven different collections in Anthropology, Arthropods, Botany, Geology, Herpetology, Ichthyology, Invertebrate, Mammalogy, Mycology, Ornithology, and Zooarchaeology. In addition, there are exhibitions, archives, and entertainment for children. The Exhibit Gallery is free and open to the public during scheduled hours. People can schedule a tour to visit the collections by appointment.

The museum staff deliver on thousands of information and loan requests annually. Most of these originate within Georgia from agencies such as the U.S. Fish and Wildlife Service, U.S. Geological Service, U.S. Army Corps of Engineers, U.S. Environmental Protection Agency, U.S. Forestry Service, Cooperative Extension Service, Georgia Department of Natural Resources, Georgia Forestry Commission, and Georgia Department of Transportation, as well as from private organizations and the general public.

The GMNH provides natural history education opportunities to the public and its surrounding communities in addition to assisting in research endeavors. The museum also has an Internship Program that provides University of Georgia (UGA) undergraduates with hands-on collections experience.

In 1999, GMNH was recognized as the official state museum of natural history by the Georgia General Assembly.

== History ==
The museum was formally recognized by the university in 1978 as the Museum of Natural History. It was renamed as it the Georgia Museum of Natural History in 1999. However, some of the items in its collections were obtained in the early 19th century. The museum's earlier history has recently been uncovered. In 1801, Josiah Meigs started gathering items for a natural history collection at UGA. Henry Jackson contributed minerals and scientific equipment from France in 1817, and in 1824 a collection of minerals was donated, which prompted the need for a mineralogical cabinet.

UGA's Philosophical Hall, built in 1821, was the first official house of the museum. New College was built in 1823 to accommodate the growing collections, so it housed the collections until 1830 when a fire destroyed the building and everything in it.

Malthus Ward established the Botanical Garden at the university in 1831, and James Jackson continued to contribute to the Botanical Garden after Ward retired.

The university put forth $500 for a new mineralogical cabinet in the newly built Ivy Building in 1832. In 1834, a natural history professor got $150 for the collection of plants for the Botanical Garden and also increased the mineral collection. The mineral collection in particular grew rapidly in the late 1830s, but not much changed with the museum in the 1940s.

In 1856 the Botanical Gardens were sold, and the money was used to build the iron fence and famous Arch that still surrounds UGA's North Campus today.

The Library Building was built in 1859 near the Ivy Building, and the museum collections were moved to the 3rd floor of the new building in 1862, alongside many murals. Throughout the 1860s and 1870s, the collections grew so large that they became a difficult task to accommodate.

UGA Chancellor Andrew Lipscomb contributed to the ornithology collection and worked closely with Dr. Wilson, one of the museum's staff members, to clean and stuff specimens for the collections. The museum was sent many small donations of antiquities and other items, such as George R. Gilmer's gift of his library and mineral cabinet in 1866. And, in 1880 the Claiborne fossils were added to the museum's collection.

The museum's natural history collection numbered well over 300 specimens by 1880, and it encompasses more than 7 to 8 million specimens today. The museum's history between 1900 and 1978 is largely unknown, but the groundwork for further research into it has been laid.

== Education and outreach ==
The GMNH Education and Outreach Program provides events, exhibits, Science Boxes, workshops, tours, and more to its surrounding community in order to answer the public's questions about the natural world that surrounds them.

The Science Box Project provides materials such as artifacts, posters, games, videos, books, and other objects on a specific topic in natural history to K-8 teachers.

Tours of the museum and/or its collections are offered to special interest groups and schools in the region.

The GMNH website also provides virtual slide shows of the Habitats of Georgia under the Education tab to inform the site's visitors about the different diverse regions and the environmental issues the different habitats face.

The Friends of the GMNH also play a role in supporting the museum's education and outreach initiatives through fundraising, raising awareness, and more.

== Internship program ==
The GMNH offers an internship program for the University of Georgia's undergraduate students to gain experience working with the museum collections in the fall, spring, and summer semesters. Interns earn either 3 or 4 credit hours and can fulfill UGA's Experiential Learning requirement through the program. Collections available for internships are Archaeology, Entomology, Geology, Herbarium, Herpetology, Ichthyology, Invertebrate, Mammalogy, Mycology, and Ornithology. The number of interns accepted for each collection is limited, and some collections may not take interns in a given semester. Interns learn about natural history museums and collections by working closely with GMNH staff for a total of roughly 105 hours over the semester. They participate in museum activities such as collection, identification, preparation, categorization, and curation.They can also participate in tours, outreach presentations, field trips, exhibition preparation, and other special events.

== Collections ==
Each of the museum's collections are the largest of its kind in Georgia, and the collections are linked by GMNH to research, public service, and educational programs. The specimens in the collections are important for student and professional research and for public edification, as it is visited by roughly 100 scientists that use the collections in their research. Each collection is professionally managed by specialists. GMNH provides information and specimen loans to researchers worldwide.

The Anthropology Collection is made up of pottery and various remains, adding up to a total of over 3 million artifacts and specimens, making it the most extensive in the state. The collection is housed in the Archaeology Laboratory, which is part of the UGA Department of Anthropology.

The Arthropods Collection is part of the Entomology Department at UGA, and it houses more than 1 million pinned and alcohol-preserved insect specimens. The majority of the collection is from the southeast U.S. and is determined to a species.

The Botany Collection is one of the largest collections of plant samples in the southeastern United States. Agencies and persons throughout the nation turn to this Department of Plant Biology Herbarium for identification assistance. This Herbarium is part of the UGA Department of Plant Biology.

The Geology Collection is made up of three smaller collections: the Allard Collection for Economic Geology, the Mineralogy Collection, and the Paleontology Collection. Together, these collections comprise over 33,500 specimens, fossils, and casts, and the Allard Collection is available online. The Geology Collection is part of the UGA Department of Geology.

The Herpetology Collection began being organized in 1940 and now houses over 46,000 reptile and amphibian specimens that comprise most of the species in the Southeast.

The Ichthyology Collection started growing in the 1940s and now houses over 825 different species of fish in over 325,000 bottled specimens. These alcohol-preserved tissues provide greater accessibility for evaluation of genomic diversity in these specimens. The Collection includes multiple endangered or rare freshwater fish from the Southeast.

The Invertebrate Collection houses over 10,000 freshwater mussels along with multiple catalogued non-insects and a diverse collection from Gray's Reef. While newer specimens are available for genomic work, many of the Collection's specimens are extinct or endangered.

The Mammalogy Collection started in the 1940s and thus contains specimens from the early 1900s that provide a better historical lens into the mammals of the state over time. The Collection houses over 25,000 specimens such as skins, skeletal material, and preserved mammals, and it's one of the few mammal collections accredited by the American Society of Mammalogists.

The Mycology Collection houses over 30,000 specimens of fungi from the Southeast and other parts of the world and is particularly rich in ascomycetes of Georgia and the tropical Americas. This Mycological Herbarium is an internationally recognized repository for research projects conducted by the U.S. Department of Agriculture, and it's one of the few significant collections of its kind in the country.

The Ornithology Collection was formed in the 1940s but began being collected before then, and it now houses over 5,650 specimens of mostly study skins in addition to 800 bird egg clutches from around the world. The specimens are collected mainly from previously rural and now urban areas of Georgia and partly from areas under siege due to destruction of rainforests in Central America.

The Zooarchaeology Collection is used to identify animal remains for universities, museums, and government agencies throughout the Southeast, the Caribbean, and South America. It houses over 4,100 fish, amphibian, reptile, bird, and mammal skeletal specimens. This Zooarchaeology Laboratory is part of the UGA Department of Anthropology.

== See also ==
- Elizabeth Reitz
