= Elizabeth Reitz =

Zooarchaeologist

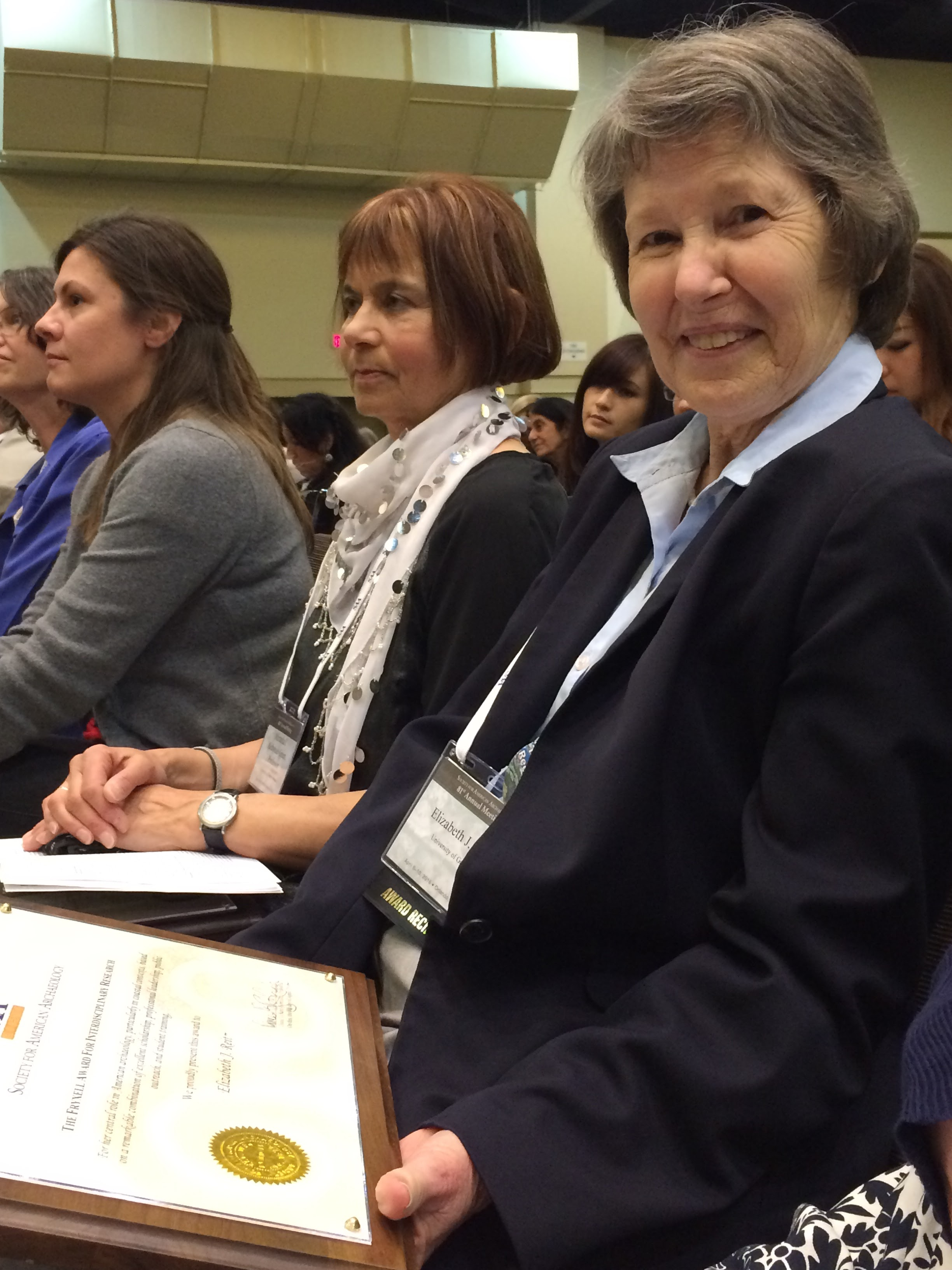
Elizabeth Reitz holding Fryxell Award

Elizabeth Jean "Betsy" Reitz is a zooarchaeologist and Professor Emerita in the Georgia Museum of Natural History and the Department of Anthropology at the University of Georgia. She was born in 1946 in Lake Alfred, Florida. She attended Florida Presbyterian College (now Eckerd College) from 1966 to 1967. She received her BA (1969), MA (1975), and her PhD (1979) in Anthropology from the University of Florida. Her dissertation was directed by Elizabeth Wing. Reitz is a member of the International Council for Archaeozoology's Committee of Honor. In 2012, she was elected a Fellow of the American Association for the Advancement of Science, and in 2014, she was named to the American Academy of Arts and Sciences. She was the recipient of the 2016 Fryxell Award for Interdisciplinary Research in Archaeology, given by the Society for American Archaeology. The Fryxell Award is given to scholars who have made significant contributions in the application of the zoological sciences in archaeology. She is a member of the Committee of Honor of the International Council for Zooarchaeology (ICAZ). In 2019, Reitz was awarded the Southeastern Archaeological Conference's Lifetime Achievement Award.

"Reitz has worked throughout Latin America, the Caribbean, and the southeastern United States, studying vertebrate remains from coastal archaeological sites dating from the late Pleistocene era into the 20th century." Her work includes collaborations with local residents of areas in which she is working as well as overseeing a large (over 4200 specimen) zooarchaeological collection in the Georgia Museum of Natural History.

A reviewer for the Canadian Journal of Archaeology praised Reitz and Wing's book, Zooarchaeology as "the best available introductory text on the subject for undergraduate students".

She has been credited for having "done more than any other individual to advance the subfield of historical zooarchaeology".

Lyman notes that she is a "vocal advocate for using bone weight allometry as a measure of taxonomic abundance".

== Selected publications ==
- Reitz, Elizabeth J. (1993). "Zooarchaeology". In Jay K. Johnson (ed.). The Development of Southeastern Archaeology. University of Alabama Press. pp. 109–131. ISBN 9780817306007.
- Elizabeth Reitz; C. Margaret Scarry; Sylvia J. Scudder, eds. (2007). Case Studies in Environmental Archaeology. Interdisciplinary Contributions to Archaeology (2 ed.). Springer. ISBN 978-0387713021.
- Reitz, Elizabeth J.; Wing, Elizabeth S. (2008). Zooarchaeology. Cambridge Manuals in Archaeology (2 ed.). Cambridge University Press. ISBN 978-0521857260.
- Reitz, Elizabeth J.; Pavao-Zuckerman, Barnet; Weinand, Daniel; Duncan, Gwyneth A. C. (2010). Mission and Pueblo of Santa Catalina de Guale, St. Catherines Island, Georgia: A Comparative Zooarchaeological Analysis. American Museum of Natural History Anthropological Papers. North American Archaeology Fund, AMNH. hdl:2246/6036. ISBN 978-1939302175.
- Elizabeth J. Reitz; Irvy R. Quitmyer; David Hurst Thomas, eds. (2012). Seasonality and Human Mobility Along the Georgia Bight. American Museum of Natural History Anthropological Papers. North American Archaeology Fund, AMNH. hdl:2246/6164. ISBN 978-1939302212.
- Zierden, Martha A.; Reitz, Elizabeth J. (2016). Charleston: An Archaeology of Life in a Coastal Community. University Press of Florida. ISBN 978-0813062907.
