= Ripley P. Bullen =

American archaeologist (born 1902)

- Born: Ripley Pierce Bullen; September 21, 1902; Winthrop, Massachusetts, U.S.
- Died: 25 December 1976 (aged 74); Gainesville, Florida
- Occupation: Archaeologist
- Years active: 1940–1976
- Known for: Archaeology of Florida and the Caribbean
- Works: Selected book, monographs, and articles
- Spouse: Adelaide Kendall Bullen
- Children: 2
- Family: Dana Bullen (son)
- Awards: Awards and honors

Ripley Pierce Bullen (1902–1976) was Curator Emeritus at the Florida Museum of Natural History at the University of Florida, where he was the Department Chair of Social Sciences for a period of seventeen years (1956–1973). He was an archaeologist primarily associated with the Southeastern United States and Florida, and in his later years he was known as the "dean of Floridian archaeology". He also completed fieldwork in the American Southwest, the New England states, Central America, and the Greater and Lesser Antilles.

== Early and personal life ==
Ripley Pierce Bullen was born September 21, 1902, in Winthrop, Massachusetts. His parents were Dana Ripley Bullen and Bessie Louise Pierce. He had a humble childhood growing up in the Bay State. Referred to as "Rip" by his childhood friends, a name that would stick with him throughout his life, Bullen was always known for his enthusiasm towards anything that he pursued.

Bullen met his life partner, Adelaide Kendall, while working in Massachusetts. Adelaide Kendall was a cultural and physical anthropologist. A few years later, in 1929, they married. The couple raised two sons, Dana Ripley II and Pierce Kendall. Bullen was also a grandfather of four. Mrs. Bullen worked alongside her husband on numerous projects including the founding of their publishing company, Kendall Books. She also researched and wrote articles with her husband.

== Education and early career ==
At an early age Bullen was interested in both archaeology and engineering. He attended Schenectady High School in New York, graduating in 1921, after which he attended Cornell University, where he received a master's degree in mechanical engineering in 1925. Later that year, Bullen landed his first job with General Electric. Over the next decade he worked in their engineering research department before he transitioned into sales for General Electric, where he worked in New York and Massachusetts for a few years.

During his tenure at GE, Bullen continued his fascination with archaeology. Finding time between being a father and his paying job at GE, he managed to participate in his first excavation at a steatite quarry in 1939. Bullen's first jump into professional archeology was as an organizer for the Massachusetts Archaeological Society, where he would give numerous presentations about his work and findings to that organization and at meetings of the Society for American Archaeology.

== Archeological career ==
In 1940, after working for the General Electric Company for fifteen years, Bullen left his job to professionally pursue archaeology. He worked for the Robert S. Peabody Foundation for Archaeology at Phillips Academy in Andover, Massachusetts, for the next eight years. While in that position, Bullen took part in the University of New Mexico's archaeology field school studies in Chaco Canyon. He also worked towards a doctorate in anthropology and served as a Teaching Fellow for two years at Harvard University. Bullen rose to some prominence through his many published articles during his time with the Robert S. Peabody Foundation, where he created the basic cultural chronology for eastern Massachusetts.

In 1948 Bullen and his family made the long move south to Florida, where he accepted an offer to become an assistant archaeologist for the Florida Board of Park and Historic Memorials. A few years later, the Florida Museum of Natural History established an Anthropology Department, and Bullen became its first archaeologist. With the creation of the department, many of Bullen's excavation collections as well as other collections and records from the Florida Park Service were relocated to the Museum of Natural History.

In 1956, Bullen accepted the chairmanship of the Department of Social Sciences at the Florida Museum of Natural History. While chairing the department, Bullen participated in a number of excavations sponsored by the William L. Bryant Foundation and the National Park Service in St. John and St. Thomas in the U.S. Virgin Islands. Bullen published several articles and monographs on the islands' prehistory and became one of the first archaeologists to study and excavate in the Caribbean islands. Some of Bullen's compiled collections from his work are still housed in the Florida Museum of Natural History.

A few years later, Bullen began to compile research for a projectile point guide of Florida's prehistoric cultures, which was first published in 1968. This became his most notable and most widely cited work.

Bullen guided the department as chairman for seventeen years until his retirement in 1973. Although officially retired, he continued to work and was honored as Curator Emeritus at the University of Florida in 1976. The "Bullen Medal for outstanding future anthropologists" was established in his honor by the University of Florida.

From 1970 to 1976, Bullen became the head editor of the Florida Anthropological Society's journal, the Florida Anthropologist. He was the editor of the organization's journal until his death on December 25, 1976. In addition to being editor of a major anthropological journal, Bullen was the author of more than two hundred books, monographs and articles.

== Bullen projectile point typology ==
In the late 1960s Bullen began developing his point typology of Floridian prehistory to aid fellow archaeologists with point classification. The first report of Bullen's Florida projectile point classification was presented to the Florida Anthropological Society in 1967. The presentation went so well that the projectile point classification system which started as a reference guide grew to a small monograph and was then published by the Florida Museum of Natural History in 1968. In the introduction of his collection, Bullen stated, "students of projectile points wished considerably more detailed information than had been originally contemplated. At the risk of making this guide too lengthy, the author has tried to please all, partially if not completely" (Bullen 1968:2).

The first edition recognized a wide range of projectile point types. The number continued to grow as Bullen continued his research on the subject. In 1975, with much more researched point types, Bullen published the second edition of his point guide through Kendall Books, a company formed together with his wife. The Bullen Projectile Point Typology remains a key tool for Florida and southeastern archaeologists.

== Award and honors ==
In March 1976, Bullen was awarded a degree of Doctorate of Science by the University of Florida. This honorary degree was in recognition of his many contributions to the archaeological world, especially work completed in Florida and for the university. In the same year the Ripley P. Bullen award, sometimes referred to as the Bullen Medal, was established by the University of Florida to honor outstanding students within the archeological field. The Bullen Award is given in honor of Ripley P. Bullen for his work with the Florida Museum. The recipients of the Bullen Award are chosen by the Florida Museum's university teaching committee. The award is bestowed to students involved with or conducting museum based research for excellence in research of the anthropology of Florida and the Caribbean Basin.

== Selected books, monographs and articles ==
- "Instructions for the site survey". 1939. (Ripley P. Bullen). Bulletin of the Massachusetts Archaeological Society 1(1):8-10.
- "The Dolly Bond steatite quarry". 1940. (Ripley P. Bullen). Bulletin of the Massachusetts Archaeological Society 2(1):14-22.
- "Further notes on the Dolly Bond steatite quarry". 1940. (Ripley P. Bullen). Society for American Archaeology, Notebook, November, pp. 158–160.
- "An anthropological world". 1942. (Ripley P. Bullen). American Anthropologist 44:525-526.
- "A proposed Massachusetts projectile point classification". 1943. (Ripley P. Bullen). Bulletin of the Massachusetts Archaeological Society 4:45-47.
- "Suggestions of stratigraphy in eastern Massachusetts". 1946. (Ripley P. Bullen). Bulletin of the Massachusetts Archaeological Society 7:54-59.
- "Excavations in Northeastern Massachusetts" 1949 (Ripley P. Bullen). Papers of the Robert S. Peabody Foundation for Archaeology, Philips Academy, Andover, Massachusetts.
- "The Safety Harbor site, Pinellas County, Florida". 1950. (Ripley P. Bullen and J.W. Griffin). Florida Anthropological Society, Publications 2. (42 pp.)
- "The Johns Island site, Hernando County, Florida". 1950. (A.K. Bullen and Ripley P. Bullen). American Antiquity 16:23-45.
- "History along route AlA". 1951. (Ripley P. Bullen). Florida Highways 19(9):22-23.
- "Certain small triangular arrow points". 1951. (Ripley P. Bullen). Bulletin of the Massachusetts Archaeological Society 12:64-66.
- "An archaeological survey of Amelia Island, Florida". 1952. (Ripley P. Bullen and J.W. Griffin). Florida Anthropologist 5:37-64.
- "The famous Crystal River site". 1953. (Ripley P. Bullen). Florida Anthropologist 6:9-37.
- "The transitional period of Florida". 1959. (Ripley P. Bullen). Southeastern Archaeological Conference, Newsletter 6:43-53, 59–62.
- "Ceramic periods of St. Thomas and St. John islands, Virgin Islands". 1962. (Ripley P. Bullen). The William L. Bryant Foundation, American Studies, Report 4.
- "Archaeological research at Grenada, West Indies". 1964. (Ripley P. Bullen). American Philosophical Society, Yearbook 1963, pp. 511–514.
- "Archaeological chronology of Grenada". 1965. (Ripley P. Bullen). American Antiquity 31:237-241.
- "Florida West Coast from Crystal River south". In "The transition from Archaic to Woodland: a symposium." 1966. (Ripley P. Bullen). Southeastern Archaeological Conference Newsletter 10:10-11.
- "Two ancient Florida dugout canoes". 1967. (Ripley P. Bullen and H.K. Brooks). Quarterly Journal of the Florida Academy of Sciences 30:97-107.
- A guide to the identification of Florida projectile points. 1968. (Ripley P. Bullen). Florida State Museum, Gainesville, Florida. (50 pp.)
- "Beveled stemmed points from Tampa Bay". 1969. (Ripley P. Bullen). Florida Anthropologist 21:89-90.
- "A worked mammoth bone from Florida". 1970. (Ripley P. Bullen, S.D. Webb and B.I. Waller). American Antiquity 35:203-205.
- "Archaeology: Caribbean area". Handbook of Latin American Studies. 1971. (Ripley P. Bullen). University of Florida Press, Gainesville. 33:61-66.
- "The Sarasota County Mound, Englewood, Florida". 1971. (Ripley P. Bullen). Florida Anthropologist 24:1-30.
- "An engraving tool from north Florida". 1972. (Ripley P. Bullen and M.T. Wallace). Florida Anthropologist 25:131-132.
- "The Orange period of peninsular Florida". In Fiber-tempered pottery in southeastern United States and northern Columbia: its origins, context, and significance. 1972. (Ripley P. Bullen). Florida Anthropological Society, Publications 6:9-33.
- "Pre-Columbian dogs in the Lesser and Greater Antilles". Proceedings of the Fifth International Congress for the Study of Pre-Columbian Cultures of the Lesser Antilles, Antigua. 1974. (Ripley P. Bullen and M. Mattioni). pp. 162–165.
- "Were there pre-Columbian cultural contacts between Florida and the West Indies: the archaeological evidence". 1974. (Ripley P. Bullen). Florida Anthropologist 27:149-160.
- A guide to the identification of Florida projectile points. 1975. (Ripley P. Bullen). Kendall Books, Gainesville. (62 pp.)
- "Culture areas and climaxes in Antillean prehistory". Proceedings of the Sixth International Congress for the Study of Pre-Columbian Cultures of the Lesser Antilles, Guadeloupe. 1976. (Ripley P. Bullen and A.K. Bullen). pp. 1–10.
- "Pre-Columbian trade in eastern United States as viewed from Florida". 1978. (Ripley P. Bullen). Florida Anthropologist 31:92-108.

== See also ==
- Bullen Projectile Point Typology Collection
