= Mary Hayes Davis =

American writer and newspaper publisher

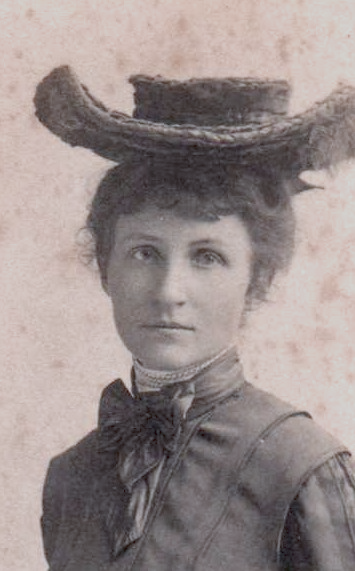
- Born: c. 1884; West Virginia, U.S.
- Died: May 18, 1948 (aged 63–64); Fort Myers, Florida, U.S.
- Known for: Chinese Fables and Folk Stories; The Hendry County News; Dixie Crystal Theatre

Mary Hayes Davis (c. 1884 – May 18, 1948) was an American writer, a newspaper editor and publisher, and the owner of several movie theaters. She is best known as the co-author of Chinese Fables and Folk Stories, which she wrote with Reverend Chow Leung, while based in Chicago. Published in 1908 and widely reprinted today, the compilation claimed to be “the first book of Chinese stories ever printed in English”. Between 1908 and 1912, Davis collected Native American folk tales from the Pima and Apache tribes in Oklahoma and Arizona, for a book she never completed. In the early 1920s, Davis moved to southwest Florida, where she published The Hendry County News, and later owned and operated a chain of seven movie theaters. In 1926, The Tampa Tribune called Davis "the heroine of LaBelle" for her courageous reporting of the lynching of Henry Patterson, despite threats of further mob violence. In 1928, The Hendry County News received the Florida Newspaper Association award for Best Community News Service. In 1998, the Dixie Crystal Theatre in Clewiston, which Davis had opened in 1941, was listed in the National Register of Historic Places.

== Early life and education ==
Mary Hayes Davis was born around 1884 in West Virginia, and grew up on a farm. She also lived in Kansas. She attended college for one year and was widowed.

== Chinese Fables and Folk Stories ==
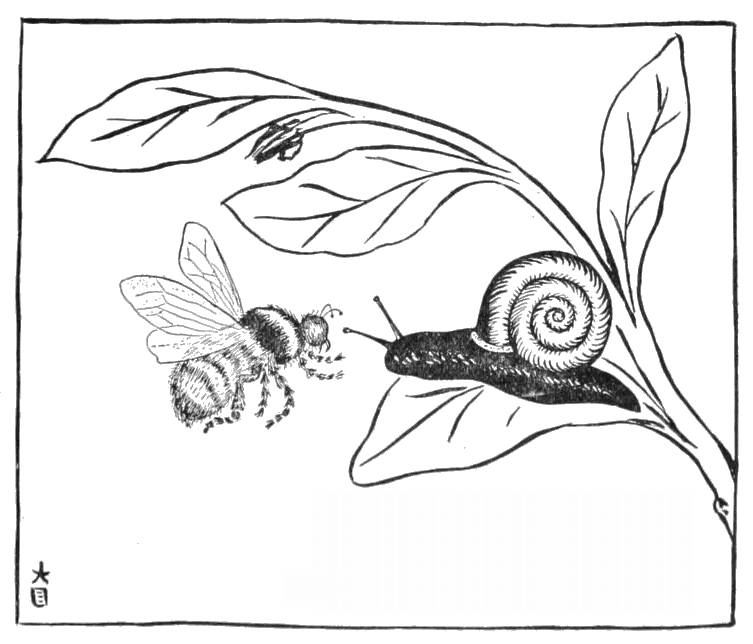
Illustration from "The Snail and the Bees" from Chinese Fables and Folk Stories

In the early 1900s, Davis received on-the-job training in Chicago as a reporter and features writer for one of the major daily newspapers. Her reporting brought her into contact with people from "old" Chinatown, including Reverend Chow Leung, pastor of the Central Baptist Chinese Mission.

Around this time, a widely syndicated newspaper article had stated, "There is no perfect collection of Chinese fables." Davis was intrigued when she discovered that Chinese folktales did in fact exist. As they were developing the book, Chow Leung narrated the stories to her in pidgin English, and occasionally sought help from an interpreter. She had also learned some Chinese herself.

In the preface to Chinese Fables and Folk Stories, Davis called Chow Leung "an invaluable collaborator" and thanked him for his patience in answering her many questions. Davis dedicated Chinese Fables and Folk Stories to her friend, Mary F. Nixon-Roulet, who was working on a similar collection of Japanese folktales in Chicago around the same time, also published by American Book Company. Wang Tsen-Zan of the University of Chicago wrote the introduction for the book, explaining that it was the first compilation of Chinese fables of its kind translated into English.

Following its publication in 1908, Chinese Fables and Folk Stories received extensive nationwide media coverage, immediately recognized as a "novelty". The book was particularly well received by education journals. The Journal of Education called Chinese Fables and Folk Stories "a delightful little reader", while The Elementary School Teacher commended the co-authors for their efforts in providing "glimpses" into "a different life". By 1911, the book was being used by Chicago public schools as a supplemental reader.

== Other books ==
Davis published two additional books in 1908: In the Realm of Make-Believe and Other Fairy Tales in Rhyme, a collection of illustrated children's stories from books that were out-of-print, and Cat Tales and Kitten Tails, Volume I. Mary Hayes Davis wrote the verses for Cat Tales and Kitten Tails, while her co-author Jennie Van Allen wrote the stories. Published by the Argus Press, Cat Tales was "dedicated to the memories of some of the most beautiful cats that have ever lived". The Los Angeles Herald called Cat Tales a "beautiful book" featuring "cat stories of every sort" which "exemplify the intelligence of these animals and their loyalty to friends or their mistresses."

Following the success of Chinese Fables and Folk Stories, Davis began her next project on Native American folklore. Dr. Carlos Montezuma, a Native American activist based in Chicago, introduced her to his contacts in the Pima and Apache tribes. Between 1908 and 1912, Davis made several visits to Oklahoma and Arizona to collect stories. Although she wrote a series of American Indian tales, the book was never published.

== Life in Chicago, Pittsburgh, and St. Louis ==
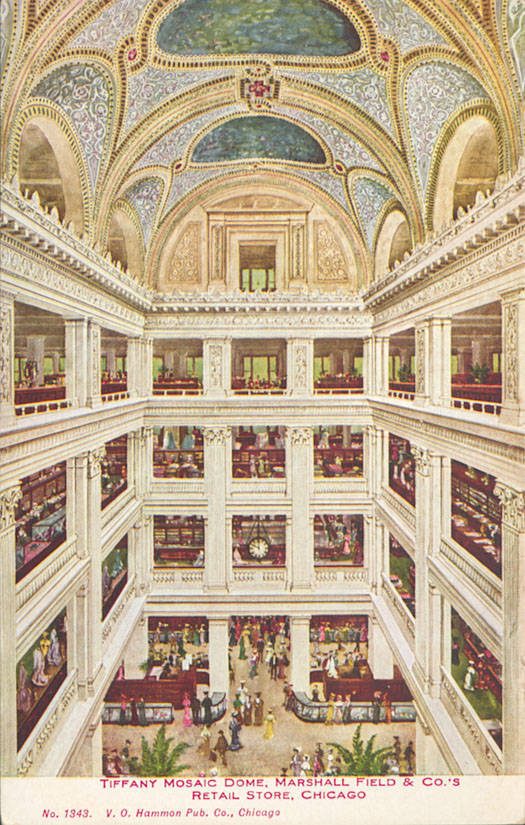
Marshall Field department store, Chicago

During her years in Chicago, Mary Hayes Davis worked as an advertising agent for Marshall Field's department store, in addition to working as a journalist. She was an elected officer in the Chicago Press League, and was active in the Social Economics Club. A member of the Chicago chapter of the Cat Fanciers' Association, she had a cream-colored Persian cat named Wu Tingfang. Named after the Chinese ambassador to the United States, her cat won a blue ribbon in 1909.

Davis then moved to Pittsburgh, Pennsylvania, where she was a senior copywriter for Kaufmann's department store. In 1914, she started a businesswomen's club with 400 members from Kaufmann's. She also became a member of the Women's Press Club of Pittsburgh.

After that, Davis lived in St. Louis, Missouri, where she was a copywriter for another major department store, and had a stint with the Associated Press. She was a member of the Women's Advertising Club of St. Louis, and helped to raise money for the St. Louis Symphony Orchestra.

She left St. Louis due to illness and spent some time in Kansas, followed by two years in Oklahoma, where she lived on a farm and continued to write.

== Newspaper publishing in Florida ==
Davis moved to Florida during the "land boom" of the 1920s, intending to buy an orange grove and retire. From 1922 to 1923, she worked as the associate editor of the Polk County Record, a newspaper published twice a week in Bartow, Florida. When the editor-in-chief became ill, she served as acting editor. Over a six-month period, her editorials and "Smilin' Thru" column became popular, and were republished throughout the state.

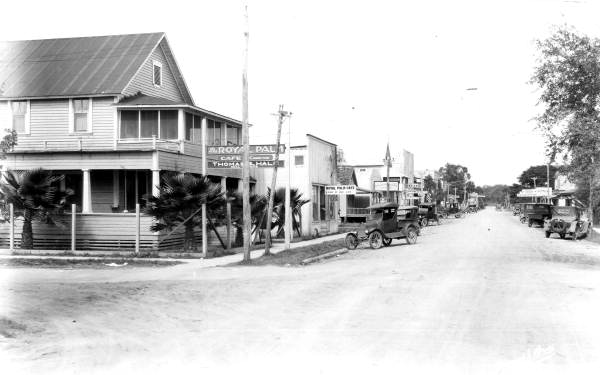
Royal Palm Hotel, LaBelle, Florida (1925)

In 1923, she accepted a position at The Fort Myers Press, but changed her mind on her way to Fort Myers, when her bus stopped for dinner in LaBelle, Florida. Fascinated by a picture of E. E. Goodno's local ranch, she started speaking to the owner of the hotel in LaBelle, who promptly offered her a salary of $100 a month to serve as publicity agent and secretary of the Chamber of Commerce at LaBelle.

Within months, she purchased the local newspaper, and became editor and publisher of The Hendry County News, also known as LaBelle News. At The Hendry County News, Davis wrote news articles and editorials, sold advertisements, and did the layout. She eventually employed a linotype operator, but did the rest of the work at the newspaper herself. Her perseverance despite frequent flooding in the area, prior to the construction of the dike at Lake Okeechobee, earned her the nickname "Mrs. Noah".

One of Davis's columns, "In the Realm of Make Believe", was written for children. Content from The Hendry County News was syndicated to other Florida newspapers such as The Tampa Tribune and The Fort Myers Press. In 1928, The Hendry County News received the Florida Newspaper Association award for Best Community News Service at its annual convention. In 1933, she sold the newspaper to Keathley Bowden, who ran The Clewiston News. (Note: On May 12, 1927, The Tampa Tribune announced that Mary Hayes Davis had sold The Hendry County News to L. A. Morgan, but she resumed as editor, publisher, and owner of the newspaper soon afterwards.)

=== Coverage of lynching in LaBelle ===
On May 11, 1926, an African American man named Henry Patterson was murdered by a mob of between 40 and 60 men in LaBelle. The mob violence was triggered by a misunderstanding with Mrs. Bennett Crawford, who saw him approach her house and started screaming. The mob shot Patterson several times without killing him. Patterson managed to break away and staggered to the door of the offices of The Hendry County News as he was chased. Mary Hayes Davis, who was standing in the doorway, told him, "Man, I cannot help you. Pray to your God." As Patterson ran away and tried to climb a wire fence, he was shot again and fell. Still alive, he was dragged down the main street in LaBelle, as he was kicked and maimed. Upon reaching the town's new courthouse, Patterson was hanged from a tree and shot yet again.

Davis was warned repeatedly not to report on the story. Her office door had circles of blood drawn on it, with a chisel thrust through. Nevertheless, she went ahead and published in-depth coverage of the incident, as well as editorials condemning mob violence. Commending her actions following the threats, The Tampa Tribune wrote:

What did Mary Hayes Davis do? In the next issue of her paper, she printed on the first page, a graphic description of the gruesome work of the mob – a story showing it to have been one of the most unprovoked, brutal and cowardly crimes of its kind ever committed in this or any other country, in this or any other period of the world's history. She printed double-column editorials denouncing the mob and demanding that its members be brought to justice. At the same time, she was loyal enough to her community to say that the outrage did not represent the best citizenship of LaBelle and that LaBelle's representative men, as a rule, deprecated and deplored it. So, Florida newspaperdom furnishes the shining example of a woman publisher who cannot be intimidated by threats or deterred by menacing violence from doing her duty to the public. Will she be made to suffer? ... At any rate, we may well applaud Mary Hayes Davis and wish her more power in her brave stand against lawlessness.

On November 29, 1926, Mary Hayes Davis was one of 21 witnesses called to testify on the first day of the trial against the men accused of participating in the lynching. Although the lynchers ultimately went unpunished, the grand jury criticized Sheriff Dan L. McLaughlin for his failure to protect Henry Patterson and recommended his removal from office.

== Movie theater business ==
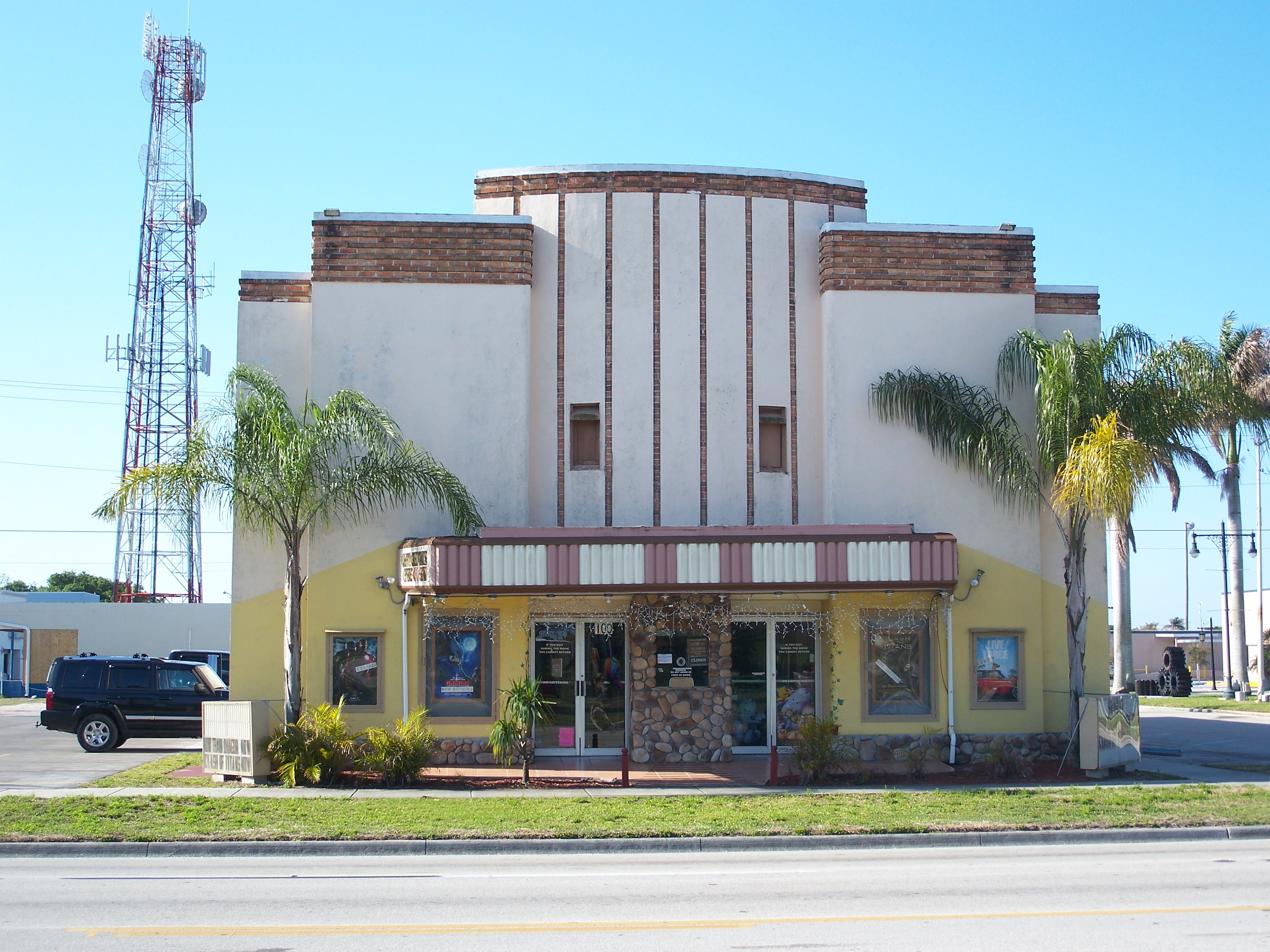
Dixie Crystal Theatre

In 1923, Mary Hayes Davis opened the first movie theater in Hendry County, in a tin building next to her newspaper office in LaBelle, featuring $1,000-worth of "opera chairs". The first film shown was a Western. On opening night, hunters, fur trappers, and cattle ranchers filled the theater, some of whom had never seen a motion picture before. As the villain galloped across the screen, two shots rang out in the theater. Davis was left with two bullet holes in the silver screen, where an audience member had shot the villain.

Her initial success inspired others to follow suit, leading Davis to lament in 1927 that "LaBelle which is credited with being the smallest town in the United States with two moving picture shows is now to have a third." Soon Davis commissioned a new movie theatre to be built in LaBelle. In 1928, she opened her new LaBelle Theatre, in a two-story building with a painted mural of the Florida coast surrounding the screen. There, she showed the first talking picture in Hendry County in September 1931.

In 1934, she built the original Dixie Crystal Theatre in Clewiston, a masonry vernacular building north of Sugarland Highway. Its name was a tribute to the local sugar industry. In 1940, Davis commissioned architect Chester A. Cone to design a new theater, with Earl Anderson as the contractor. The new Dixie Crystal Theatre opened in 1941 and was located at the corner of Sugarland Highway and Central Avenue, a unique one-story building in the Moderne style of architecture. She also built a 300-seat movie theater in the Harlem district of Clewiston for African Americans. The Harlem Theater was bombed with dynamite, which delayed its opening in 1938. Davis's theaters in Clewiston did well as the local community began to thrive.

In 1935, she took over the movie theater in Pompano Beach. In addition, she built a movie theater in Moore Haven, and operated theaters in Naples and Venice. Around 1942, she built a movie theater at Fort Myers Beach in a modern stucco building, which she ran on a seasonal basis, closing during the summer. At one point, she owned a chain of seven theaters. She was also a frequent contributor of film reviews to Motion Picture Herald.

She died at her home in Fort Myers, Florida, on May 18, 1948. In 1998, the Dixie Crystal Theatre was added to the National Register of Historic Places in Hendry County, Florida.

== Written works ==
=== Books ===
- Chinese Fables and Folk Stories, with Chow Leung (Wikisource)
- In the Realm of Make-Believe and Other Fairy Tales in Rhyme
- Cat Tales and Kitten Tails, Vol. I, with Jennie Van Allen

=== Correspondence ===
- Letter to Carlos Montezuma, 1908 (CARLI Digital Collections)

=== Articles ===
- The News of Hendry County, 1926 (Excerpt from Lynching in LaBelle)
