= Lien Pao-Tsai =

Taiwanese female artist

Lien Pao-Tsai (Chinese: 連寶猜; born 1953) is a Taiwanese potter whose artistic development spans early childhood, her university years, and her later life alongside her husband, also a potter. A significant figure in the evolution of contemporary Taiwanese ceramics, she has worked across many forms and techniques, incorporating mixed media and exploring themes drawn from social issues, the environment, and human emotion. Since 1982, Lien has presented both solo and group exhibitions in Taiwan and internationally. Her works are held in museum collections at home and abroad, and she has received major awards in Taiwan and Italy.

== Early life ==
Lien Pao-Tsai was born in 1953 in Changhua, Taiwan. She was initially named by her father as Pǎo-Tsǎi, with the second character of the given name being Tsǎi (彩) 'colorful'. However, the staff of the household registration administration mistakenly registered her name with the character Tsāi (猜) 'guess'. She did not feel confident about her name as a child. It wasn't until her college teacher told her that the Tsāi of her name implied that she was mysterious as people had to “guess” everything about her that Lien got over it.

Lien has two children and is married to Chen Qiu-Ji, who is also a potter himself. Chen Qiu-Ji has been an inspiration for Lien in her pottery career as well as her working partner, with whom he founded the learning institution of pottery.

As a child born in the countryside of Taiwan, Lien grew up playing with mud, resembling the way of hand-building in pottery and the materials that potters are made of. Her childhood hobby seemed to have cultivated her artistic talent and become one of the decisive factors that led her into the world of pottery. Even though she didn't receive artistic education as a young child, her fondness for arts and her desire to become an artist was already evident.

Lien graduated from the Department of Advertisement of Ming Chaun Junior College in 1973. She gained a wide range of access to arts during her college years, including pottery, oil painting, installation art, traditional Chinese painting, photography, etc. She has also cultivated her interest in photography. Her passion for taking photos of scenery was so strong that she upgraded her camera from film to single-lens reflex camera (SLR camera) and took it with her everywhere as a college student.

During Lien's college years, she became an apprentice of a famous carver and a professor, Yang Ying-Feng and Gu Xian-Liang, and learned the skills of carving and the theory of contemporary arts for 4 years. After graduation, she became an apprentice of two famous potters, Qiu Huan-Tang, known as the father of pottery in Taiwan and the pioneer of the technique of color glazing, as well as the potter Lin Bao-Jia, broadening her horizons in pottery and laying the foundation of her international exposure.

== Career ==
For more than 40 years, Lien has been devoted to different forms of ceramic art creations. She conveys her own experience, social observation, and care for life through pottery sculpture, painting, installation art, and other mixed-media creations. Also, most of her ceramic works are combined with mixed media, such as cast iron and oils, thus opening a contemporary landscape for her special personal ceramic creation.

In addition to early-life ceramics, she puts most of her effort into pottery sculptures. Her pottery sculptures mostly represent three-dimensional figures, animals, gods and Buddhas. Moreover, she also tries to create works on various themes, sometimes from her own realizations, sometimes from observing social phenomena and international affairs. For instance, one of her pieces focuses on the raging violence in Syria. The sculpture features an orphan, whose family members were all killed in the war. These artworks share stories and emotions that heal viewers's hearts and souls.

Inspired by her children, Lien begins to see the world with innocent eyes, interpreting the interrelationship between human beings and nature through the vibrant images of animals.

In the context of animals, she likes Chinese fables and Western histories, and she skillfully transforms characters in the story, such as frogs, clowns, tortoises, and rabbits from fables into her artworks, shattering the origin concept of those characters.

Subsequently, with her experiences of sickness and death and studying Buddhism, most of her artworks changed to a form of representing various aspects of life, illustrating the nature of life which are birth, old age, sickness, and death. Those experiences also make her go on the road of making one thousand Buddhas. Through her works in this period, she shows the imperfection and uncertainty in this bustling world, reminding people that love and peace are not easy to get and they need to expand their own vision to see this world.

Now that her children are older, she seems to have removed the invisible burdens, "I can now relieve and experiment with various colors as I wish." She describes herself as having gone through many vicissitudes and experiences, and now she can have a more clear and mature mind.

Lien has won international awards and her works have been collected by domestic and international organizations. The National Museum of History has selected more than 30 of her works for a special exhibition in 2018. In addition, she trains apprentices from Japan, Italy, Spain, the UK, the US, and more.“Some create with their hands and some their hearts,” says Sung, who has been invited to judge ceramic contests over the years. “Lien is one of the few who creates with both her hands and heart.”

Lien was the first person in Taiwan who stood out from more than 700 artworks and received the Asia Pacific Art Prize in 1999 for the work: God Bless You. In the same year, she also received the LifeLong Artist Accomplishment Award of the 20th Century on the same artworks, proving the international heights of artistic aesthetics and cultural practice of God Bless You. Moreover, in 2015, she won the second place in X Florence Biennale Art Design for her work: Beautiful Rebirth, The War between Roses, Noah’s Arc, and so on. She was delighted to receive the Florence Bienniale, which recognized her long creative career and inspired her to continue on the difficult path of creation.

== Signature style ==
Lien's signature theme has always revolved around current social affairs, the environment, and the everyday feelings of individuals, all showing her awareness of what has happened in society, around the world. One of her artworks from the Collection God Bless You: A Prosperous Country with People Living In Peace: Tracing the Path of History, has all the elements above. A sculpture of the Mother God-Mazu-Goddess of the Sea was pasted with many banknotes and placed in the middle of a seesaw with two guardians at each end and a large number of ceramic human footprints on the ground. This artwork was to show the current social affair of corruption with a subject of one the Gods in the Taiwanese, criticizing greed that happens nowadays in our society. The footprints on the ground symbolize the diligence of the Taiwanese early immigrants, and reminds them not to lose their ancestors for material belongings. This work won the first prize of the Fida Cup 20th Century Asia-Pacific Art Award in 2000, and Lien also won the 20th Century Outstanding Art Achievement Award.

A Prosperous Country with People Living in Peace: Tracing the Path of History - 1999

She also uses diverse perspectives on reflecting the society's situation. Recently there was a birth of a new family member in her family, her grandchild, and she portrayed her works from the perspective of children by using animals because it seems to reinterpret the human and nature connection, one of them for example: The Macaque Leads the Way - 2007, which features Taiwan best-known animal like the macaque, Formosan sika deer, an otter, a mountain goat and a hare having to move onto an ark after seeing their habitat being destroyed, which expresses her concerns about the environment.

The Macaque Leads the Way - 2007

Lien's artworks are also often inspired by Buddhism and a Buddhist Master, the late Master Sheng-Yen because it emphasizes the importance of love which inspires her to keep on working on the subject. When she was asked to create a statue of the deity, she had to do more research about the religious icon and Buddhism, to capture the feeling of Guanyin. She didn't convert to Buddhism after the research, but it did change her perspective on life, like the sense of joy and substance of life. By far, she has made more than 300 Guanyin Buddha statues to fulfill her vow that she made twenty years ago that she'll make a thousand statues.

Holding a Flower and Smiling - 2009

== Gallery ==
- Rebirth, 2006 - the three faces symbolize different stages of life while the butterflies represent rebirth.
- The Day after Tomorrow, 2007 - a cat and a mouse put aside their enmity to work together to save damaged earth.
- The Macaque Leads the Way, 2007 - expresses concern towards environment with representation of some of Taiwan's best-known animal.
- Holding a flower and Smiling, 2009
- Noah’s Arc, 2012 - concerns over global warming and rising sea levels.
- Prince Siddharta passed 5 gates (悉達多太子過五門), 2012
- Reasons for being spoiled (被寵爱的理由), 2012
- The comedian hit the earth (笑星撞地球), 2012
- One of the dreams come true (美夢成真之一), 2012
- The Beginning of Man (1) - Throne of Kings, 2017
- War Fire Floating Record, 2018
- Rafter wood seeking gold (椽木求金), 2012

== Exhibitions ==
Lien had her first solo exhibition in 1982 at the Spring Gallery. She has since had a few solo exhibitions and joint exhibitions to present her ceramic works not only in Taiwan but also in other countries from 1983 to 2018. To exhibit her artworks around the prestigious museums abroad, the Council of Cultural Affairs, now the Ministry of Culture, All-China Women's Federation, and Ministry of Foreign Affairs also sponsored her to show her artworks in Italy. In addition, she was invited to be a jury of the Taipei Fine Art Museum several times from 1983 to 1997.

=== List of selected exhibitions ===
- 2007: Post-Ceramics, Kuandu Museum of Fine Arts, Taichung, Taiwan
- 2012: Lien Poa-Tsai’s Spiritual Memoir, Taichung Cultural and Creative Industrial Park, Taichung, Taiwan
- 2013: Rules, Chang Liu 40th Anniversary Memorial Exhibition, Taipei, Taiwan
- 2015: The X Florence Biennale Art Design, Florence, Italy
- 2016:
  - Contemporary Ceramics and Sculpture Joint Exhibition, Chan Liu Art Museum, Taipei, Taiwan
  - New Aesop's Fables, Qujiang Futao International Ceramics Museum, Shaanxi, Qujiang
- 2018: Panoramic World, National Museum of History, Taipei, Taiwan

=== Permanent public installations ===
Lien first participated in "The Heart of Lukang" Public Art Exhibition with her work God Bless You in 1999 and then participated in the fifth ACROSS exhibition with the same work in 2021. This work is currently at No. 231, Lenei, Huwei Township, Yunlin County 632108, Taiwan.

== Collections ==
Lien's ceramic artwork, Refinement is in the collections of the National Taiwan Museum of Fine Arts. At the same time, her paintings, Promised Land and Plowing Hearts, are in Dharma Drum Mountain. Not only is her work collected in the Museums in Taiwan, but also collected by Académie des Beaux-Arts in Paris.

== Awards and honors ==
- 1999: the Asian Pacific Art Institute of America's 20th Century Award for Art Accomplishment
- 1999: LifeLong Artist Accomplishment Award of the 20th Century
- 2015: Florence Biennale Art Design Silver Award

== Footnote ==
Traditional Chinese uses the system of pinyin with 4 different tones applicable in each sound of a word. For example, for the sound “Tsai” in Lien Pao-Tsai's name, there would be four possibilities of intonation, which are Tsāi, Tsái, Tsǎi, and Tsài. And the four different tones are written in different ways and could carry different meanings. For further information, please refer to the article: https://www.thoughtco.com/four-tones-of-mandarin-2279480
