= J. Clinton Shepherd =

American artist

J. Clinton Shepherd (1888-1975) was an American magazine illustrator, sculptor and muralist.

== Biography ==
=== Early life ===
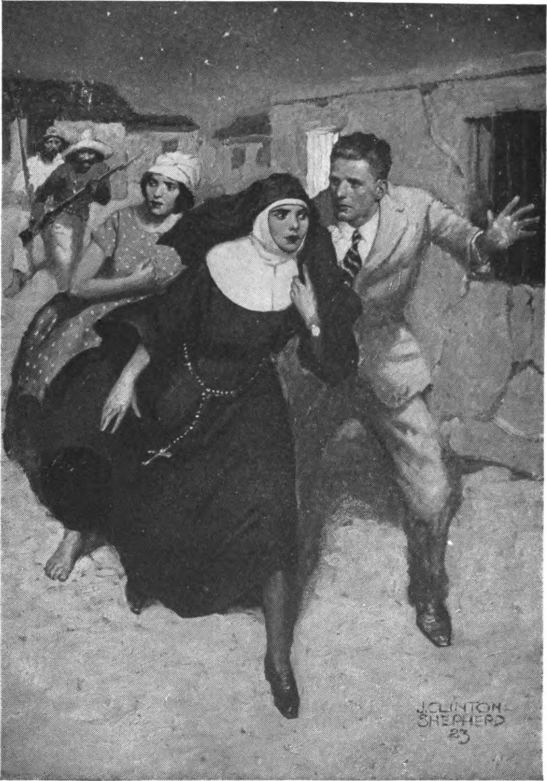
'I-I-how far do we have to run,' she gasped", an illustration for T. S. Stribling's Fombombo (1923).

Joy Clinton Shepherd was born on September 11, 1888. His father was Charles F. Shepherd and his mother, Emma Shepherd. He had four siblings. He attended the University of Missouri–Kansas City, but dropped out in 1906. With his brother, he moved to the Great Northwest and lived with Crow Indians. From 1910 to 1914, he studied at the Art Institute of Chicago. He joined the Illinois National Reserve as a bugler and served in the First World War.

=== Career ===
He moved to New York City in 1919. From 1921 to 1930, he worked as an illustrator for Collier's, The Saturday Evening Post, and Woman's World. He also did an illustration of Fombombo (1922), a novel by Thomas Sigismund Stribling (1881-1965) in Adventure.

In 1925, he moved to Westport, Connecticut and became a sculptor of bronzes in the manner of Frederic Remington. In the 1930s, he worked as an illustrator for Popular Publications.

In 1938, he moved to Palm Beach, Florida and started teaching art at Barry College in Miami Shores, Florida. He served as Director of the Norton Gallery School of Art in Palm Beach during the Second World War. By 1947, he opened his own art gallery in Palm Beach. He also painted murals at the Pebble Hill Plantation in Thomasville, Georgia, owned by Elisabeth Ireland Poe. He also did murals based on the Everglades at Clewiston Inn in Clewiston, Florida.

=== Personal life ===
He was married to Gail E. Shepherd. They had a daughter, Joy, and two sons, Edwin and Charles. He died of a heart attack on June 20, 1975 in Palm Beach, Florida.
