= The Clewiston News =

Newspaper serving Clewiston, Florida, US

- Type: Newspaper
- Founded: 1928
- Ceased publication: September 2018
- City: Clewiston, Florida
- OCLC number: 33429955

The Clewiston News was a newspaper serving Clewiston, Florida, US, and all of Hendry County and the surrounding area from 1928 to 2018. Historic issues of The Clewiston News are available in the Florida Digital Newspaper Library.

== Historic content ==
The early years of The Clewiston News contain critical primary source data on early Florida, Florida pioneers, Clewiston history, Harlem history, the Everglades, the Seminole Indians, and World War II aviation. The history of the Harlem Community before the 1960s is available through the Clewiston News. There is no written history of Harlem, which used to include an area owned by U.S. Sugar called Townsite.

The Clewiston News historic newspapers contain valuable information on the history of aviation, because John Paul Riddle, a pioneer in aviation training, airplane manufacturing, and airline operations, operated a flight school in Clewiston during World War II. (He also constructed and ran bases in Arcadia, Daytona Beach and in Obion County, Tennessee.) Riddle-McKay Aviation School of Florida, a private contractor for the United States government, built and operated bases, training approximately 26,000 pilots.

In September 2018, The Clewiston News was merged with the Okeechobee News, the Glades County Democrat, the Clewiston News and The Sun (covering Belle Glade, Pahokee, South Bay, and Canal Point) to create a new title called Lake Okeechobee News.

== See also ==
- Clewiston Museum
