= Executive House =

Historic house in Florida, United States

- U.S. National Register of Historic Places
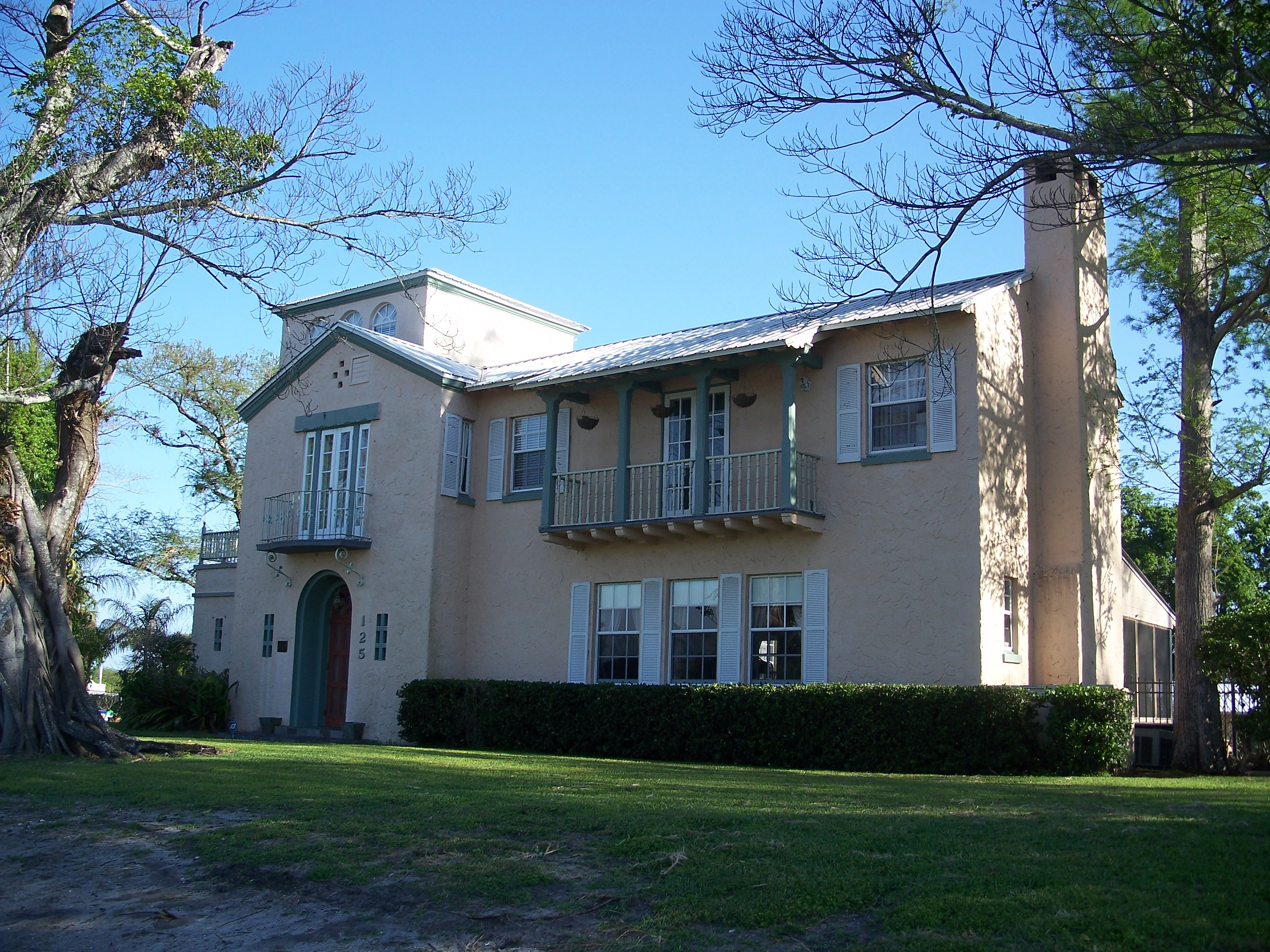

- Location within Florida
- Location: 125 W. Del Monte Ave., Clewiston, Florida
- Coordinates: 26°45′44″N 80°55′58″W
- Area: one and one half acres
- Built: 1929
- Architect: Clark J. Lawrence
- Architectural style: Mission/Spanish Revival
- NRHP reference No.: 98000059
- Added to NRHP: February 5, 1998

The Executive House is a historic house located at 125 West Del Monte Avenue in Clewiston, Florida. The house is locally significant as a well preserved example of the Mediterranean Revival style in Clewiston and as a representative work of Palm Beach architect Clark J. Lawrence.

== Description and history ==
It is a two-story, Mediterranean Revival style house with a three-story square tower with an irregular floor plan at one corner. The exterior walls have a stuccoed finish, resting on a concrete slab foundation, and are covered by cross-gable, hip, shed, and flat roof components. Tar and gravel is used for the flat roof; asphalt shingles cover the remaining roofed surfaces. The house is constructed of wood frame, covered with stucco.

It was added to the National Register of Historic Places on February 5, 1998.
