= Chow Leung =

Baptist missionary, author and educator

Chow Leung was a Chinese author, educator, and missionary in the United States. He was the co-author of Chinese Fables and Folk Stories, which he wrote with Mary Hayes Davis. Born in China, he was a Baptist missionary in Chicago's Chinatown, where he started a Chinese language school for children in 1900, likely the first in the city. Chinese Fables and Folk Stories claimed to be "the first book of Chinese stories ever printed in English". Compiled and published prior to the rise of vernacular Chinese, the book was later called one of the most "reliable" works by Western scholars on Chinese folktales before 1937.

== Early life and education ==
Chow Leung received a Confucian education in China. His grandfather was said to have been a "high-ranking Confucian" and “one of the emperor’s favorites.” He converted to Christianity in San Francisco at a “street meeting”, and joined the American Baptist Home Mission Society. He was ordained as a Baptist minister. (Note: In 1898, a man named Chow Leung was ordained as pastor of the Baptist Church in Canton, China, but there is no indication that they were the same person. (Wright, May Emily (1902). The Missionary Work of the Southern Baptist Convention. Philadelphia: American Baptist Publication Society. p. 74.))

== Pastor in Chicago ==
In 1900, Reverend Chow Leung was sent to Chicago to take over as pastor of the Central Baptist Chinese Mission. He succeeded Reverend Lee Tsai Leung. William Pickett was the superintendent. The mission was located in the "old" Chinatown, on South Clark Street in the Chicago Loop.

When Wu Tingfang, the Chinese ambassador to the United States, visited Chicago in 1901, he made a point of visiting Chinatown. One of the stops on his visit was the Baptist Chinese Mission, hosted by Reverend Chow Leung.

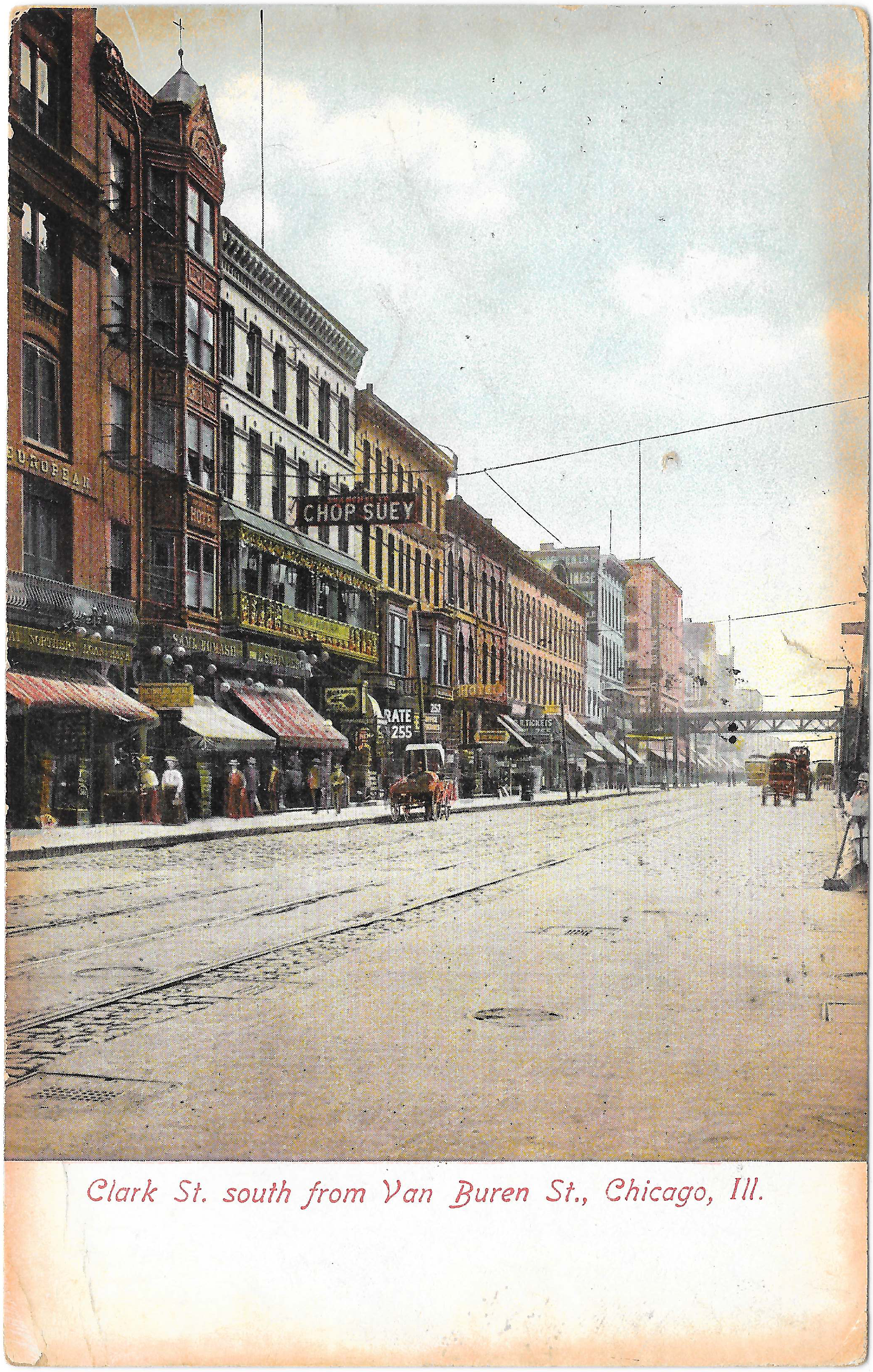
South Clark Street, Chicago (1908)

=== Open-air preaching ===
With assistance from the Young Men's band from Moody Church and the Christian Endeavorers of Chicago, the Central Baptist Chinese Mission held regular open-air musical performances from the rooftop of its one-story building. Known as the "rooftop garden act", the music drew crowds who stopped to listen. Chow Leung himself played a baby organ. Between sets, Reverend Chow Leung and others would preach on the street in Chinese and English. In the evening, the band went indoors, drawing the crowds inside the mission for meetings. On at least one occasion, participants were arrested for blocking the streets.

In the summer of 1904, Chow Leung was involved in a highly publicized "battle of noise" between the Christian evangelists and the "joss house" or temple in Chinatown. Frustrated with the music and noise coming from the Christian mission, the joss-house priest played a kettle drum from the temple balcony, which was answered by gongs, drums, and rattles from either side of South Clark Street. According to The Inter Ocean, Chow Leung smiled and stated that he fully expected his opponents to be even louder the following Sunday.

=== Public speaking ===
In September 1904, Chow Leung reported on progress at the Chinese mission at the Chicago Baptist Association conference. In April 1907, Chow Leung addressed the largest gathering of native Chinese to have been assembled in Chicago, as the only ordained Chinese minister in the city. The interdenominational congregation gathered at Assembly Hall, where the Presbyterian minister Andrew Beattie, a former missionary in China, gave a sermon in Cantonese. He was visiting to raise donations for victims of the 1906 San Francisco earthquake. At that point, the Chinese population in Chicago had grown to approximately 4,000, in part due to the earthquake in San Francisco.

== Chinese language school ==
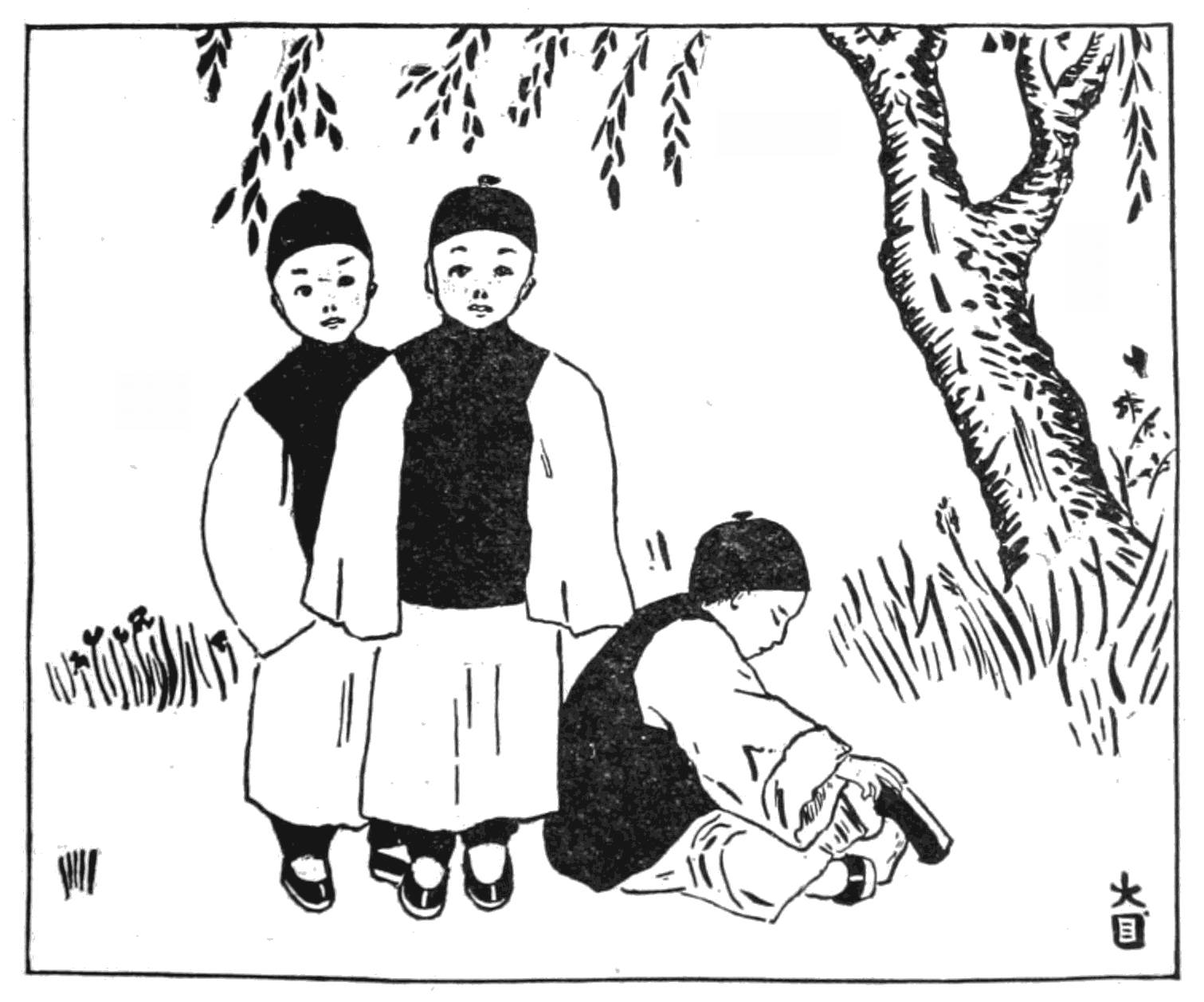
Illustration from "Three Girls Who Went to a Boys' School" from Chinese Fables and Folk Stories

In 1900, Chow Leung founded a Chinese language school for children in Chicago. It was a departure from the Sunday schools offered by the Christian missions in Chicago, which had focused on providing English-language instruction to Chinese adults since 1878. Under Reverend Chow Leung, the Baptist Chinese Mission offered Chinese language classes on weekdays from four o'clock in the afternoon, and in the evenings. Pupils also attended "regular" public school during the day, where they received instruction in English. The Chinese school operated year-round, with no vacations. Tuition was free, but pupils were expected to attend regularly.

In 1904, Chow Leung taught 21 children, nearly all of whom were Chinese. Boys and girls were taught together. A feature article in The Inter Ocean described one of his classes:

Chinese books are used exclusively and the Chinese language is spoken. Seventeen little tots surround the teacher, Rev. Chow Leung, grasping at his coat tails, asking him questions, acting in a manner that speaks plainer than words of his popularity among the children.

A typical lesson was taught in two parts. In the first part, the children traced pictures and characters that told a story, using brush calligraphy. In the second part, they were taught orally, individually and in small groups. The school taught reading, writing, and arithmetic. Pupils were introduced to stories relating to Chinese history, as well as Christian thought "in a kindly way". Although the school had initially been regarded with suspicion, its popularity grew by word of mouth.

Community support for Chinese language instruction gained momentum in the years that followed. In 1905, a community leader petitioned Minister Wu Tingfang to allocate funds toward a Chinese Education Commission in Chicago. By 1906, several more Chinese language schools had been established by the Chinese Association and the Chinese YMCA.

== Chinese Fables and Folk Stories ==
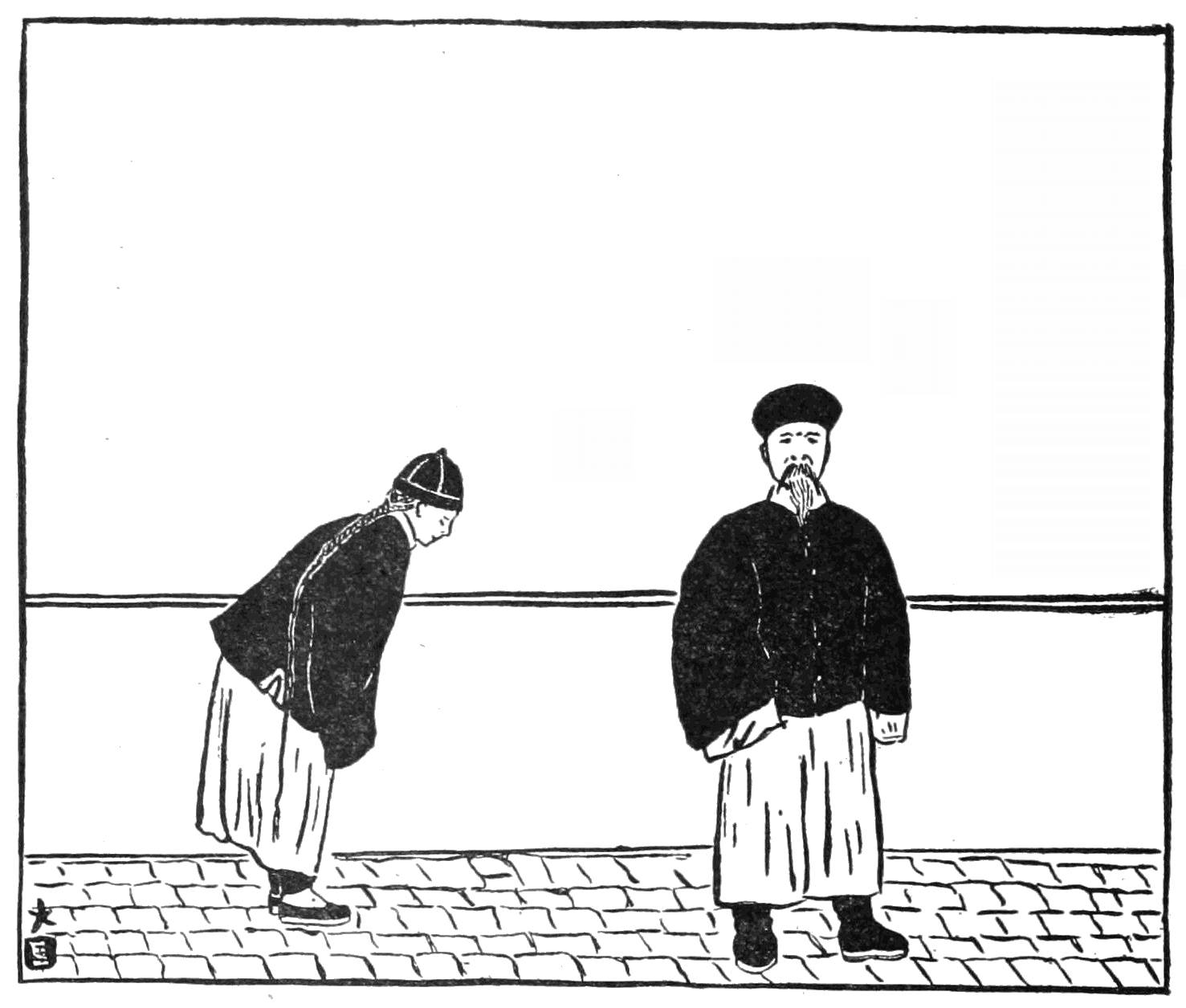
"The Boy of Perfect Disposition" from Chinese Fables and Folk Stories

Mary Hayes Davis was writing for a major daily newspaper in Chicago when she "stumbled" onto the idea of writing Chinese Fables and Folk Tales with Chow Leung. In the preface of the book, Davis called him "an invaluable collaborator" with "an evident desire to serve his native land and have the lives of his people reflected truly." She thanked him for his "patient courtesy" and wrote that "he has given much time to explaining obscure points and answering questions innumerable." While developing the book, Chow Leung managed to get most of his points across in pidgin English, although at times they relied on an interpreter.

First published in 1908, Chinese Fables and Folk Stories was well received by American educators and by major newspapers nationwide. By 1911, it was used extensively as a supplemental reader in Chicago public schools. By 1922, it was said that the book was used in schools throughout the United States, China, and Japan. The book continues to be widely reprinted today.

== See also ==
- Chinese Fables and Folk Stories
- History of Chinese Americans in Chicago
- Chinatown, Chicago
