= Clewiston Inn =

Historic site in Florida, United States

- U.S. National Register of Historic Places
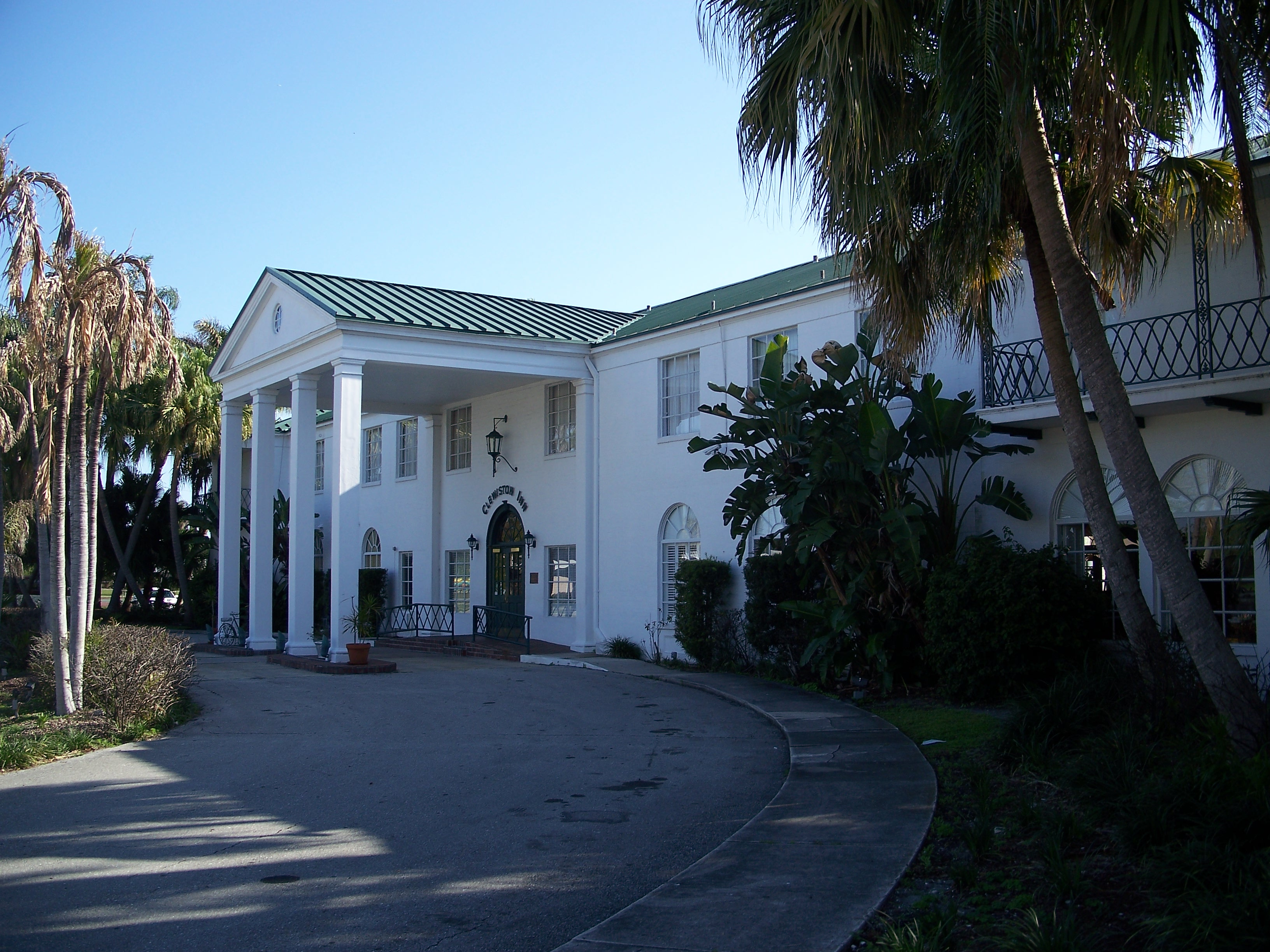

- Location within Florida Location within the United States
- Location: Clewiston, Florida, United States
- Coordinates: 26°45′16.2″N 80°56′0.6″W
- Area: 2 acres (0.81 ha)
- Built: 1926
- Architect: L. Phillips Clarke of West Palm Beach, Edgar S. Wortman
- Architectural style: Classical Revival
- NRHP reference No.: 91000106
- Added to NRHP: February 21, 1991

The Clewiston Inn (also known as The Inn) is a historic site in Clewiston, Florida, United States. It is located at U.S. 27, west of the junction with CR 832, and is the oldest hotel in the area of Lake Okeechobee. On February 21, 1991, it was added to the U.S. National Register of Historic Places.

== History ==
The Clewiston Inn was originally built along the unprotected waterfront of Lake Okeechobee in 1926 by the Clewiston Company, the community and real estate development arm of Bror Dahlberg's Southern Sugar Company. Ownership passed to the United States Sugar Corporation in 1931 when Charles Stewart Mott formed the company and acquired the assets of the Southern Sugar Company, which went into bankruptcy in 1929. The building survived the great 1926 and 1928 hurricanes but was destroyed by a fire in 1937 and the classical revival style structure was rebuilt in 1938. The Everglades Lounge and Bar inside has a 360-degree wildlife mural featuring the flora and fauna of the Florida Everglades. It was created in the early 1940s by the J. Clinton Shepherd (1888-1975). This Palm Beach artist stayed at the Inn for many months, making frequent trips to the Everglades to sketch the animals.

In 2007 the U.S. Sugar Corporation sold the Inn to Big Lake Hotels.

In 2011 the Big Lake Hotels Corporation sold the Inn to Clewiston Hospitality LLC.

== Gallery ==
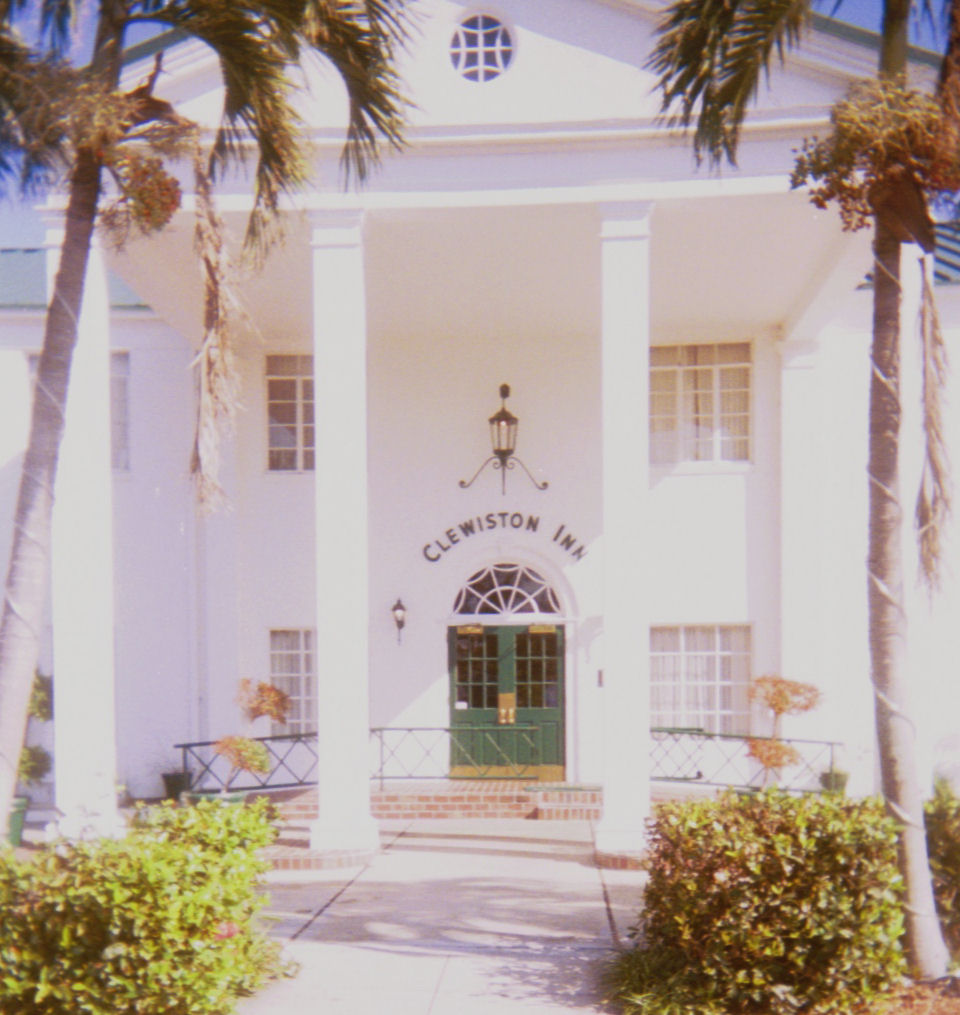

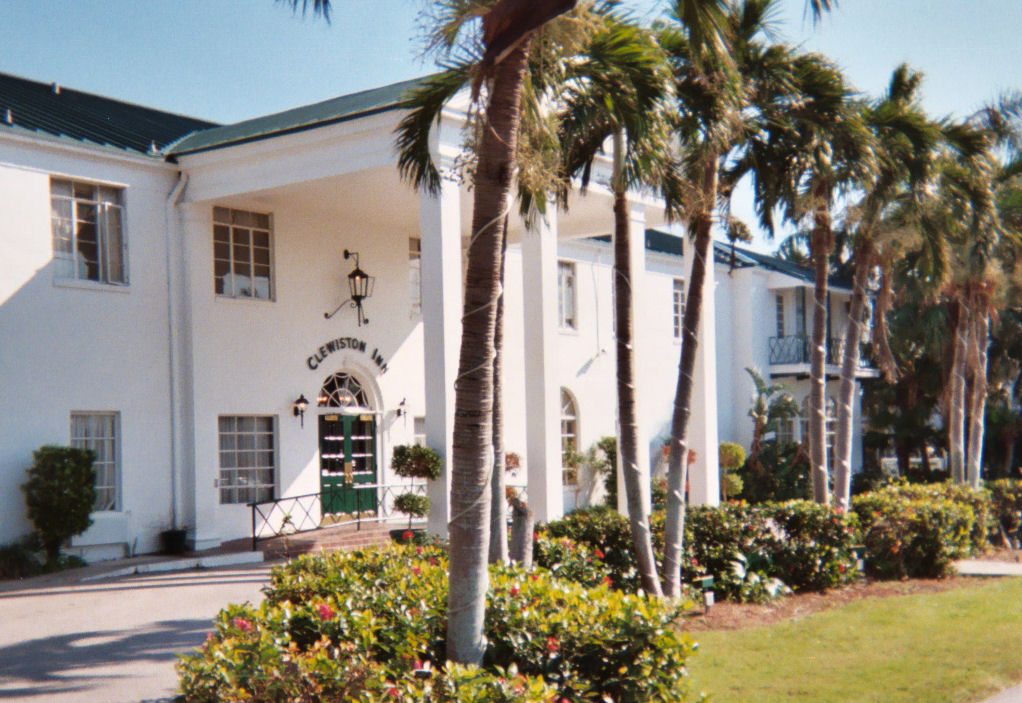

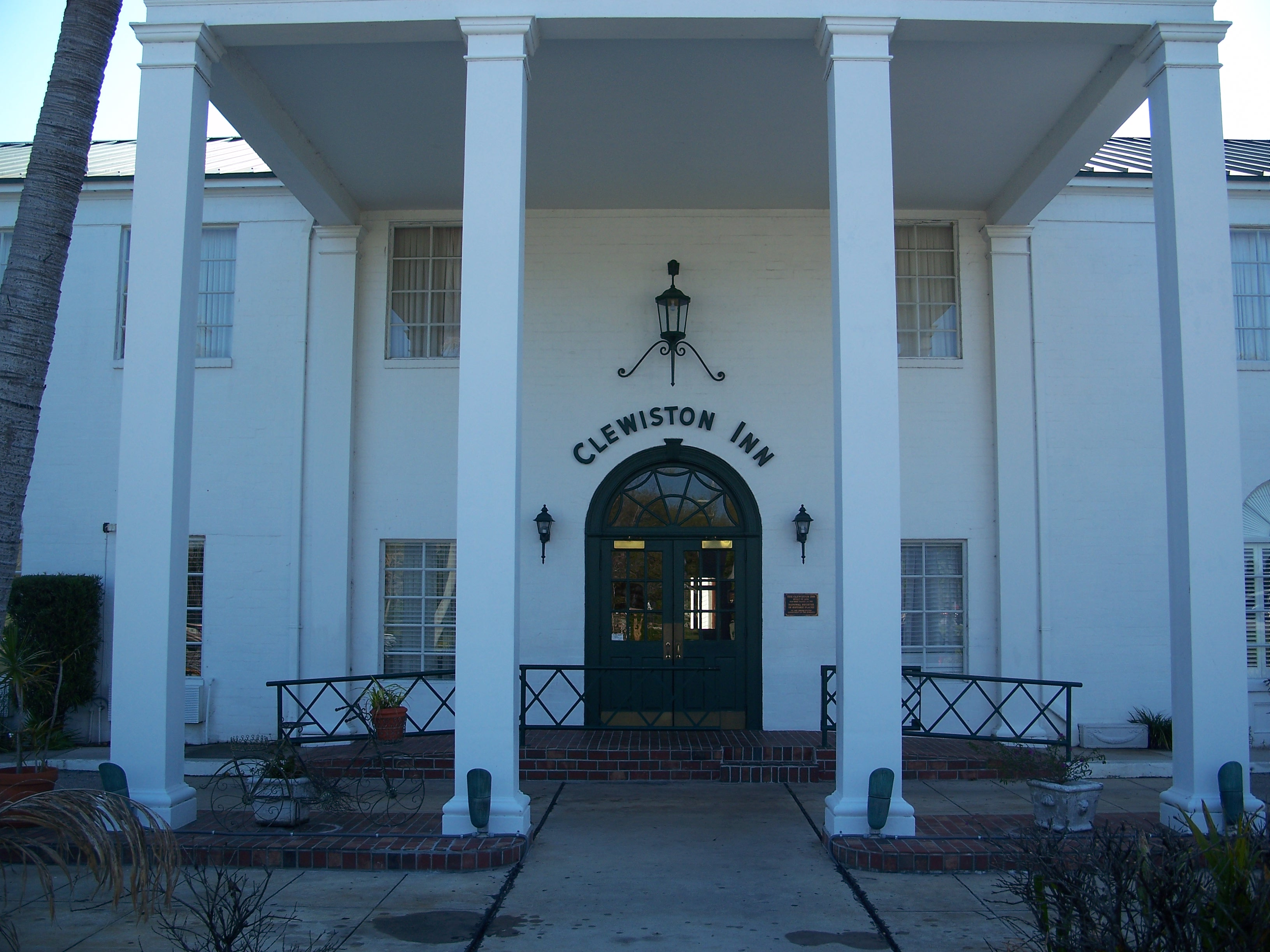

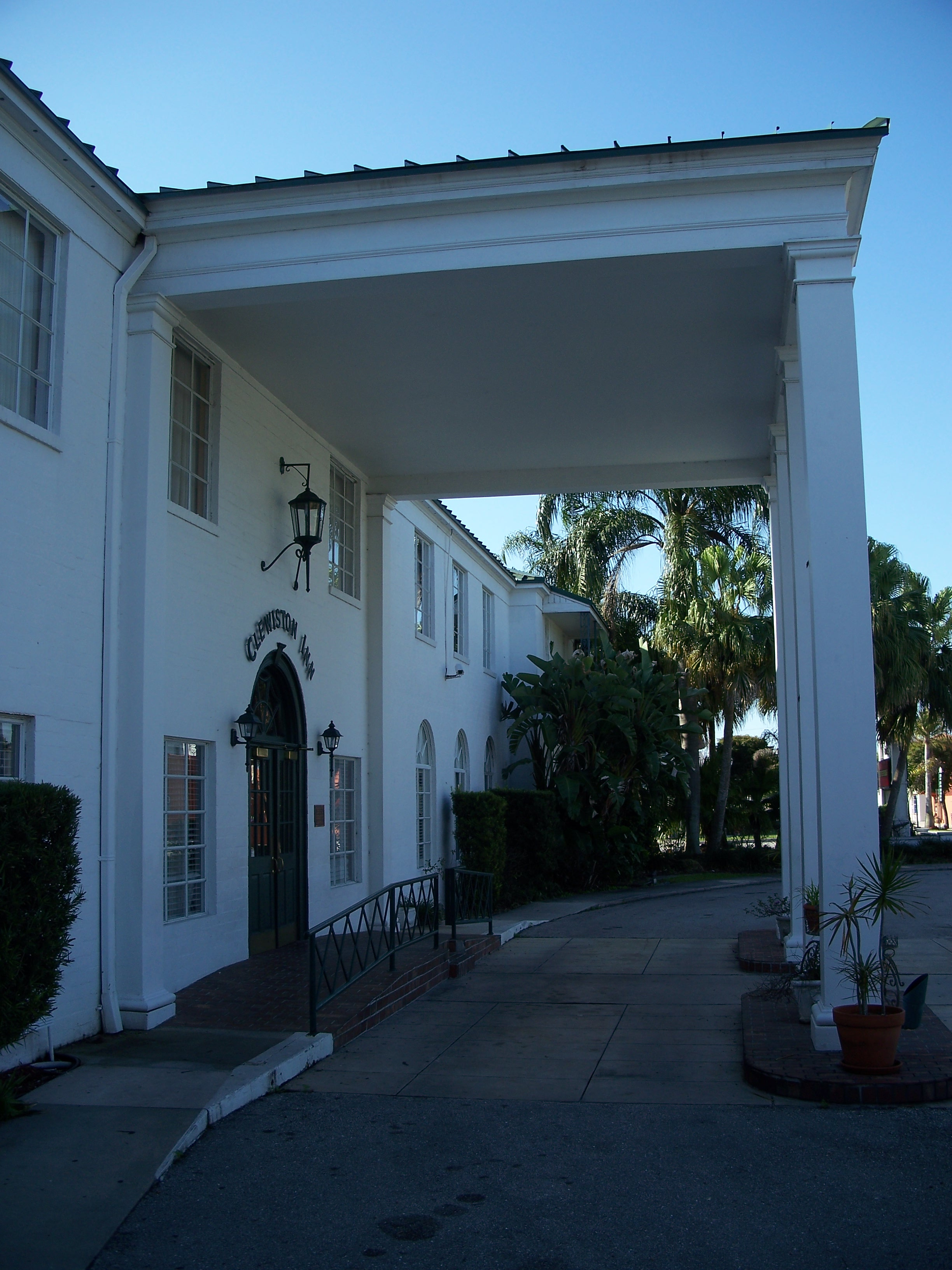

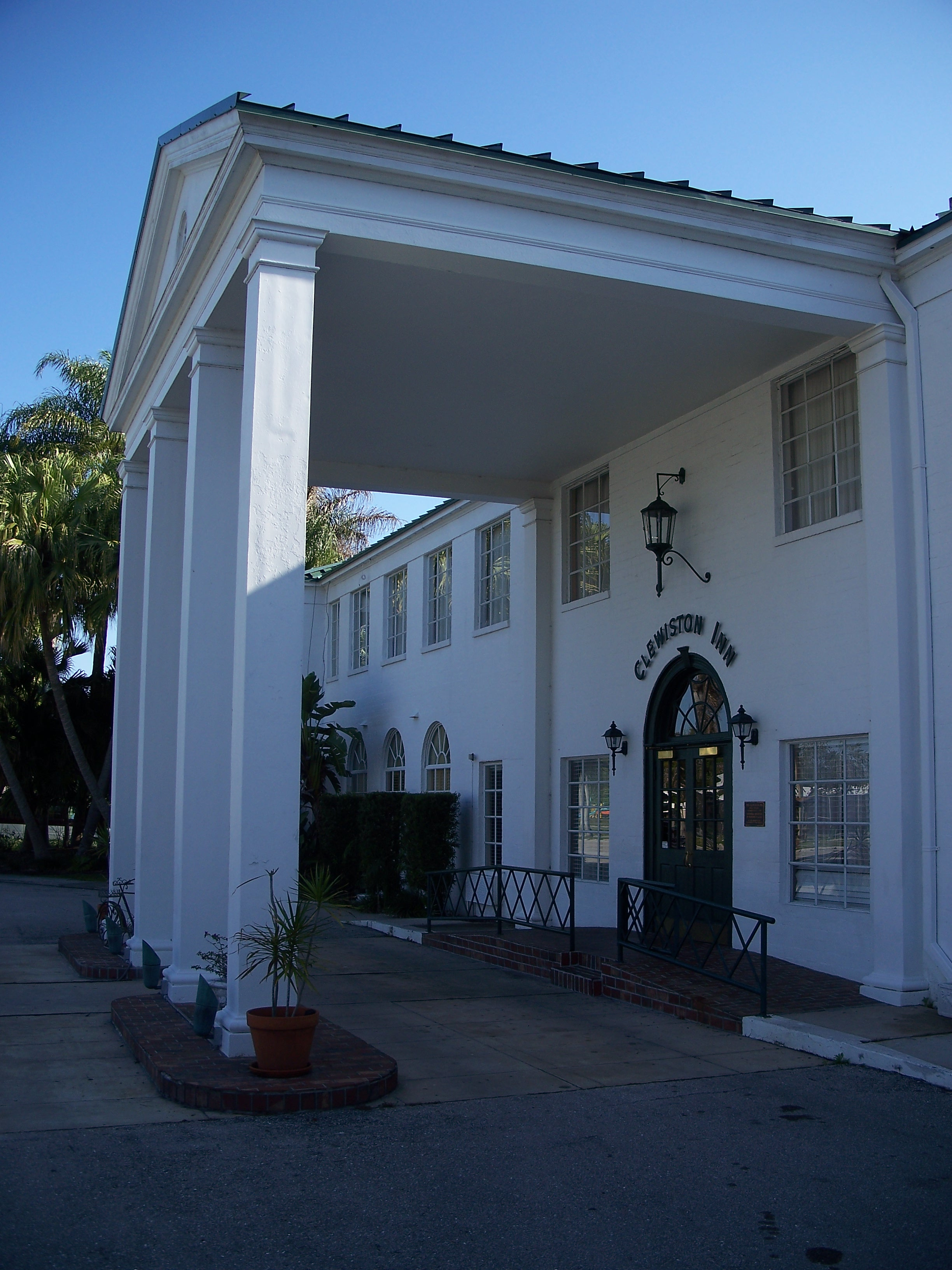

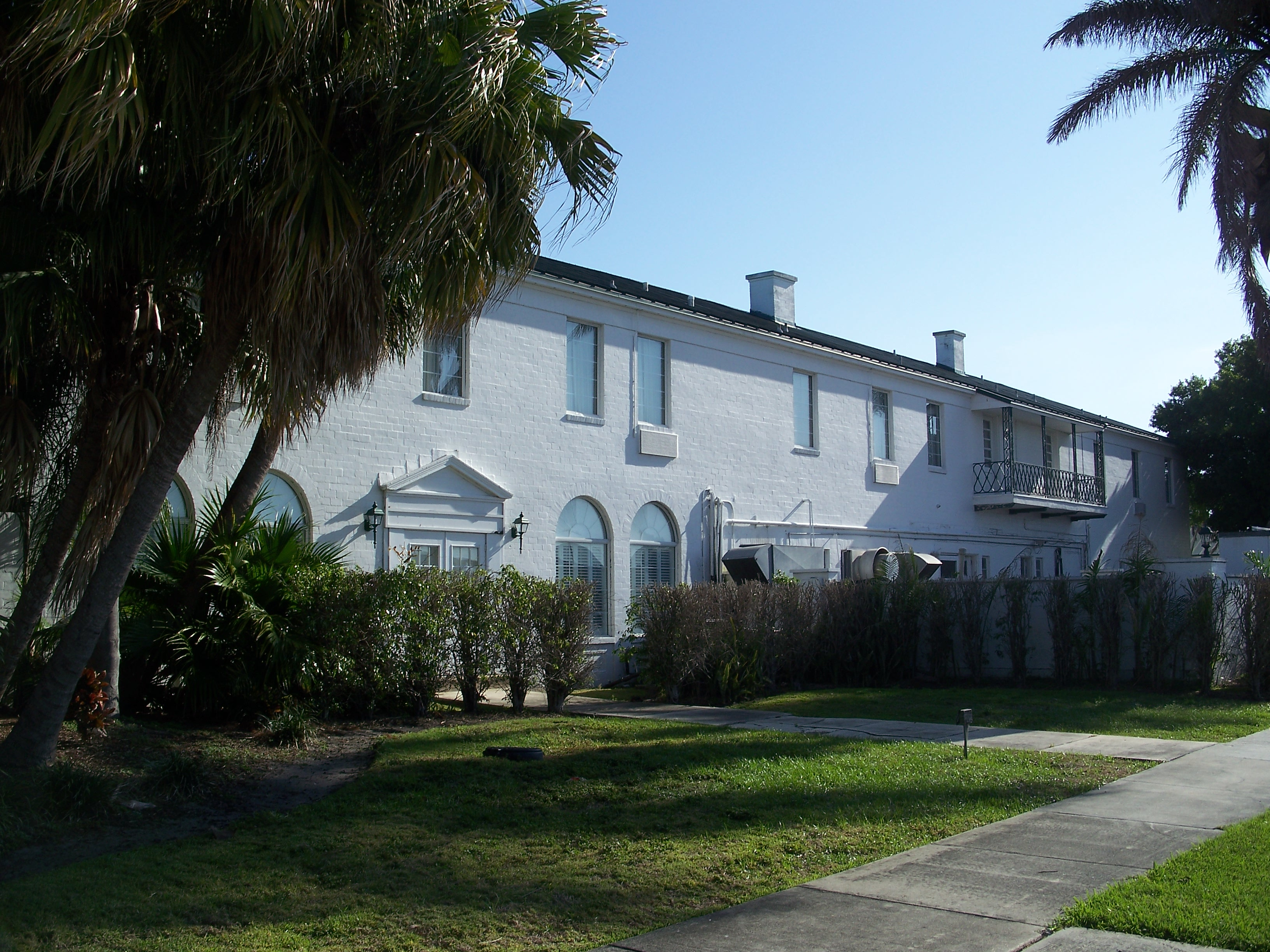
