= Dixie Crystal Theatre =

- U.S. National Register of Historic Places
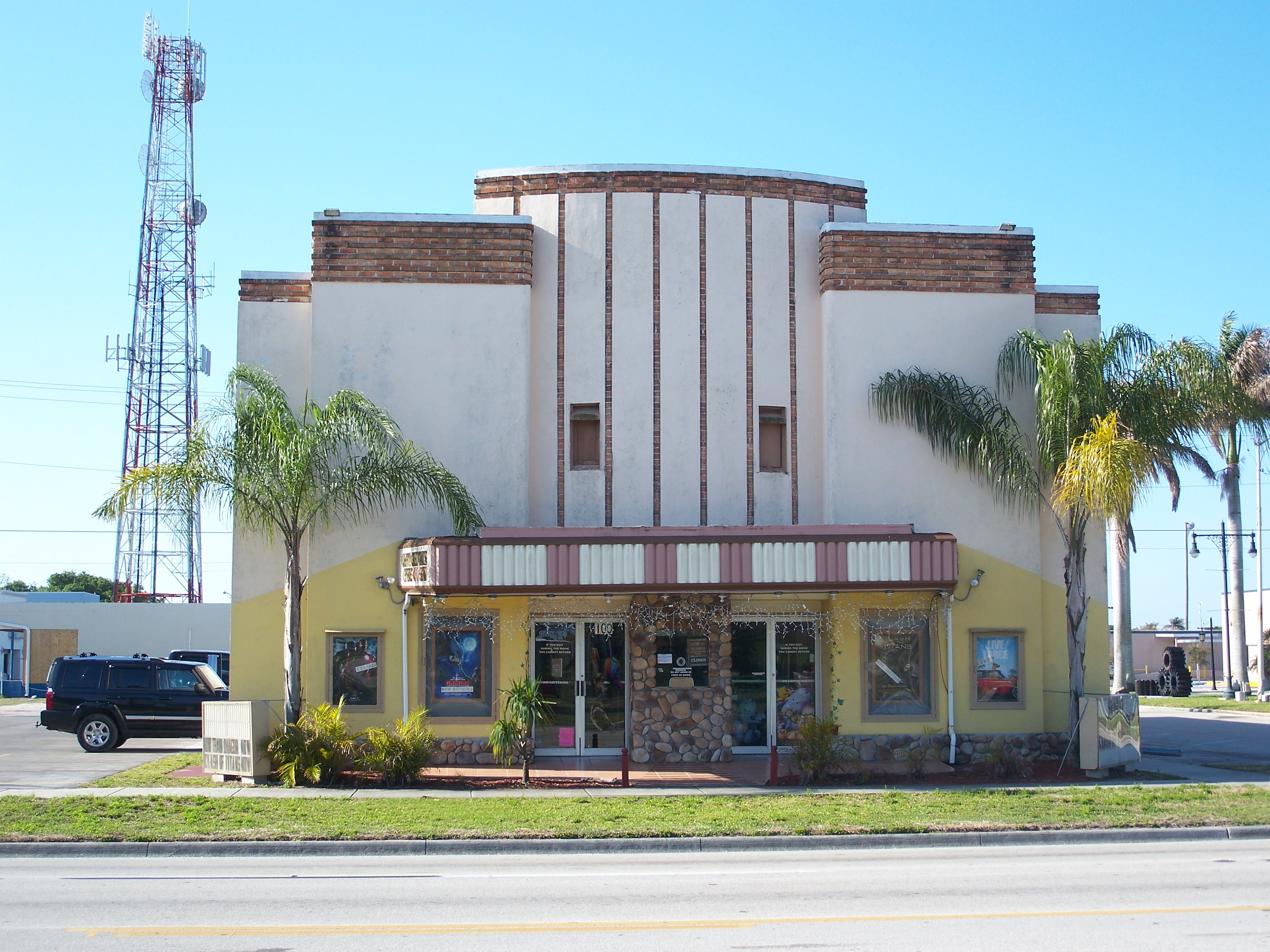

- Location within Florida Location within the United States
- Location: 100 E. Sugarland Hwy., Clewiston, Florida
- Coordinates: 26°45′14″N 80°56′04″W
- Area: less than one acre
- Built: 1941
- Built by: Anderson, Earl Anderson Contracting Co.
- Architect: C.A. Cone
- Architectural style: Moderne
- NRHP reference No.: 98001202
- Added to NRHP: September 25, 1998

The Dixie Crystal Theatre (also known as the Clewiston Theater) is a historic site in Clewiston, Hendry County, Florida. It is located at 100 East Sugarland Highway. It first opened in 1941. In 1998, it was added to the U.S. National Register of Historic Places.

It is a flat-roofed one-story masonry movie theater, built in a simplified Moderne style – one of the few buildings in the area to feature this type of architecture. In 1940, the building was commissioned by Mary Hayes Davis, a newspaper publisher and businesswoman who operated a chain of movie theaters in south Florida and the Lake Okeechobee region. It was her second theater in Clewiston with that name. Davis had opened the first Dixie Crystal Theatre at the corner of Sugarland Highway and Central Avenue in 1934. The theaters got their name from the local sugar industry product.

The architect of the new Dixie Crystal Theatre was Chester A. Cone of West Palm Beach and Palm Beach, who also designed the Prince Theatre in Pahokee. The builder and contractor was Earl Anderson. It is 45 by 93 feet (14 m × 28 m) in plan.

The Clewiston Theater was integrated peacefully on July 20, 1964, when five African American youths attended an evening show there for the first time. A Hendry County sheriff's deputy and a Clewiston policeman were present for the duration of the film.

The theater closed briefly in 2011, but soon reopened, featuring live bands, first-run movies, and independent films. By early 2015, the Clewiston Theater had closed. As of 2023, the theatre has been converted into a dentist office.

== See also ==
- Clewiston Museum
