= Chinese Fables and Folk Stories =

American compilation of Chinese folklore (1908)

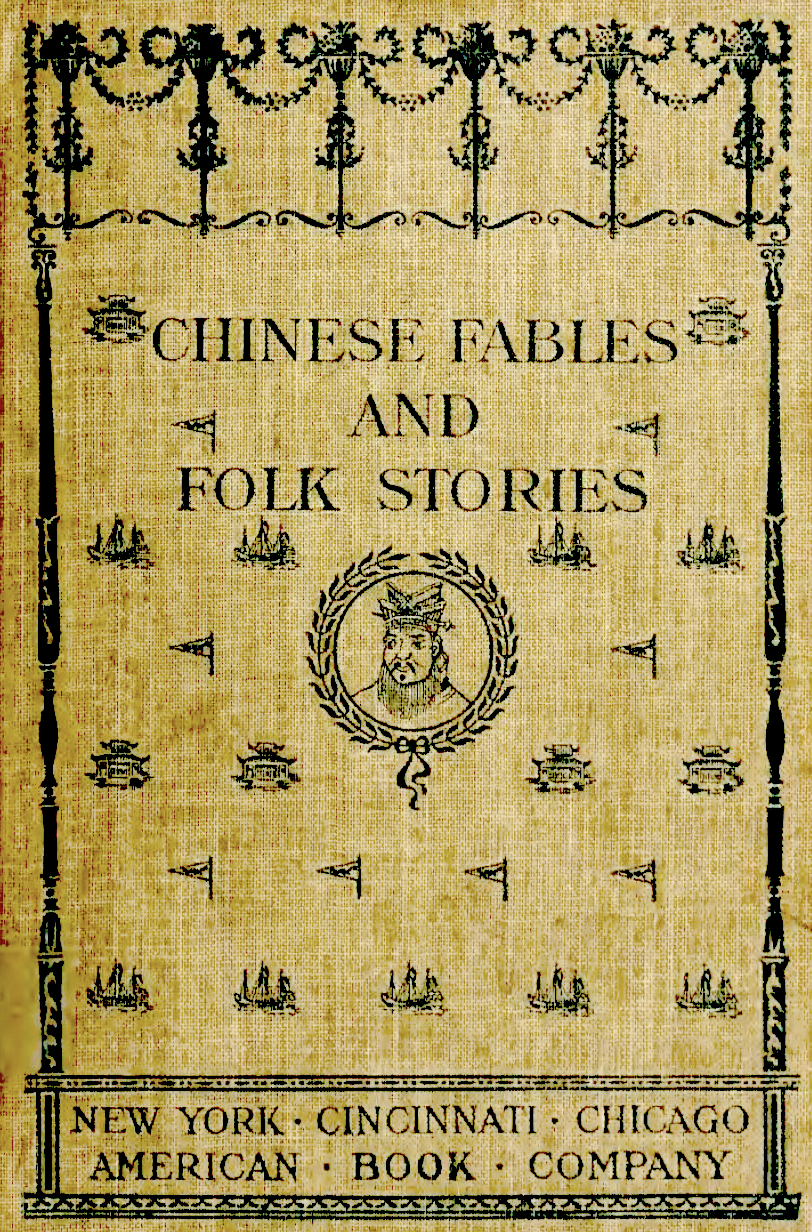
- Author: Mary Hayes Davis; Chow Leung
- Language: English
- Genre: Folklore; Children's literature
- Published: 1908
- Publisher: American Book Company
- Publication place: United States

Chinese Fables and Folk Stories, a compilation of 37 tales, was billed as the first book of Chinese fables ever printed in English when it was published by American Book Company in 1908. The co-authors were Mary Hayes Davis and Chow-Leung. Widely reprinted today and also translated into French, Chinese Fables and Folk Stories has been noted as one of the most "reliable" works by Western scholars on Chinese folktales published before 1937. Each tale in the book is accompanied by an illustration, attributed to unnamed "native" Chinese artists.

== Historical context ==
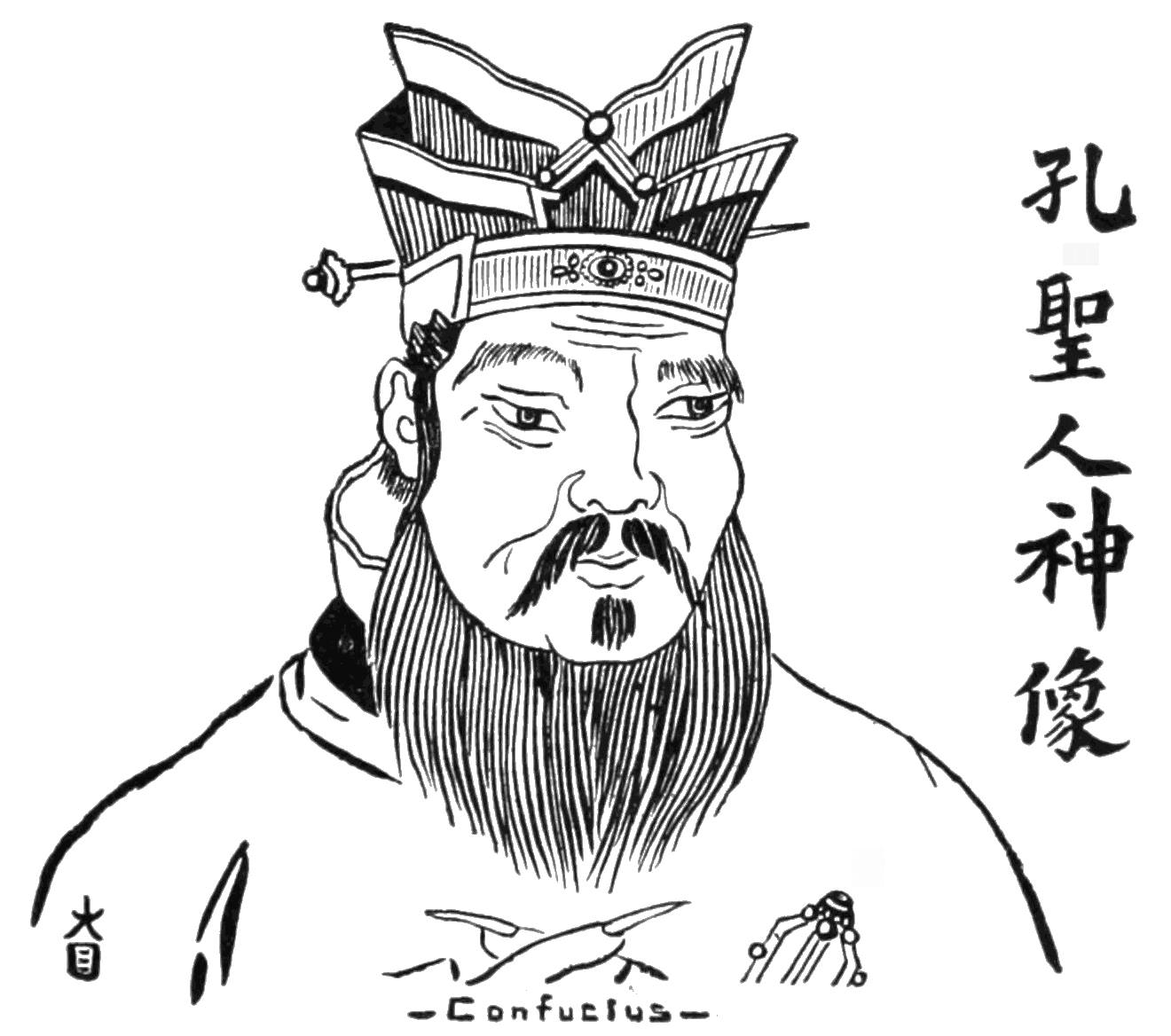
"A Lesson from Confucius" in Chinese Fables and Folk Stories

Published in 1908, Chinese Fables and Folk Stories predated the rise of vernacular Chinese and the New Culture Movement in China. Until the 1920s, the very idea that oral narratives should be recorded and studied for their own sake had been unthinkable, due to the dominance of classical Chinese as the standard written language used by the highly educated literati.

The book includes an introduction by Wang Tsen-Zan (also known as Yin-Chwang Wang Tsen-Zan) of the University of Chicago. Writing in 1908, Wang explained that Chinese fables had not been translated into English or other European languages until then for several reasons. First, the fables themselves were scattered across classical literary and historical texts, read only by the educated elite in China. Second, the classical Chinese or "book language" had historically been inaccessible to foreigners, even if they were able to speak the language and read newspapers. Wang positioned Chinese Fables and Folk Stories as providing "a bird's-eye view of the Chinese thought in this form of literature."

Writing in 1975, folklore scholar Nai-tung Ting explained that European folklorists "roaming" China in the 19th century had largely been preoccupied with recording Chinese superstitions and customs. In ''Chinese Folk Narrative: A Bibliographical Guide'', Ting wrote, "The few collections of narratives which came out then and during the first two decades of our century all appear to have confused folk literature with obvious imitations of folk literature and popular literature." However, he argued that Chinese Fables and Folk Stories by Mary Hayes Davis and Chow Leung was an exception, and listed it as one of the "most reliable" contributions by Western scholars before 1937. He determined this on the basis that a fairly large number of the tales compiled by Davis and Chow Leung corresponded with tales which were later collected by modern Chinese oral folklorists.

== Development ==
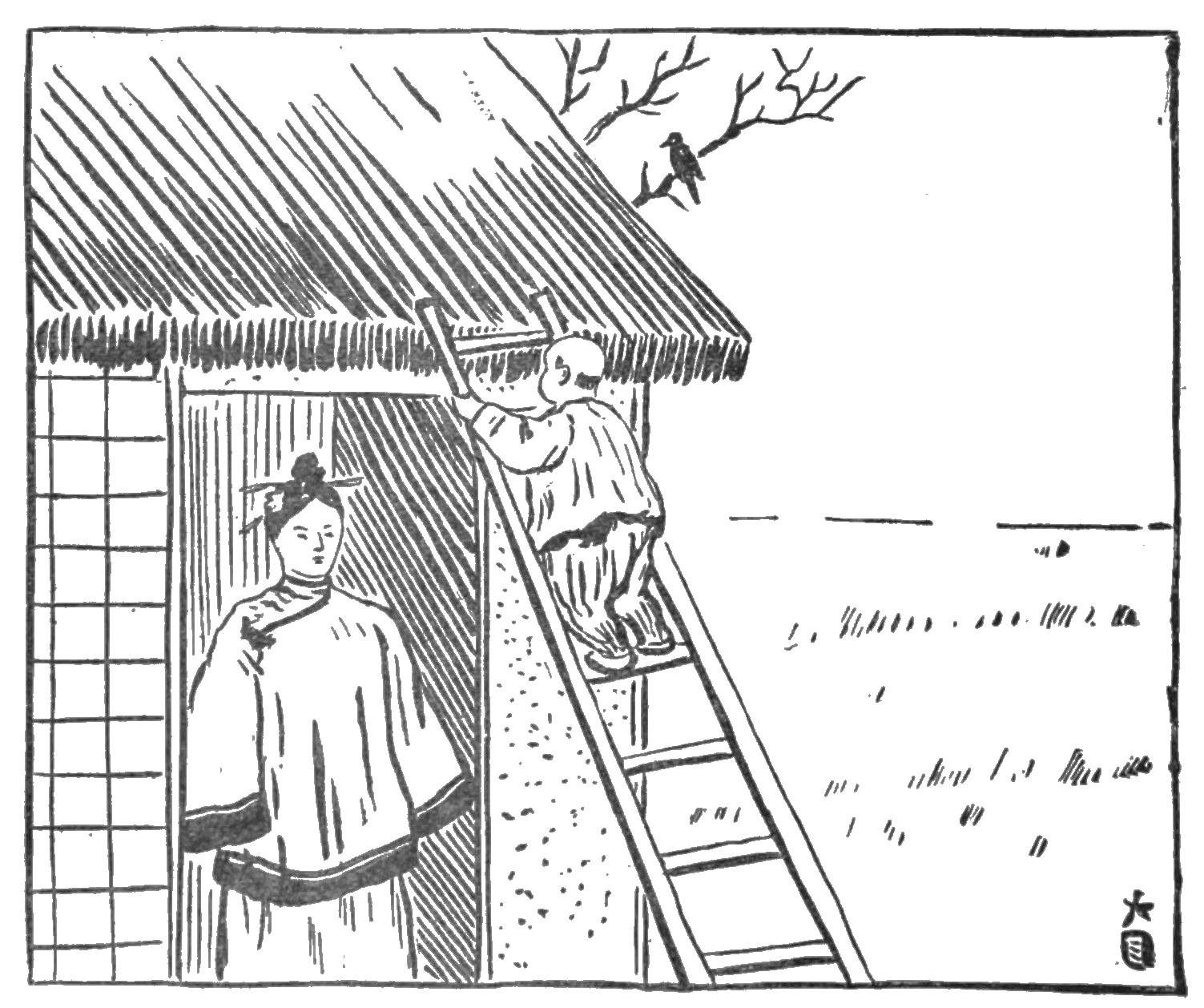
"The Boy Who Wanted the Impossible" in Chinese Fables and Folk Stories

Mary Hayes Davis was working as a journalist for a major Chicago newspaper when she met Reverend Chow-Leung of the Central Baptist Chinese Mission. Chow Leung also taught a Chinese language school for children, which he founded soon after arriving in Chicago in 1900. Intrigued by her "discovery" that Chinese fables did in fact exist – despite statements by scholars to the contrary – Davis set out to record the stories in English. Chow Leung narrated the stories to her in English, mostly without an interpreter. Davis had apparently also learned some Chinese. She dedicated the book to her friend Mary F. Nixon-Roulet, who wrote a book called Japanese Folk Stories and Fairy Tales, also published by American Book Company in 1908.

== Critical reception ==
When it was first published, Chinese Fables and Folk Stories was mentioned by The Sun newspaper in New York as a "curious" book with "novelty", while The Journal of Education described it as a "delightful little reader" that illuminated "the peculiarities of the Oriental mind". Both The Journal of Education and The Elementary School Teacher praised the co-authors for their efforts, with the former commenting that "The interest of the book is greatly increased by the fact that in addition to a Saxon compiler it has also a Chinese compiler." The Elementary School Teacher recommended the book for "children of the later years of the elementary school", and stated:

To one who is not a student of oriental thought the book gives glimpses of a different life, a conception of the ideas of life and a mode of embodying these ideals in forms so alien to our own and yet in ways so human that it carries with this sense of difference the indescribable feeling of charm. While affording a series of pictures of manners, customs, and ideas not our own, it still draws a remote people nearer to the one who enters into these sympathetic human records.

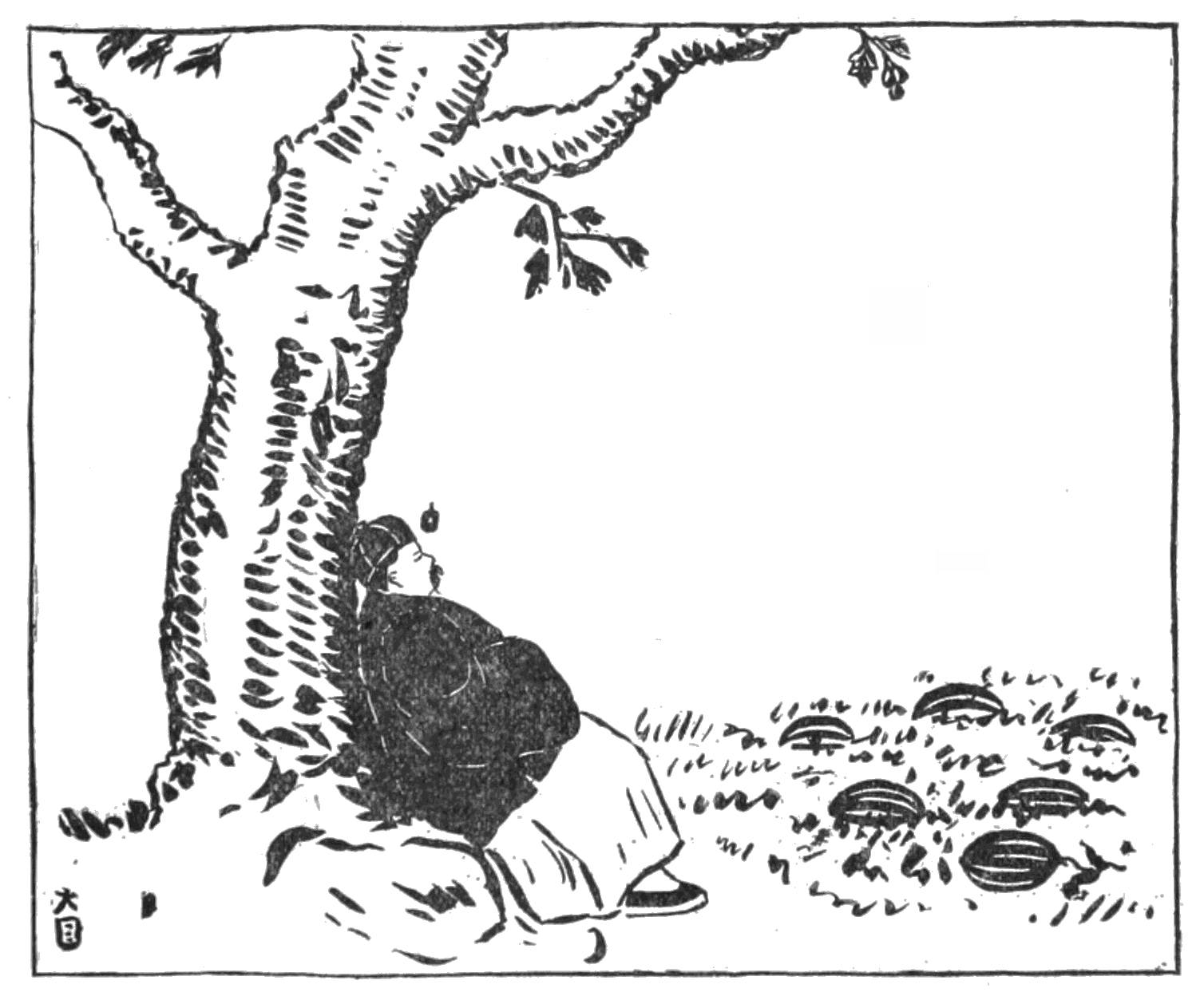
"The Melon and the Professor" in Chinese Fables and Folk Stories

In the journal Folklore, British folklorist A. R. Wright criticized the authors for not providing information on the original literary sources for the Chinese fables. Wright wrote that the collection "seems for the most part to represent the ''Goody Two-Shoes'' rather than the ''Mother Goose'' of Chinese literature." He suggested that some of the stories appeared to be retellings of Western tales. According to Wright, "The Body that Deserted the Stomach" was a retelling of the "tale of the belly and the members told to the mutinous citizens in ''Coriolanus''". Both The Sun and Folklore observed that "The Melon and the Professor", a tale involving a melon and a fig tree, also sounded familiar, with The Sun remarking that the story "shows that Chinese and Westerners may think alike."

The Sun questioned the educational value of printing Chinese characters within the book without transliteration, and suggested that the illustrations, while "appropriate", "seem to have been modified by an Oriental artist for Western tastes."

On November 8, 1908, the Chicago Record-Herald declared: "Mrs. Davis's discovery is from a literary point of view one of the most important ever made in the study of the Chinese or any other tongue, it is the authoritative proof of a literary expression heretofore denied to a people by the student world."

== Popularity ==
- By 1911, Chinese Fables and Folk Stories was being taught as a supplemental reader in Chicago public schools.
- In 1913, "A Great Repentance and a Great Forgiveness" from Chinese Fables and Folk Stories was re-published in The Golden Key Book: A School Reader.
- In 1917, Religious Training in the School and Home by E. Hershey Sneath, George Hodges, and Henry Hallam Tweedy recommended "The Proud Chicken" from Chinese Fables and Folk Stories for teaching the virtues of community life.
- In 1922, the anthology Latchkey of my Bookhouse, edited by Olive Beaupré Miller, re-published the story “The Boy Who Wanted the Impossible”.
- "A Lesson from Confucius" appeared in World Tales for Creative Dramatics and Storytelling (1962).
- The book has been translated into French as Fables et histoires populaire chinoises by Nicolae Sfetcu.

== See also ==
- Chinese folklore
- Chow Leung
- Mary Hayes Davis
