= Clewiston, Florida =

- City
- City of Clewiston
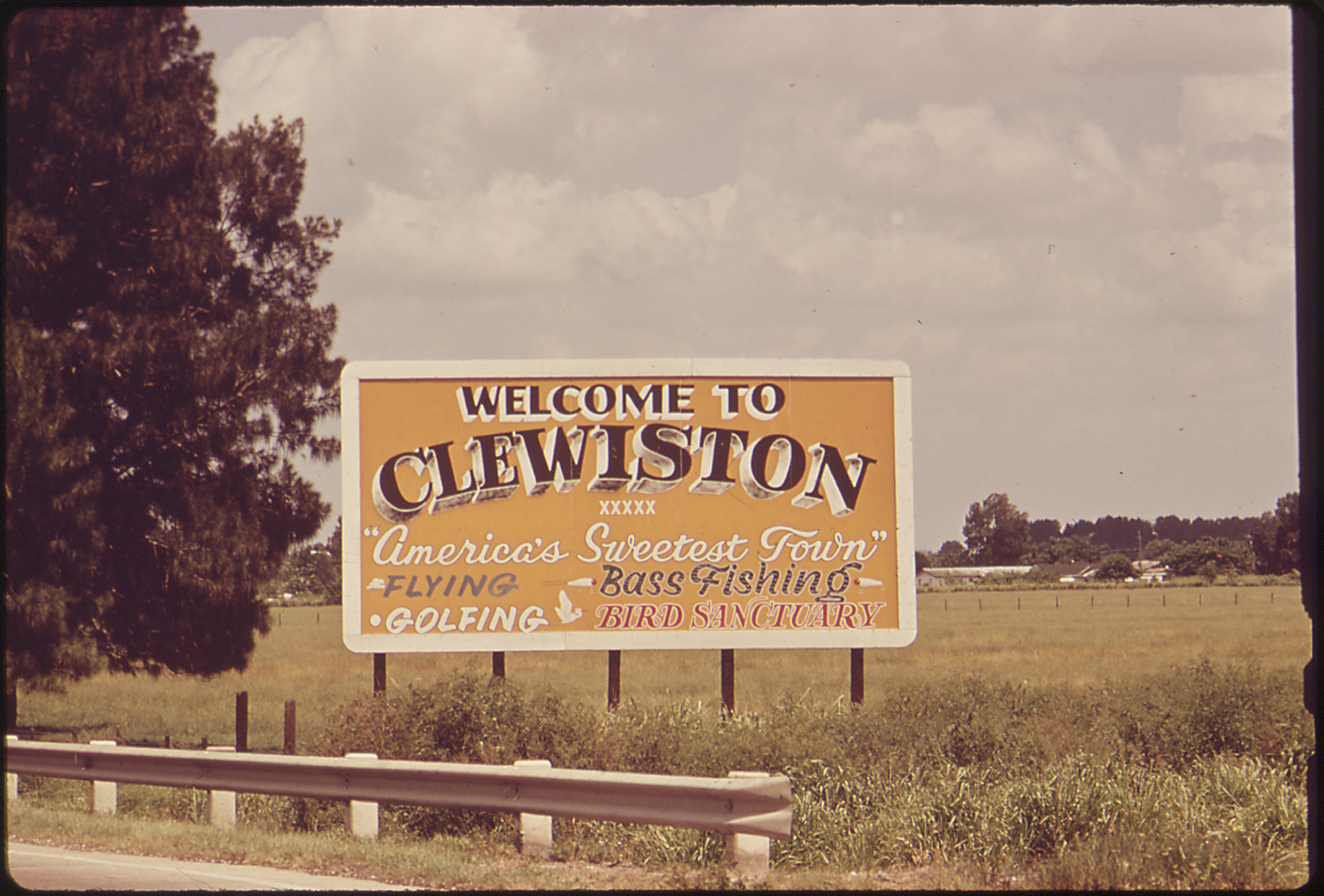
- Welcome to Clewiston road sign

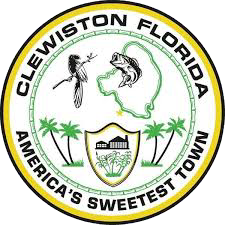
- Seal
- Motto: America's Sweetest Town
- Location in Hendry County and the state of Florida
- Coordinates: 26°44′54″N 80°56′22″W
- Country: United States
- State: Florida
- County: Hendry
- Settled: 1920
- Incorporated: 1925

Government
  - Type: Commission-Manager

Area
  - Total: 4.51 sq mi (11.68 km^{2})
  - Land: 4.50 sq mi (11.66 km^{2})
  - Water: 0.012 sq mi (0.03 km^{2})
- Elevation: 16 ft (4.9 m)

Population (2020)
  - Total: 7,327
  - Density: 1,627.9/sq mi (628.54/km^{2})
- Time zone: UTC-5 (Eastern (EST))
  - Summer (DST): UTC-4 (EDT)
- ZIP code: 33440
- Area code: 863
- FIPS code: 12-13000
- GNIS feature ID: 2404073
- Website: www.clewiston-fl.gov

Clewiston is a city in Hendry County, Florida, United States. Its location is 80 miles (130 km) northwest of Fort Lauderdale on the Atlantic coastal plain. The population was 7,327 at the 2020 census, up from 7,155 at the 2010 census. It is the principal city in the Clewiston micropolitan area.

The city is located on the south bank of Lake Okeechobee, and the Lake Okeechobee Scenic Trail (LOST) passes through the edge of the city. It is home to the Clewiston Museum and the Dixie Crystal Theatre. The area has been home to Seminole tribe members and sugar plantations, with the Ah-Tah-Thi-Ki Seminole Indian Museum located 32 miles (51 km) south of the city.

== History ==
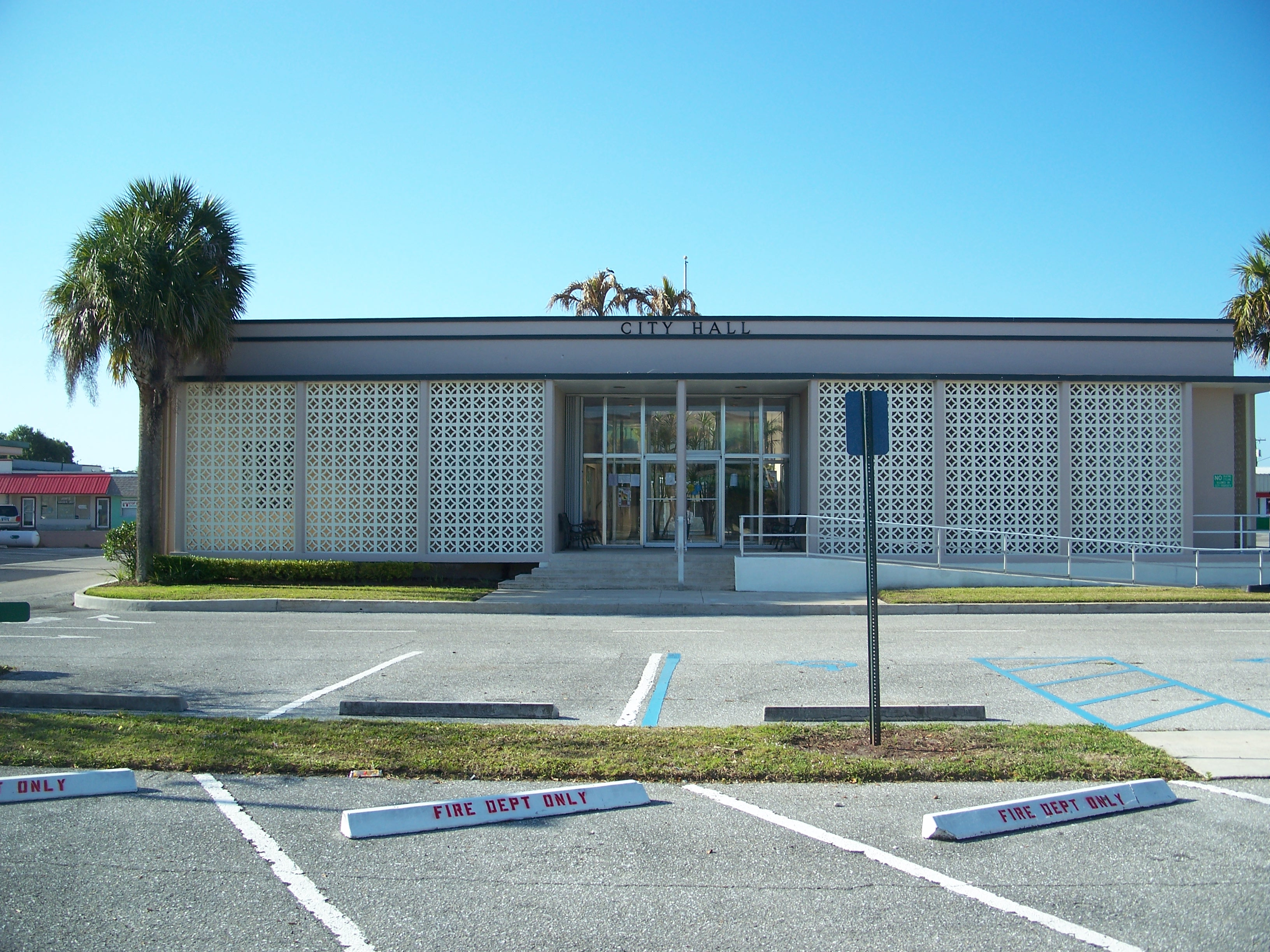
Clewiston City Hall

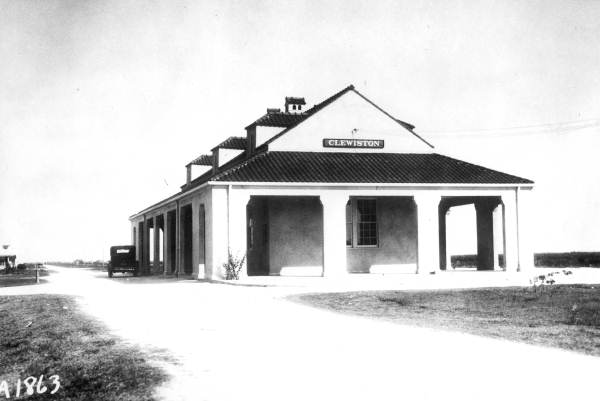
Former Clewiston railroad depot

The area beside Lake Okeechobee was once used as a fishing camp by the Seminole tribe. The first permanent settlement began in 1920, when John O'Brien of Philadelphia and Alonzo Clewis (1864-1944) of Tampa purchased a large tract of land to establish a town. They commissioned a town plan and built the Moore Haven & Clewiston Railway to connect the community to the Atlantic Coast Line Railroad at Moore Haven. Incorporated as a city in 1925, Clewiston would become noted for its sport fishing, particularly of largemouth bass.

Large sugarcane farms were established around Lake Okeechobee. By the 1950s and 1960s, the cultivation of citrus, vegetables and cattle were also important to the economy. The US Sugar Corporation, however, remained the dominant manufacturer in Clewiston, which became known as "America's Sweetest Town". On June 24, 2008, Governor Charlie Crist announced that the state of Florida had arranged to buy for $1.75 billion the company's 187,000 acres (76,000 ha), including the refinery in Clewiston.

On November 11, the plan was scaled back to $1.34 billion for 181,000 acres (73,000 ha) of farmland, no longer including the mill, citrus processing facilities and other assets. This would allow the company to remain in business and leave open the possibility of preserving its 1,700 jobs. Over the next seven crop cycles, the farmland would be leased back from the state to US Sugar for $60 million. It would then be converted into reservoirs and water-filtering areas as part of the ongoing restoration of the Everglades ecosystem.

== Geography ==
Clewiston is located in the northeast corner of Hendry County on the southwestern shore of Lake Okeechobee. It is part of the Florida Heartland region. To the south it borders the CDP of Harlem.

U.S. Route 27 passes through the center of Clewiston, leading west then north 15 miles (24 km) to Moore Haven, and southeast 16 miles (26 km) to South Bay. Florida State Road 80 runs with US 27 through Clewiston but leads west 31 miles (50 km) to LaBelle, the Hendry County seat.

The local streets of Clewiston are laid out in a typical grid pattern to the south of US 27/hidden SR 25/SR 80, while streets such as Circle Drive, Crescent Drive and Arcadia Avenue loop around to the north, only to return to US 27 and SRs 25 and 80 in the opposite order. For example, Olympia Street becomes Circle Drive north of US 27, then loops around to come back to San Pedro Drive. Corona Street becomes Arcade Avenue north of US 27, then loops around to come back to San Benito Street. Crescent Drive runs parallel to Circle Drive and Arcade Avenue in the same loop, but only north of Osceola Avenue.

According to the U.S. Census Bureau, Clewiston has a total area of 4.7 square miles (12.2 km^{2}), of which 0.027 square miles (0.07 km^{2}), or 0.54%, are water.

=== Climate ===
Clewiston has a humid subtropical climate (Köppen: Cfa).

Climate data for Clewiston, Florida, 1991–2020 normals, extremes 2002–2016
Month	Jan	Feb	Mar	Apr	May	Jun	Jul	Aug	Sep	Oct	Nov	Dec	Year
Record high °F (°C)	89 (32)	92 (33)	96 (36)	99 (37)	99 (37)	102 (39)	100 (38)	100 (38)	99 (37)	97 (36)	93 (34)	90 (32)	102 (39)
Mean daily maximum °F (°C)	73.6 (23.1)	77.4 (25.2)	80.2 (26.8)	84.6 (29.2)	88.4 (31.3)	90.4 (32.4)	91.8 (33.2)	91.6 (33.1)	90.0 (32.2)	86.8 (30.4)	81.4 (27.4)	75.8 (24.3)	84.3 (29.1)
Daily mean °F (°C)	62.3 (16.8)	65.8 (18.8)	68.4 (20.2)	73.2 (22.9)	77.9 (25.5)	81.1 (27.3)	82.7 (28.2)	82.8 (28.2)	81.4 (27.4)	77.2 (25.1)	70.3 (21.3)	64.7 (18.2)	74.0 (23.3)
Mean daily minimum °F (°C)	51.0 (10.6)	54.2 (12.3)	56.6 (13.7)	61.8 (16.6)	67.4 (19.7)	71.9 (22.2)	73.5 (23.1)	73.9 (23.3)	72.9 (22.7)	67.6 (19.8)	59.2 (15.1)	53.7 (12.1)	63.6 (17.6)
Record low °F (°C)	24 (−4)	28 (−2)	33 (1)	42 (6)	52 (11)	64 (18)	67 (19)	69 (21)	63 (17)	42 (6)	36 (2)	28 (−2)	24 (−4)
Average precipitation inches (mm)	2.06 (52)	1.77 (45)	2.27 (58)	2.38 (60)	4.29 (109)	7.21 (183)	7.27 (185)	7.88 (200)	6.20 (157)	2.10 (53)	1.05 (27)	1.74 (44)	46.22 (1,173)
Average precipitation days (≥ 0.01 in)	3.3	4.0	4.5	4.6	6.5	12.9	14.0	15.1	12.7	5.2	3.9	4.4	91.1
Source 1: NOAA
Source 2: XMACIS2

== Demographics ==
Historical population
Census	Pop.	Note	%±
1940	1,338		—
1950	2,499		86.8%
1960	3,114		24.6%
1970	3,896		25.1%
1980	5,219		34.0%
1990	6,085		16.6%
2000	6,460		6.2%
2010	7,155		10.8%
2020	7,327		2.4%
U.S. Decennial Census

=== Racial and ethnic composition ===
Clewiston racial composition (Hispanics excluded from racial categories) (NH = Non-Hispanic)
Race	Pop 2010	Pop 2020	% 2010	% 2020
White (NH)	2,517	2,259	35.18%	30.83%
Black or African American (NH)	873	970	12.20%	13.24%
Native American or Alaska Native (NH)	51	20	0.71%	0.27%
Asian (NH)	160	210	2.24%	2.87%
Pacific Islander or Native Hawaiian (NH)	2	1	0.03%	0.01%
Some other race (NH)	16	24	0.22%	0.33%
Two or more races/Multiracial (NH)	50	104	0.70%	1.42%
Hispanic or Latino (any race)	3,486	3,739	48.72%	51.03%
Total	7,155	7,327	100.00%	100.00%

=== 2020 census ===
As of the 2020 census, Clewiston had a population of 7,327. The median age was 36.4 years. 26.6% of residents were under the age of 18 and 14.9% of residents were 65 years of age or older. For every 100 females there were 96.4 males, and for every 100 females age 18 and over there were 94.5 males age 18 and over.

98.2% of residents lived in urban areas, while 1.8% lived in rural areas.

There were 2,487 households in Clewiston, of which 42.0% had children under the age of 18 living in them. Of all households, 45.7% were married-couple households, 19.7% were households with a male householder and no spouse or partner present, and 27.1% were households with a female householder and no spouse or partner present. About 20.5% of all households were made up of individuals and 7.8% had someone living alone who was 65 years of age or older.

There were 2,760 housing units, of which 9.9% were vacant. The homeowner vacancy rate was 2.1% and the rental vacancy rate was 6.4%.

=== Demographic estimates ===
According to the 2020 ACS 5-year estimate, there were 1,921 families residing in the city.

=== 2010 census ===
As of the 2010 United States census, there were 7,155 people, 2,269 households, and 1,643 families residing in the city.

=== 2000 census ===
As of the census of 2000, there were 6,460 people, 2,174 households, and 1,632 families residing in the city. The population density was 1,381.0 inhabitants per square mile (533.2/km^{2}). There were 2,434 housing units at an average density of 520.3 per square mile (200.9/km^{2}). The racial makeup of the city was 75.79% White, 10.93% African American, 0.39% Native American, 1.18% Asian, 9.64% from other races, and 2.07% from two or more races. Hispanic or Latino of any race were 40.94% of the population.

In 2000, there were 2,174 households, out of which 39.5% had children under the age of 18 living with them, 55.9% were married couples living together, 12.5% had a female householder with no husband present, and 24.9% were non-families. 18.9% of all households were made up of individuals, and 7.2% had someone living alone who was 65 years of age or older. The average household size was 2.93 and the average family size was 3.32.

In 2000, in the city, the population was spread out, with 29.7% under the age of 18, 10.3% from 18 to 24, 28.3% from 25 to 44, 20.8% from 45 to 64, and 10.9% who were 65 years of age or older. The median age was 32 years. For every 100 females, there were 103.9 males. For every 100 females age 18 and over, there were 104.4 males.

In 2000, the median income for a household in the city was $37,143, and the median income for a family was $38,652. Males had a median income of $31,139 versus $21,049 for females. The per capita income for the city was $15,527. About 14.8% of families and 18.8% of the population were below the poverty line, including 25.9% of those under age 18 and 7.1% of those age 65 or over.

== Education ==
The following are public schools located in the area, operated by Hendry County Schools:

- Eastside Elementary
- Westside Elementary
- Central Elementary
- Clewiston Middle School
- Clewiston High School

Private schools:

- Clewiston Christian School
- Harvest Academy Christian School

Native American School:

- There is a tribal school affiliated with the Bureau of Indian Education, Ahfachkee School, that has a Clewiston postal address but is outside the city limits, on the Big Cypress Reservation.

=== Libraries ===
The Hendry County Library Cooperative in Florida includes the Clewiston Library, Barron Library (located in LaBelle, the county seat) and the Harlem Library.

All three libraries provide Hendry County residents with materials and general information, and each library has a secondary individualized area of focus. The Clewiston Library has a Florida room to house historical reference material and books pertinent to local and state history. The Harlem Community Library is located in a former school building which also houses the Harlem Academy daycare center and its specialty is a growing African American collection. The Barron Library collects genealogical materials.

The Clewiston Library also recently sought and received an LSTA grant to digitize their local newspaper, The Clewiston News and have the digital versions added to the free, open access Florida Digital Newspaper Library.

== Sites of interest ==
- Ah-Tah-Thi-Ki Seminole Indian Museum, 32 miles (51 km) south of Clewiston in the Big Cypress Indian Reservation
- Clewiston Inn
- Clewiston Museum
- Dixie Crystal Theatre
- Lake Okeechobee Scenic Trail (LOST)
- Tony's Mound
- U.S. Sugar Headquarters & Factory

== Notable people ==
- Archie Boston Jr., graphic artist and retired professor.
- Steffon Bradford, professional basketball player
- Hayward Davis, former member of Florida Senate
- Randy Dixon, former NFL football player
- Titus Dixon, former NFL football player
- Reggie Freeman, former NFL football player
- Glenn Glass, former NFL football player
- Eric Green, former NFL football player
- Deon Humphrey, former NFL football player
- Goodwin Liu, associate justice of the Supreme Court of California
- Alfonso Marshall, former NFL football player
- Roland Martin, professional fisherman
- Anthony Midget, NFL coach and former NFL football player
- Dan Miller, former NFL football player
- Quorey Payne, former professional Arena football player
- Junior Tucker, singer

== See also ==
- Executive House
