= Clewiston Museum =

Local history museum in Florida, United States

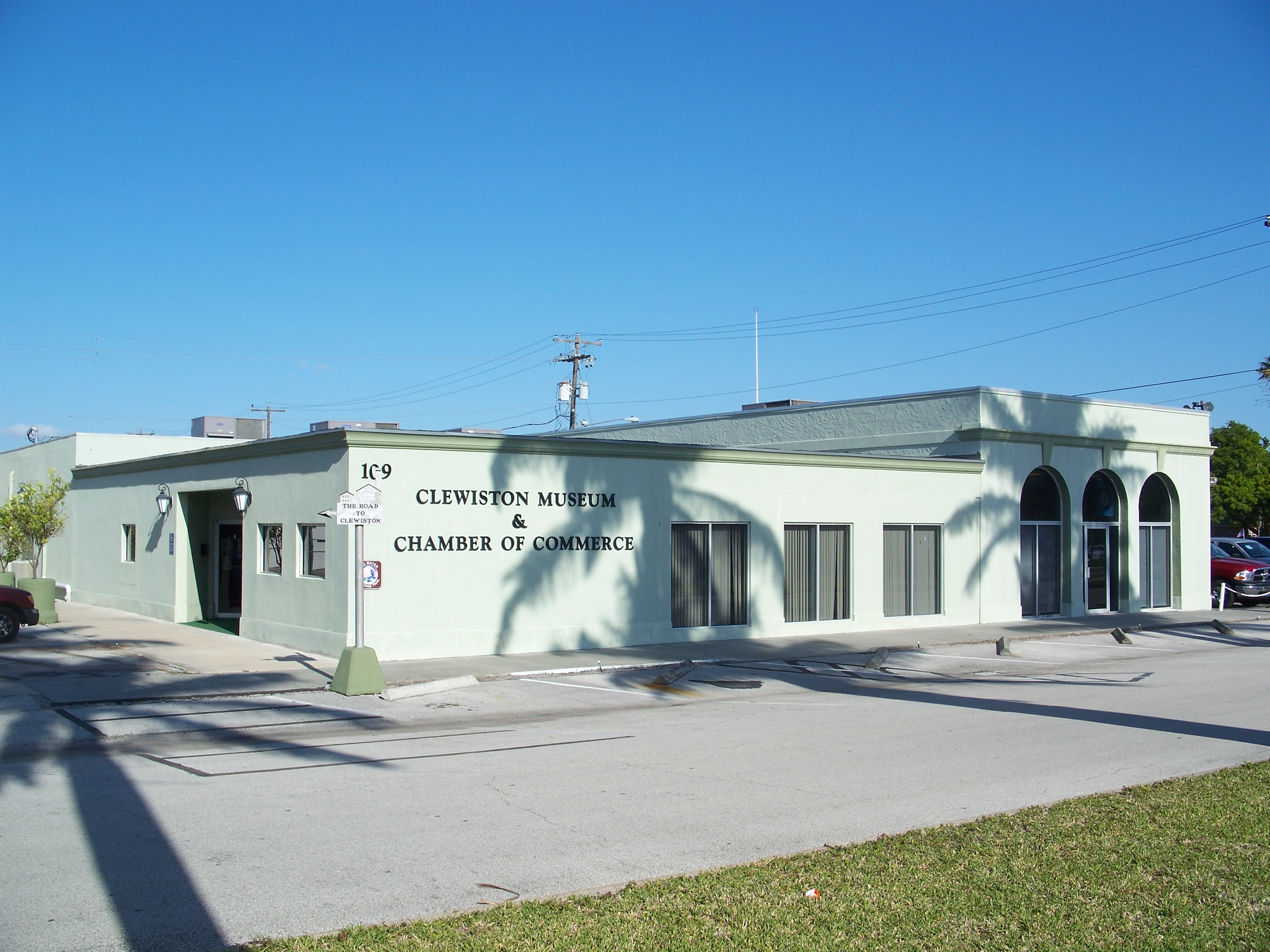

- Location within Florida
- Location: 109 Central Avenue; Clewiston, Florida
- Coordinates: 26.753534°N 80.93448°W
- Type: Culture, History
- Curator: Butch Wilson
- Website: clewistonmuseum.org

The Clewiston Museum is located at 109 Central Avenue, Clewiston, Florida. It houses exhibits highlighting the local area, including: Fossils, Sugar, Cattle Industry First, Commercial Fishing, Flying Brits, Killer Hurricanes and Seminole Indians. The museum also has a 60-seat theater showing videos on history and agriculture. It features an extensive display on sugar planting, harvesting, and processing.

== See also ==
- Dixie Crystal Theatre
