= Florida Digital Newspaper Library =

Newspaper archive in Florida, United States

- Type: Subsidiary
- Industry: Library
- Founded: April 2006
- Headquarters: Gainesville, Florida, United States
- Parent: George A. Smathers Libraries
- Website: ufdc.ufl.edu/newspapers

The Florida Digital Newspaper Library provides access to the news and history of Florida through local Florida newspapers. The Florida Digital Newspaper Library is supported by the University of Florida's George A. Smathers Libraries and hosted in the University of Florida Digital Collections, funded partially by grants and sources, including Florida's Library Services and Technology Act (LSTA) Grants Program, the National Endowment for the Humanities' National Digital Newspaper Program, the Institute for Museum and Library Services, the University of Florida, by Florida Heritage Project funds from the University of North Florida and the University of South Florida, and with the assistance of a digital library endowment from the Estate of the late Governor and Mrs. C. Farris Bryant (whose papers are within the Bryant Collection).

In addition to multiple funding sources, these newspapers are indexed and included in multiple collections, including Chronicling America, and being indexed by the Florida Electronic Library and Google News Archive.

== Collection Themes and Titles ==
The Florida Digital Newspaper Library includes newspapers by Cuban exiles, like El Avance Criollo which was published in Cuba and then continued in Miami. Other titles include:

- Citrus County Chronicle (Inverness and Crystal River, Fla.) 1890-current (LCCN sn87070035): The Citrus County (FL) Chronicle was begun by Albert M. Williamson in July 1890 as a means of announcing goods for sale to people in the Inverness (FL) and Floral City (FL) areas to the north of Tampa (FL). Walter Warnock, the county clerk in Inverness, assumed ownership of the paper in the late 1890s and added news items and features. George Butler, then 70 years old, became owner and editor of the Citrus County Chronicle in 1914, and later that year Albert W. Butler became editor and owner. Joseph J. Wilson, of Clearwater, took over the paper in April 1929 and was an activist editor promoting goals to return the area to prosperity.
  Taylor Dawson became the editor in 1935, the same year the Scofield Publishing Company, owner of the Citrus County Chronicle, also acquired the Dunnellon (FL) Sun (LCCN: sn98026435). Scofield sold the paper in May 1946 to N.A. Perry of Bradenton, who sold shortly afterward to J.R. Hough. A year later, Col. George H. Johnson bought both the Citrus County Chronicle and the Dunnellon Sun from Hough. Then in 1948, the Citrus County Chronicle was sold to Paul W. Ramsey who had been the city editor at the Chicago Sun (LCCN: sn87082566). Ramsey sold the paper to the Bennett-Hahn Company in June 1959, which then sold it to Frances and Carl Turner of Wisconsin.
  At Turner's death in 1962, his wife sold the paper to a St. Petersburg (FL) group that included Herman Goldner, the former mayor of St. Petersburg. It was then bought by David S. Arthurs and in September 1980 merged with Landmark Community Newspapers, Inc. The Citrus County Chronicle became a daily in 1986, serving all of Citrus County. The newspaper is currently (ca. 2007) owned by Landmark Communications, Inc. In July 1990, the paper moved from Inverness to Crystal River. Citrus Publishing also publishes weekly editions of Sumter County Times (LCCN: sn95072059), Riverland News (LCCN: sn96027433), South Marion Citizen, the Visitor, Chiefland Citizen (LCCN: sn96027361) and Williston Sun News Pioneer.
- The Tropical Sun
