= Florida Electronic Library =

The Florida Electronic Library (FEL) was founded in 2003 to provide nearly 200 million articles, ebooks, and other digital resources to the citizens of Florida. The FEL partners with Florida's public libraries in order to enhance the availability of resources and services to patrons.

== History ==
The FEL is funded through the Library Services and Technology Act from the Institute of Museum and Library Services, which is administered by the Florida Department of State’s Division of Library and Information Sciences.

The FEL website uses Geo-IP Authentication to recognize that users are Florida residents and therefore have access to the FEL resources. This allows users to access the website without having to use their library identification card's barcode. If Florida residents are traveling outside of Florida, they will need to enter their library card barcode in order to access the FEL.

== Services and Resources ==
The FEL offers digital resources such as books, magazines, and newspapers focused on a variety of topics, including current events, business, education, technology, and health issues. Users are able to conduct their search according to 18 different interests, including interests titled "The Caregiver," "The Job Seeker," "The Researcher," "The Small Business Owner," "The Student," and "The Health Care Professional." Selecting one of the interests will provide an automatic list of ebooks, online resources, and databases relevant to the selected interest.

The "Browse By" tool of the FEL allows users to easily locate resources relating to Homework & Research, Body & Mind, DIY & Small Business, Career & Jobs, Magazines & Newspapers, Arts & Culture, History & Society, and Florida. Selecting one of the "Browse By" options provides resources and research topics relating to each subject. The Homework & Research page lists separate categories for elementary, middle, high school, and college students as well as educators.

Ebooks are available through the Gale Virtual Reference Library and SAGE Platforms. Ebooks are organized according to the topics of Arts, Biography, Business, Education, Environment, General Reference, History, Law, Literature, Medicine, Multicultural Studies, Nation & World, Science, and Social Science.

The "All Resources" search option guides users by dividing resources according to alphabetical order, subjects, grade level, ebooks, or popularity.

In addition to providing access to digital resources, the FEL also includes the service Ask a Librarian, which allows patrons with a virtual reference service. Users can directly message librarians using text messaging or live chat 10 a.m. to midnight Sunday through Thursday (ET), and from 10 a.m. to 5 p.m. Friday and Saturday (ET). Users can email librarians through Ask a Librarian 24 hours a day, 7 days a week.
