= National Register of Historic Places listings in Monroe County, Florida =

Location of Monroe County in Florida

This is a list of the National Register of Historic Places listings in Monroe County, Florida.

This is intended to be a complete list of the properties and districts on the National Register of Historic Places in Monroe County, Florida, United States. The locations of National Register properties and districts for which the latitude and longitude coordinates are included below, may be seen in a map.

There are 58 properties and districts listed on the National Register in the county, including four National Historic Landmarks.

This National Park Service list is complete through NPS recent listings posted November 13, 2025.

Contents: Counties in Florida (non-linked contain no National Register listings)
Alachua - Baker - Bay - Bradford - Brevard - Broward - Calhoun - Charlotte - Citrus - Clay - Collier - Columbia - DeSoto - Dixie - Duval - Escambia - Flagler - Franklin - Gadsden - Gilchrist - Glades - Gulf - Hamilton - Hardee - Hendry - Hernando - Highlands - Hillsborough (Tampa) - Holmes - Indian River - Jackson - Jefferson - Lafayette - Lake - Lee - Leon - Levy - Liberty - Madison - Manatee - Marion - Martin - Miami-Dade (Miami) - Monroe - Nassau - Okaloosa - Okeechobee - Orange - Osceola - Palm Beach - Pasco - Pinellas - Polk - Putnam - St. Johns - St. Lucie - Santa Rosa - Sarasota - Seminole - Sumter - Suwannee - Taylor - Union - Volusia - Wakulla - Walton - Washington

== Current listings ==
| | Name on the Register | Image | Date listed | Location | City or town | Description |
|---|---|---|---|---|---|---|
| 1 | George Adderley House | George Adderley House | September 10, 1992 (#92001243) | 5550 Overseas Highway; 24°43′11″N 81°04′31″W | Marathon | |
| 2 | African Cemetery at Higgs Beach | African Cemetery at Higgs Beach | June 26, 2012 (#12000362) | 1001 Atlantic Blvd. 24°32′54″N 81°47′11″W | Key West | |
| 3 | AFRICAN QUEEN | AFRICAN QUEEN | February 18, 1992 (#91001771) | 99701 Overseas Highway; 25°05′44″N 80°26′18″W | Key Largo | |
| 4 | Alligator Reef Light | Alligator Reef Light | December 1, 2011 (#11000860) | Offshore 3.5 mi. S. of Upper Matecumbe Key; 24°51′06″N 80°37′06″W | Islamorada | part of the Light Stations of the United States MPS |
| 5 | American Shoal Light | American Shoal Light | January 25, 2011 (#10001189) | Offshore of the lower Florida Keys, 9.6 miles southwest of Summerland Key; 24°31′30″N 81°31′10″W | Summerland Key | part of the Light Stations of the United States MPS |
| 6 | Angustias Shipwreck Site | Angustias Shipwreck Site | June 15, 2006 (#06000492) | Approximately 1-mile (1.6 km) south of U.S. Route 1 in Long Key Channel; 24°47′24″N 80°51′46″W | Layton | Part of the 1733 Spanish Plate Fleet Shipwrecks MPS |
| 7 | The Armory | The Armory | March 11, 1971 (#71000243) | 600 White Street; 24°33′35″N 81°47′39″W | Key West | |
| 8 | Bat Tower-Sugarloaf Key | Bat Tower-Sugarloaf Key | May 13, 1982 (#82002377) | 1 mile (1.6 km) northwest of U.S. Route 1 on Perky Key; 24°39′00″N 81°34′10″W | Sugarloaf Key | |
| 9 | Bear Lake Mounds Archeological District | | November 5, 1996 (#96001182) | Address Restricted | Flamingo | Part of the Archeological Resources of Everglades National Park MPS |
| 10 | Cane Patch | | November 5, 1996 (#96001179) | Address Restricted | Everglades City | Part of the Archeological Resources of Everglades National Park MPS |
| 11 | Carysfort Lighthouse | Carysfort Lighthouse | October 31, 1984 (#84000199) | Key Largo National Marine Sanctuary; 25°13′17″N 80°12′40″W | Key Largo | |
| 12 | Chaves Shipwreck Site | Chaves Shipwreck Site | June 15, 2006 (#06000493) | Seaward end of Snake Creek off Windley Key; 24°56′11″N 80°34′58″W | Islamorada | Part of the 1733 Spanish Plate Fleet Shipwrecks MPS |
| 13 | Crane Point | Crane Point | October 28, 2021 (#100007123) | 5550 Overseas Highway; 24°43′11″N 81°04′31″W | Marathon | |
| 14 | Dry Tortugas National Park | Dry Tortugas National Park | October 26, 1992 (#01000228) | 70 miles (110 km) west of Key West; 24°37′43″N 82°52′24″W | Key West | |
| 15 | El Gallo Indiano Shipwreck Site | El Gallo Indiano Shipwreck Site | June 15, 2006 (#06000494) | Seaward end of channel #5 between Craig Key and Long Key; 24°48′39″N 80°45′57″W | Layton | Part of the 1733 Spanish Plate Fleet Shipwrecks MPS |
| 16 | El Infante Shipwreck Site | | June 15, 2006 (#06000496) | 4 miles (6.4 km) offshore Plantation Key; 24°42′08″N 80°28′48″W | Plantation | Part of the 1733 Spanish Plate Fleet Shipwrecks MPS |
| 17 | El Rubi Shipwreck Site | El Rubi Shipwreck Site | June 15, 2006 (#06000497) | 4 miles (6.4 km) offshore Plantation Key; 24°55′30″N 80°30′54″W | Tavernier | Part of the 1733 Spanish Plate Fleet Shipwrecks MPS |
| 18 | Florida Keys Memorial | Florida Keys Memorial | March 16, 1995 (#95000238) | U.S. Route 1 at Mile Marker 81.5; 24°55′02″N 80°38′09″W | Islamorada | |
| 19 | Fort Jefferson National Monument | Fort Jefferson National Monument | November 10, 1970 (#70000069) | 68 miles (109 km) west of Key West in the Gulf of Mexico; 24°37′37″N 82°52′23″W | Dry Tortugas Islands | |
| 20 | Fort Zachary Taylor | Fort Zachary Taylor | March 11, 1971 (#71000244) | U.S. Naval Station; 24°32′51″N 81°48′37″W | Key West | |
| 21 | Eduardo H. Gato House | Eduardo H. Gato House | April 11, 1973 (#73000586) | 1209 Virginia Street; 24°33′19″N 81°47′25″W | Key West | |
| 22 | Ernest Hemingway House | Ernest Hemingway House | November 24, 1968 (#68000023) | 907 Whitehead Street; 24°33′04″N 81°48′02″W | Key West | |
| 23 | Herrara Shipwreck Site | Herrara Shipwreck Site | June 15, 2006 (#06000495) | 2½ miles offshore Whale Harbor; 24°54′21″N 80°35′32″W | Islamorada | Part of the 1733 Spanish Plate Fleet Shipwrecks MPS |
| 24 | Indian Key | Indian Key | June 19, 1972 (#72000342) | Indian Key; 24°52′41″N 80°40′36″W | Lower Matecumbe Key | |
| 25 | INGHAM (USCGC) | INGHAM (USCGC) | April 27, 1992 (#92001879) | East quay wall at the Truman Waterfront, at the end of Southard St. 24°33′08″N 81°48′27″W | Key West | Relocated from Charleston, South Carolina |
| 26 | John Pennekamp Coral Reef State Park and Reserve | John Pennekamp Coral Reef State Park and Reserve | April 14, 1972 (#72000340) | U.S. Route 1; 25°10′41″N 80°18′07″W | Key Largo | |
| 27 | Key West Historic District | Key West Historic District | March 11, 1971 (#71000245) | Bounded approximately by White, Angela, Windsor, Passover, Thomas, and Whitehead Streets, and the Gulf of Mexico; also roughly bounded by Emma, Whitehead, White, and South Streets, Mallory Square, and the Atlantic Ocean; 24°33′19″N 81°48′06″W | Key West | Second set of boundaries represents a boundary increase of February 24, 1983 (refnum 83001430) |
| 28 | LaBranche Fishing Camp | | May 9, 1997 (#97000404) | Address Restricted | Islamorada | |
| 29 | Lignumvitae Key Archeological and Historical District | Lignumvitae Key Archeological and Historical District | February 16, 1999 (#98000652) | Address Restricted; 24°54′07″N 80°41′58″W | Islamorada | |
| 30 | Little White House | Little White House | February 12, 1974 (#74000652) | Naval Station; 24°33′23″N 81°48′25″W | Key West | |
| 31 | Martello Gallery-Key West Art and Historical Museum | Martello Gallery-Key West Art and Historical Museum | June 19, 1972 (#72000341) | South Roosevelt Boulevard; 24°33′07″N 81°45′18″W | Key West | |
| 32 | Matecumbe Methodist Church | Matecumbe Methodist Church | November 24, 2020 (#100005820) | 81831 Overseas Hwy. 24°55′02″N 80°38′08″W | Islamorada | |
| 33 | Matecumbe Methodist Church Cemetery | Matecumbe Methodist Church Cemetery | February 5, 2021 (#100006117) | 81801 Overseas Hwy. 24°55′02″N 80°38′09″W | Islamorada | |
| 34 | Mud Lake Canal | Mud Lake Canal | September 20, 2006 (#06000979) | Cape Sable in Everglades National Park; 25°10′26″N 80°56′17″W | Flamingo | |
| 35 | Old Post Office and Customshouse | Old Post Office and Customshouse | September 20, 1973 (#73000587) | Front Street; 24°33′30″N 81°48′25″W | Key West | |
| 36 | Overseas Highway and Railway Bridges | Overseas Highway and Railway Bridges | August 13, 1979 (#79000684) | Bridges on U.S. Route 1 between Long and Conch Key, Knight and Little Duck Key, and Bahia Honda and Spanish Key; also parallel to U.S. Route 1 (approximately between mile markers 9.8 and 72.8); 24°42′42″N 81°07′23″W | Florida Keys | "Parallel to U.S. Route 1" represents a boundary increase of August 3, 2004 |
| 37 | Pigeon Key Historic District | Pigeon Key Historic District | March 16, 1990 (#90000443) | Off U.S. Route 1 at mile marker 45; 24°42′14″N 81°09′19″W | Pigeon Key | |
| 38 | Dr. Joseph Y. Porter House | Dr. Joseph Y. Porter House | June 4, 1973 (#73000588) | 429 Caroline Street; 24°33′26″N 81°48′17″W | Key West | |
| 39 | Rock Mound Archeological Site | | July 1, 1975 (#75000562) | Address Restricted | Key Largo | |
| 40 | Rookery Mound | | November 5, 1996 (#96001183) | Address Restricted | Everglades City | Part of the Archeological Resources of Everglades National Park MPS |
| 41 | SAN FELIPE Shipwreck Site | | August 11, 1994 (#94000794) | Address Restricted | Islamorada | Part of the 1733 Spanish Plate Fleet Shipwrecks MPS |
| 42 | San Francisco Shipwreck Site | San Francisco Shipwreck Site | June 15, 2006 (#06000499) | Seaward end of Channel #2 off Craig Key; 24°49′11″N 80°45′26″W | Layton | Part of the 1733 Spanish Plate Fleet Shipwrecks MPS |
| 43 | SAN JOSE Shipwreck Site | | March 18, 1975 (#75002123) | Address Restricted | Plantation Key | Part of the 1733 Spanish Plate Fleet Shipwrecks MPS |
| 44 | SAN PEDRO (shipwreck) | | May 31, 2001 (#01000530) | 1¼ miles south of Indian Key; 24°51′18″N 80°40′36″W | Islamorada | Part of the 1733 Spanish Plate Fleet Shipwrecks MPS |
| 45 | Sand Key Lighthouse | Sand Key Lighthouse | April 11, 1973 (#73000589) | 7 miles (11 km) southwest of Key West on Sand Key; 24°27′50″N 81°52′46″W | Key West | |
| 46 | Sloppy Joe's Bar | Sloppy Joe's Bar | November 1, 2006 (#06000957) | 201 Duval Street; 24°33′33″N 81°48′18″W | Key West | |
| 47 | Sombrero Key Light | Sombrero Key Light | March 9, 2012 (#12000092) | Offshore approximately 5.5-mile (8.9 km) SSW of Marathon; 24°37′40″N 81°06′42″W | Marathon | part of the Light Stations of the United States MPS |
| 48 | Sueco de Arizon Shipwreck Site | Sueco de Arizon Shipwreck Site | June 15, 2006 (#06000500) | 1,600 yards (1,500 m) offshore Conch Key; 24°46′41″N 80°53′19″W | Layton | Part of the 1733 Spanish Plate Fleet Shipwrecks MPS |
| 49 | Ten Thousand Islands Archeological District | Ten Thousand Islands Archeological District | November 5, 1996 (#96001180) | Address Restricted | Everglades City | Part of the Archeological Resources of Everglades National Park MPS |
| 50 | Thompson Fish House, Turtle Cannery and Kraals | Thompson Fish House, Turtle Cannery and Kraals | June 23, 1994 (#94000633) | 200 Margaret Street; 24°33′42″N 81°48′04″W | Key West | |
| 51 | Tres Puentes Shipwreck Site | | June 15, 2006 (#06000501) | Seaward edge of Hawk Channel of Islamorada; 24°53′38″N 80°35′02″W | Islamorada | Part of the 1733 Spanish Plate Fleet Shipwrecks MPS |
| 52 | U.S. Coast Guard Headquarters, Key West Station | U.S. Coast Guard Headquarters, Key West Station | October 15, 1973 (#73000590) | Northwestern corner of Front and Whitehead Streets; 24°33′32″N 81°48′25″W | Key West | |
| 53 | US Naval Station | US Naval Station | May 8, 1984 (#84000915) | Roughly bounded by Whitehead, Eaton, and Caroline Streets; 24°33′20″N 81°48′23″W | Key West | |
| 54 | USCG Cutter DUANE | USCG Cutter DUANE | May 16, 2002 (#02000494) | 1-mile (1.6 km) south of Molasses Reef; 24°59′28″N 80°22′53″W | Key Largo | |
| 55 | USS ALLIGATOR | USS ALLIGATOR | June 6, 1996 (#96000581) | Address Restricted | Islamorada | |
| 56 | Veterans of Foreign Wars Walter R. Mickens Post 6021 and William Weech American Legion Post 168 | Veterans of Foreign Wars Walter R. Mickens Post 6021 and William Weech American Legion Post 168 | May 30, 2012 (#12000300) | 803 Emma St. 24°33′03″N 81°48′13″W | Key West | |
| 57 | West Martello Tower | West Martello Tower | June 24, 1976 (#76000602) | Monroe County beach between Reynolds and White Streets; 24°32′49″N 81°47′10″W | Key West | |
| 58 | WESTERN UNION (schooner) | WESTERN UNION (schooner) | May 16, 1984 (#84000930) | Pier A, Truman Annex; 24°33′26″N 81°48′30″W | Key West | |

== See also ==
- List of National Historic Landmarks in Florida
- National Register of Historic Places listings in Florida
