= List of places in Florida: P =

This list of current cities, towns, unincorporated communities, counties, and other recognized places in the U.S. state of Florida also includes information on the number and names of counties in which the place lies, and its lower and upper zip code bounds, if applicable.

Name of place	Number of counties	Counties	Lower zip code	Upper zip code
Pablo Keys	1	Duval		
Pace	1	Santa Rosa	32571	
Packwood Place	1	Volusia		
Padlock	1	Suwannee		
Page Field	1	Lee	33907	
Page Park	1	Lee	33901	
Page Park-Pine Manor	1	Lee		
Pahokee	1	Palm Beach	33476	
Painters Hill	1	Flagler	32036	
Paisley	1	Lake	32767	
Palatka	1	Putnam	32177	
Palma Ceia	1	Hillsborough	33629	
Palm Acres	1	Lee	33901	
Palm Aire	1	Broward	33069	
Palma Sola	1	Manatee	34280	
Palma Sola Park	1	Manatee	33505	
Palm Bay	1	Brevard	32905	
Palm Beach	1	Palm Beach	33480	
Palm Beach Farms	1	Palm Beach		
Palm Beach Gardens	1	Palm Beach	33410	
Palm Beach Lakes	1	Palm Beach		
Palm Beach Shores	1	Palm Beach	33404	
Palm City	1	Martin	34990	
Palm Coast	1	Flagler	32137	
Palmdale	1	Glades	33944	
Palmetto	1	Manatee	34221	
Palmetto Bay	1	Miami-Dade	33157	
Palmetto Estates	1	Miami-Dade	33157	
Palmetto Junction	1	Manatee		
Palm Harbor	1	Pinellas	34683	
Palmo	1	St. Johns		
Palmona Park	1	Lee		
Palm Plaza	1	Sarasota	33583	
Palm River	1	Collier		
Palm River	1	Hillsborough	33619	
Palm River-Clair Mel	1	Hillsborough		
Palm River Estates	1	Collier	33940	
Palm Shadows	1	Seminole		
Palm Shores	1	Brevard	32935	
Palm Springs	1	Palm Beach	33461	
Palm Springs Estates	1	Miami-Dade		
Palm Springs North	1	Miami-Dade	33015	
Palm Valley	1	St. Johns	32082	
Palm Valley Landing	1	St. Johns		
Palm View	1	Manatee	33561	
Palm Village	1	Miami-Dade	33012	
Paloma Park	1	Lee	33903	
Panacea	1	Wakulla	32346	
Panacea Park	1	Wakulla	32346	
Panacoochee Retreats	1	Sumter	33538	
Panama City	1	Bay	32401	17
Panama City Beach	1	Bay	32407	
Panama Heights	1	Washington		
Panama Park	1	Duval	32223	
Panasoffkee	1	Sumter		
Paola	1	Seminole	32771	
Paolita Station	1	Collier	33929	
Paradise	1	Alachua		
Paradise Bay	1	Manatee	33505	
Paradise Beach	1	Escambia	32561	
Paradise Heights	1	Orange		
Paradise Palms	1	Palm Beach	33432	
Paradise Park	1	St. Lucie	33450	
Paradise Point	1	Citrus	32629	
Paradise Shores	1	Lee	33905	
Park	1	Polk		
Park Avenue	1	Leon	32302	
Park City	1	Broward	33314	
Parker	1	Bay	32404	
Parker Island	1	Highlands		
Parkers	1	Hillsborough		
Parkerville	1	Santa Rosa		
Park Haven	1	Broward		
Parkland	1	Broward	33067	
Park Lane	1	Charlotte		
Park-of-the-Palms	1	Clay	32656	
Parkside	1	Leon		
Parmalee	1	Manatee	33551	
Paront	1	Jackson	32442	
Parramore	1	Jackson		
Parrish	1	Manatee	34219	
Pasadena	1	Pinellas	33707	
Pasadena Hills	1	Pasco		
Pasadena Shores	1	Pasco		
Pasco	1	Pasco	33525	
Pass-a-Grille	1	Pinellas		
Pass-a-Grille Beach	1	Pinellas	33706	
Pass Station	1	Clay		
Patersonville	1	Putnam		
Patrick Space Force Base	1	Brevard	32925	
Patrick SFB North	1	Brevard		
Patrick SFB South	1	Brevard		
Paxon	1	Duval	32205	
Paxton	1	Walton	32538	
Peace River Shores	1	Charlotte	33950	
Peach Orchard	1	Alachua	32618	
Peaden	1	Okaloosa		
Pea Ridge	1	Santa Rosa		
Pearl Court	1	Duval		
Pebble Creek	1	Hillsborough		
Pebbledale	1	Polk		
Pecan	1	Putnam		
Pecan Park	1	Duval	32218	
Peck	1	Leon		
Peddys Mill	1	Polk	33860	
Pedro	1	Marion	32691	
Pelican Bay	1	Collier		
Pelican Lake	1	Palm Beach	33491	
Pembroke	1	Polk	33841	
Pembroke Park	1	Broward	33009	
Pembroke Pines	1	Broward	33024	
Peniel	1	Putnam	32077	
Peninsula	1	Hillsborough	33609	
Peninsula	1	Volusia	32118	
Penney Farms	1	Clay	32079	
Pennichaw	1	Volusia		
Pennsuco	1	Miami-Dade	33010	
Pensacola	1	Escambia	32501	98
Pensacola Beach	1	Escambia	32561	
Pensacola Naval Aerospace and Regional Medical Center	1	Escambia	32512	
Pensacola Naval Air Station	1	Escambia	32508	
Pensacola Naval Public Works Center	1	Escambia	32508	
Pensacola Shores	1	Santa Rosa	32561	
Peoples City	1	Marion	32681	
Peppertree Bay	1	Sarasota	33580	
Perdido Bay	1	Escambia		
Perdido Heights	1	Escambia		
Perdido Key	1	Escambia	32507	
Perkins	1	Leon		
Perky	1	Monroe		
Perrine	1	Miami-Dade	33157	
Perry	1	Taylor	32347	
Peters	1	Miami-Dade	33157	
Peterson	1	Lafayette		
Phifer	1	Alachua		
Phillippi Gardens	1	Sarasota	33581	
Phosphoria	1	Polk		
Pickettville	1	Duval	32205	
Picnic	1	Hillsborough	33547	
Picolata	1	St. Johns	32084	
Pidgeon Key	1	Pinellas		
Piedmont	1	Orange		
Pierce	1	Polk	33860	
Pierson	1	Volusia	32180	
Pigeon Key	1	Monroe		
Pine	1	Escambia		
Pine Air	1	Palm Beach	33406	
Pine Barren	1	Escambia		
Pine Bluff	1	St. Johns		
Pine Bluff	1	Santa Rosa		
Pine Castle	1	Orange	32809	
Pinecraft	1	Sarasota	34239	
Pine Craft	1	Sarasota		
Pine Crest	1	Hillsborough	33614	
Pinecrest	1	Hillsborough	33547	
Pinecrest	1	Miami-Dade	33156	
Pinecrest	1	Monroe		
Pinecrest	1	Seminole		
Pineda	1	Brevard	32935	
Pine Dale	1	Polk	33867	
Pine Forest	1	Escambia	32504	
Pine Grove	1	Brevard	32901	
Pine Grove	1	Osceola	32769	
Pine Grove	1	Suwannee	32060	
Pine Hill Estates	1	Alachua	32601	
Pine Hills	1	Lake		
Pine Hills	1	Orange	32808	
Pine Island	1	Calhoun		
Pine Island	1	Hernando		
Pine Island	1	Lee		
Pine Island Center	1	Lee	33901	
Pine Island Ridge	1	Broward		
Pine Lakes	1	Lake		
Pineland	1	Lee	33945	
Pineland	1	Taylor	32347	
Pineland Gardens	1	Duval	32216	
Pine Level	1	DeSoto	33821	
Pine Level	1	Hillsborough		
Pine Level	1	Santa Rosa		
Pinellas Park	1	Pinellas	34665	
Pine Log	1	Bay	32401	
Pine Manor	1	Lee	33901	
Pine Mount	1	Suwannee		
Pineola	1	Citrus	33536	
Pine Ridge	1	Citrus		
Pine Ridge	1	Collier		
Pine Ridge Country Estates	1	Citrus	32661	
Pine Shores	1	Sarasota	33581	
Pinesville	1	Alachua	32618	
Pine Top	1	Baker		
Pinetta	1	Madison	32350	
Pineville	1	Escambia	36502	
Pineway	1	Okaloosa		
Pinewood	1	Miami-Dade	33168	
Pinewood Park	1	Miami-Dade		
Piney Grove	1	Walton		
Piney Point	1	Manatee	33561	
Pinhook	1	Jefferson		
Pinland	1	Taylor		
Pioneer	1	Hendry		
Pioneer Village	1	Lee	33903	
Pipers Glen	1	Palm Beach		
Pirate Harbor	1	Charlotte	33950	
Pirates Cove	1	Monroe		
Pittman	1	Holmes	32427	
Pittman	1	Lake		
Pittsburg	1	Polk		
Placida	1	Charlotte	33946	
Placid Lakes	1	Highlands		
Plains	1	Highlands		
Plantation	1	Broward	33317	
Plantation	1	Monroe	33070	
Plantation	1	Sarasota		
Plantation Acres	1	Broward	33314	
Plantation Gardens	1	Broward		
Plantation Island	1	Collier		
Plantation Isles	1	Broward	33314	
Plantation Key	1	Monroe	33036	
Plantation Key Colony	1	Monroe		
Plantation Mobile Home Park	1	Palm Beach		
Plantation Park	1	Broward	33314	
Plant City	1	Hillsborough	33566	
Platt	1	DeSoto	33821	
Playland Estates	1	Broward		
Playland Isles	1	Broward	33314	
Playland Village	1	Broward	33314	
Plaza	1	Marion	32670	
Pleasant Grove	1	Escambia	32507	
Pleasant Grove	1	Hillsborough	33530	
Pleasant Grove	1	Walton	32433	
Pleasant Hill	1	Washington		
Pleasant Ridge	1	Walton	32433	
Plummer	1	Duval	32219	
Plum Orchard	1	Wakulla		
Plymouth	1	Orange	32768	
Poarch Creek Reservation and Trust Lands	1	Escambia		
Poe Springs	1	Gilchrist		
Poinciana	2	Osceola, Polk	34759	
Poinsett Groves	1	Brevard		
Poinsettia Park	1	Polk		
Poinsett Shores	1	Brevard		
Point Baker	1	Santa Rosa		
Point O'Rocks	1	Sarasota		
Point Pleasant	1	Marion		
Point Washington	1	Walton	32454	
Polk City	1	Polk	33868	
Polly Town	1	Duval	32218	
Polo Club Estates	1	Palm Beach	33406	
Pomona Park	1	Putnam	32181	
Pompano Beach	1	Broward	33060	77
Pompano Beach Highlands	1	Broward	33064	
Pompano Estates	1	Broward		
Pompano Isles	1	Broward		
Pompano Park	1	Broward		
Ponce	1	Miami-Dade	33134	
Ponce de Leon	1	Holmes	32455	
Ponce Inlet	1	Volusia	32019	
Ponce Park	1	Volusia		
Pond Creek	1	Walton		
Ponte Vedra	1	St. Johns	32082	
Ponte Vedra Beach	1	St. Johns	32082	
Popash	1	Hendry		
Poplar Head	1	Washington		
Port Boca Grande	1	Lee		
Port Canaveral	1	Brevard		
Port Charlotte	1	Charlotte	33952	
Port Everglades	1	Broward	33316	
Port Everglades Junction	1	Broward		
Port Inglis	1	Levy		
Port LaBelle	1	Hendry	33935	
Port LaBelle Gulf Area	1	Glades		
Portland	1	Walton	32439	
Port Laudania	1	Broward		
Port Leon	1	Wakulla		
Port Lonesome	1	Pasco		
Port Malabar	1	Brevard	32905	
Port Manatee	1	Manatee		
Port Mayaca	1	Martin	33448	
Port of Miami	1	Miami-Dade		
Port of Palm Beach Junction	1	Palm Beach	33404	
Port Orange	1	Volusia	32127	
Port Richey	1	Pasco	34668	
Port St. Joe	1	Gulf	32456	
Port St. Joe Beach	1	Gulf		
Port St. John	1	Brevard	32927	
Port St. Lucie	1	St. Lucie	34985	
Port St. Lucie Northeast	1	St. Lucie		
Port St. Lucie-River Park	1	St. Lucie		
Port Salerno	1	Martin	34992	
Port Sewall	1	Martin	33494	
Port Sutton	1	Hillsborough		
Port Tampa	1	Hillsborough		
Port Tampa City	1	Hillsborough	33616	
Postil	1	Okaloosa		
Potatoville	1	Flagler		
Pottsburg	1	Duval	32216	
Pouchers Corner	1	Suwannee		
Powell	1	Hernando	33512	
Power	1	Escambia		
Poyner	1	Polk		
Prairie	1	Polk		
Prairie Junction	1	Polk		
Pretty Bayou	1	Bay		
Princeton	1	Miami-Dade	33032	
Prine	1	Polk	33844	
Proctor	1	Marion		
Produce	1	Hillsborough	33610	
Progress Village	1	Hillsborough	33619	
Prospect	1	Broward	33309	
Prospect Road	1	Broward	33307	
Prosperity	1	Holmes	32464	
Providence	1	Polk	33805	
Providence	1	Union	32061	
Pumpkin Center	1	Lake	32797	
Punta Gorda	1	Charlotte	33927	83
Punta Gorda Beach	1	Charlotte		
Punta Gorda Isles	1	Charlotte	33950	
Punta Rassa	1	Lee	33901	
Purvis Still	1	Hamilton	32052	
Putnam Hall	1	Putnam	32185	

== See also ==
- Florida
- List of municipalities in Florida
- List of former municipalities in Florida
- List of counties in Florida
- List of census-designated places in Florida
