= List of the 1733 Spanish Plate Fleet Shipwrecks =

- 1733 Spanish Plate Fleet Shipwrecks Multiple Property Submission
- U.S. National Register of Historic Places
- Location within Florida
- Location: Monroe County, Florida
- Coordinates: 25°0′0″N 81°0′0″W
- MPS: "1733 Spanish Plate Fleet Shipwrecks - Multiple Property Documentation Form". National Park Service.
- NRHP reference No.: 64500947

The following shipwrecks in Monroe County, Florida were added to the National Register of Historic Places as part of the 1733 Spanish Plate Fleet Shipwrecks Multiple Property Submission (or MPS).

Resource Name	Also known as	Location	Nearest town/city	Added
San Jose Shipwreck Site	San Jose Y Las Animas or Nao San Jose de Animas	approximately four miles southeast of Plantation Key	Plantation Key vicinity	March 18, 1975
San Felipe Shipwreck Site	El Lerri, El Terri, or Tyrri	east of Lower Matecumbe Key and south of the wreck of the San Pedro.	Islamorada vicinity	August 11, 1994
San Pedro Shipwreck Site		1 1/4 miles south of Indian Key	Islamorada vicinity	May 31, 2001
Angustias Shipwreck Site		approximately a mile south of U.S. 1 in Long Key Channel	Layton vicinity	June 15, 2006
Chavez Shipwreck Site		seaward end of Snake Creek off Windley Key	Islamorada vicinity	June 15, 2006
El Gallo Indiano Shipwreck Site		seaward end of channel #5 bet. Craig Key and Long Key	Layton vicinity	June 15, 2006
El Infante Shipwreck Site		four miles offshore Plantation Key	Plantation vicinity	June 15, 2006
El Rubi Shipwreck Site		four miles offshore Plantation Key	Tavernier vicinity	June 15, 2006
Herrara Shipwreck Site		2 1/2 miles offshore Whale Harbor	Islamorada vicinity	June 15, 2006
Populo Shipwreck Site		Biscayne National Park	Homestead vicinity	June 15, 2006
San Francisco Shipwreck Site		seaward end of Channel #2 off Craig Key	Layton vicinity	June 15, 2006
Sueco de Arizon Shipwreck Site		1,600 yards offshore Conch Key	Layton	June 15, 2006
Tres Puentes Shipwreck Site		seaward edge of Hawk Channel of Islamorada	Islamorada vicinity	June 15, 2006

== Gallery ==
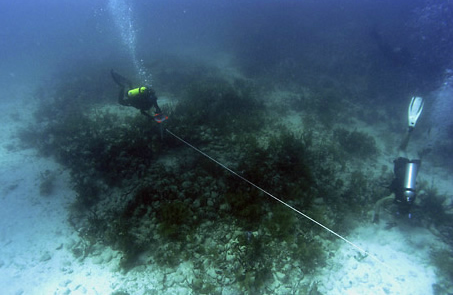
Populo shipwreck site
