= Keystone (limestone) =

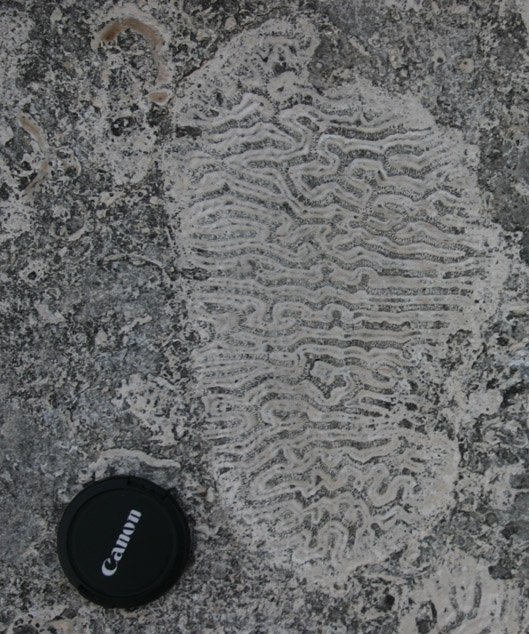
Example of keystone at the Hurricane Monument.

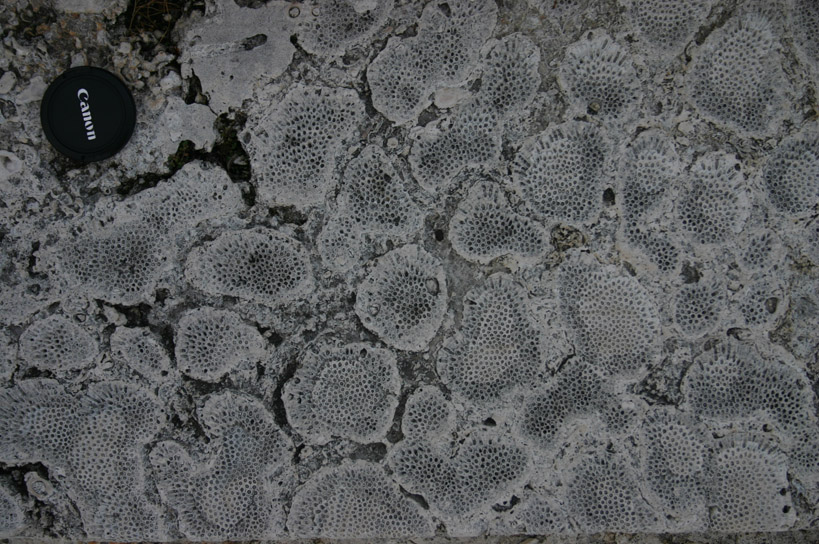
Example of keystone at the Hurricane Monument.

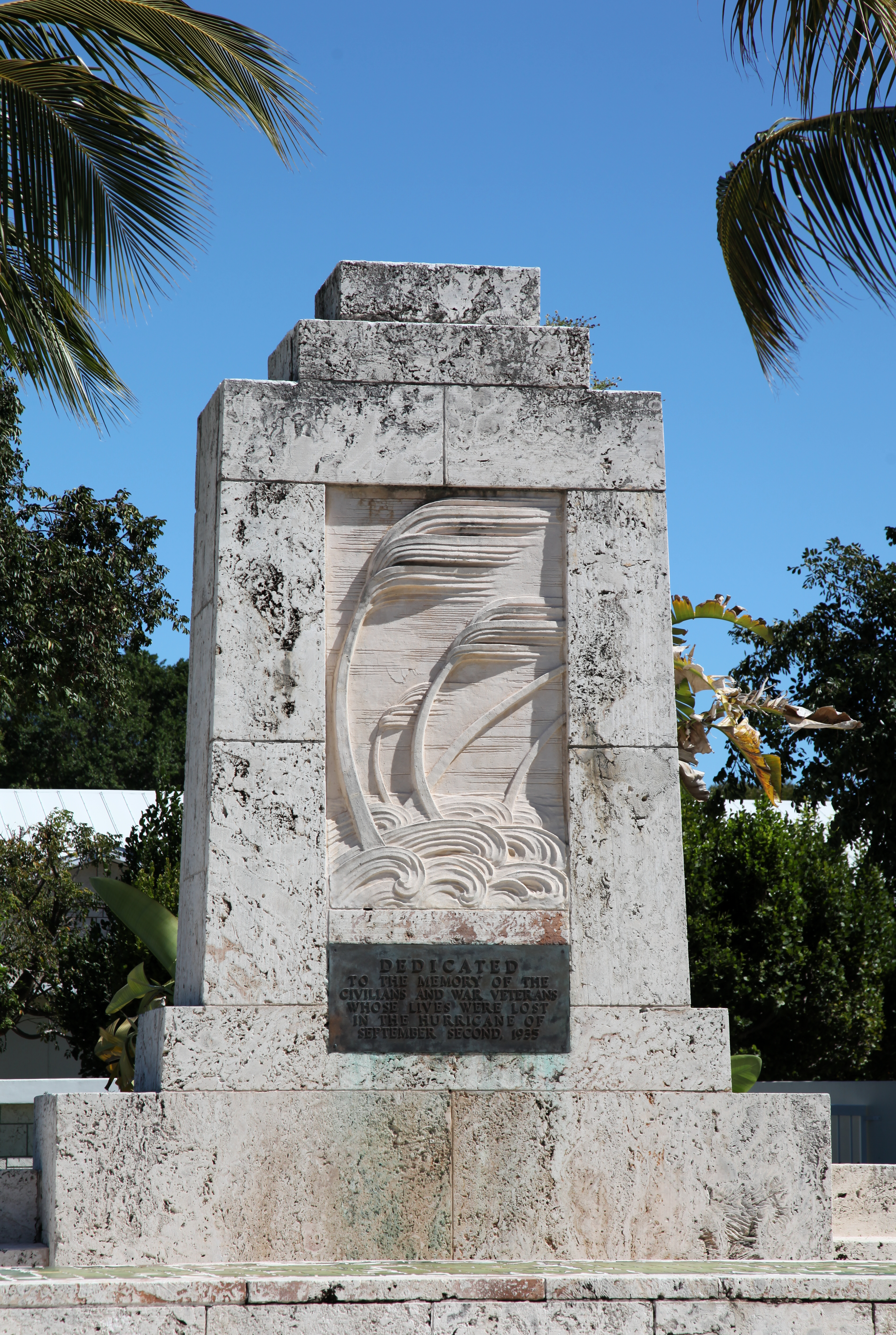
The monument itself

Keystone is a type of limestone, or coral rag, quarried in the Florida Keys, in particular from Windley Key fossil quarry, which is now a State Park of Florida. The limestone is Pleistocene in age, and the rock primarily consists of scleractinian coral, such as Elkhorn coral and Brain coral.

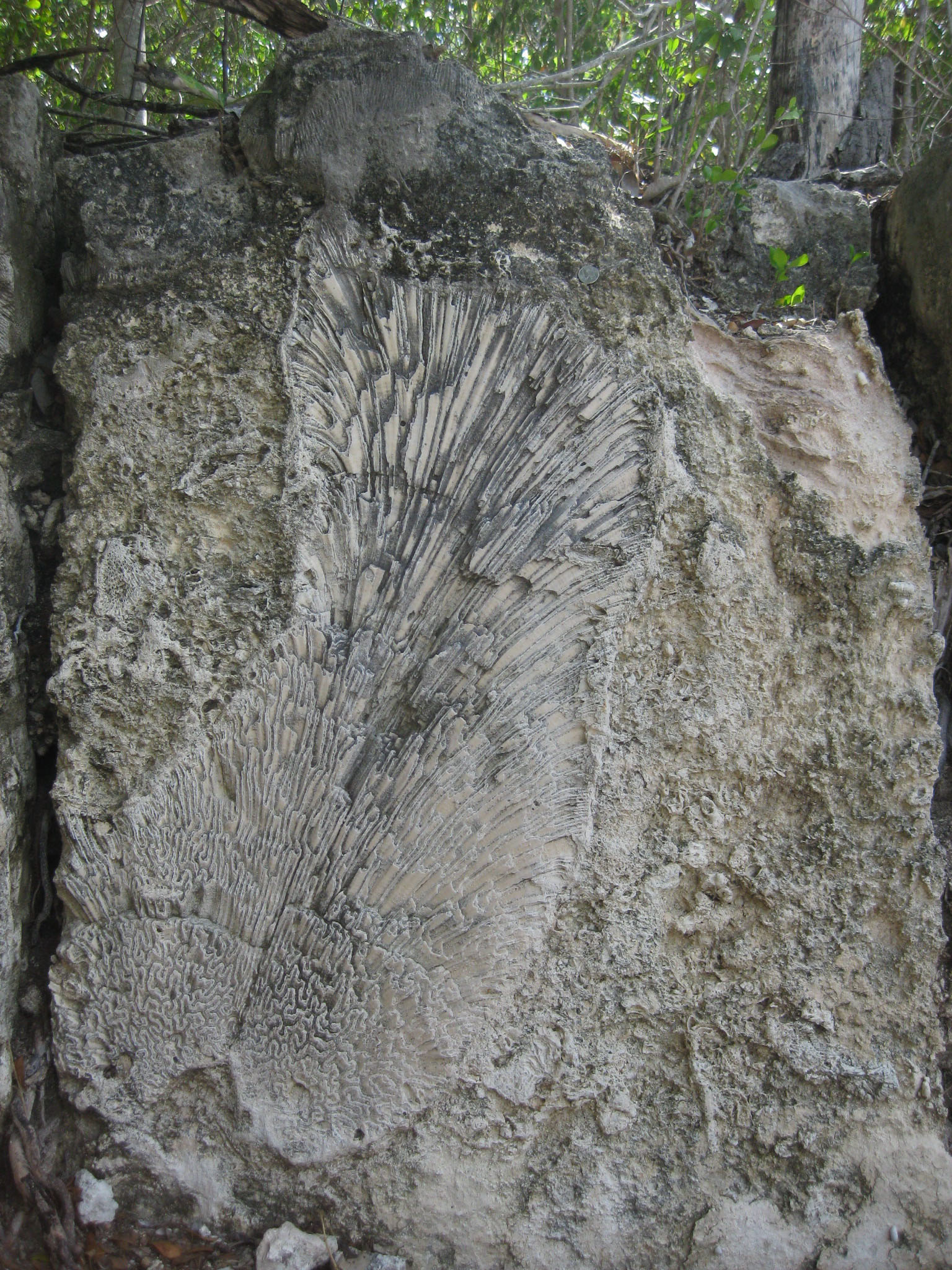
Example of fossil Brain coral (Diploria) at the quarry. US Quarter near top for scale.

The Hurricane Monument, commemorating victims of the Labor Day Hurricane of 1935, and located at mile marker 82 on U.S. Route 1 near Islamorada, is constructed of keystone, as is the David W. Dyer Federal Building and United States Courthouse.

== See also ==
- List of types of limestone
