= Snake Creek Bridge =

Bridge in Florida, United States of America

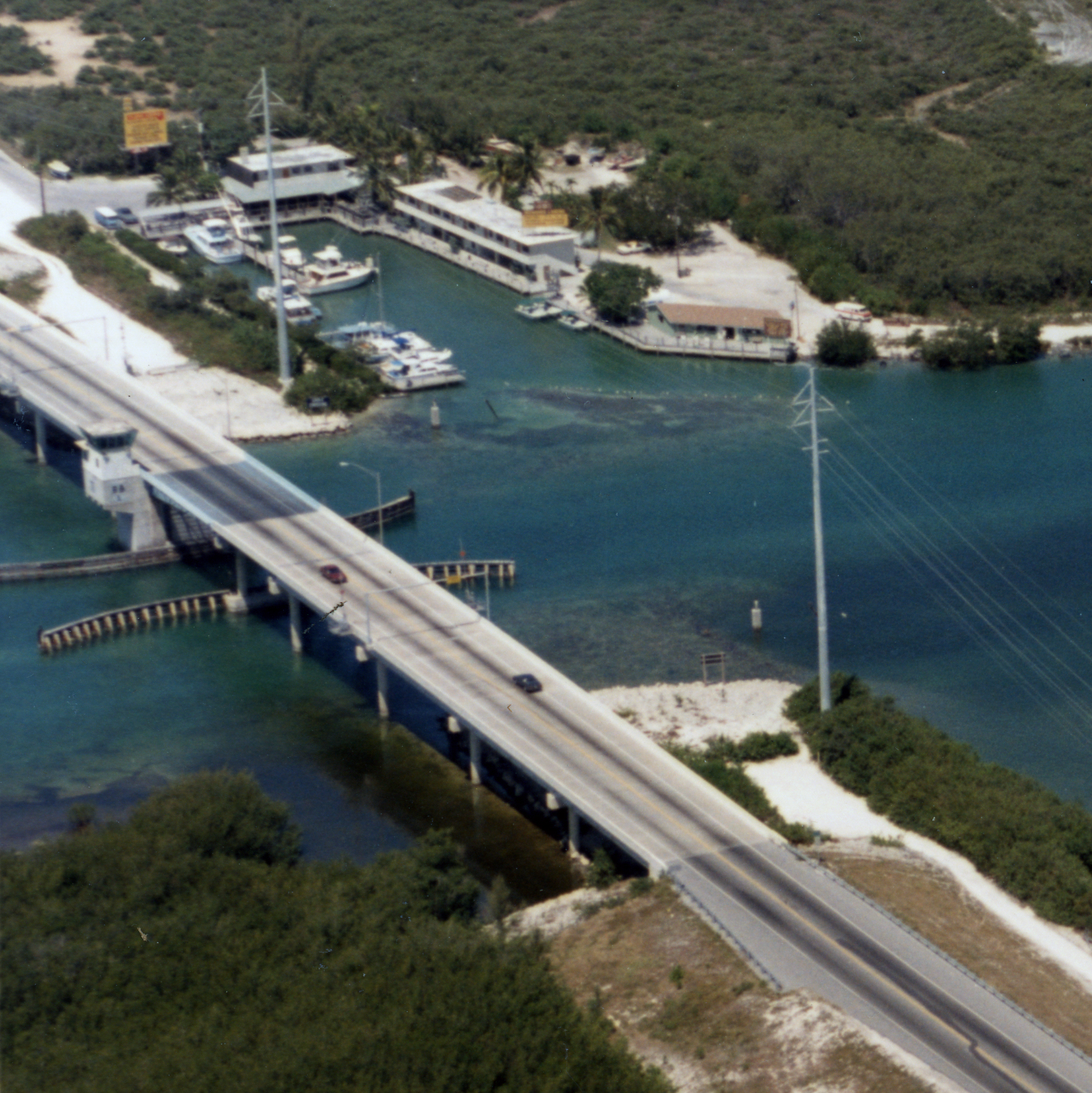
- Aerial photo taken in 1987
- Coordinates: 24.95226°N 80.58769°W
- Carries: US 1 (Overseas Highway)
- Crosses: Snake Creek
- Locale: Islamorada, Florida
- Official name: Snake Creek Bridge
- Maintained by: Florida Department of Transportation

Characteristics
- Design: Bascule bridge

History
- Opened: 1981

Statistics
- Toll: None

Snake Creek Bridge is a bascule bridge in the village of Islamorada in the Florida Keys. The single-leaf steel bascule bridge carries the Overseas Highway (U.S. 1) over Snake Creek, connecting Plantation Key and Windley Key. It is located near mile marker 86. The Snake Creek Bridge is notable for being the only remaining drawbridge operating in the Florida Keys.

== History ==
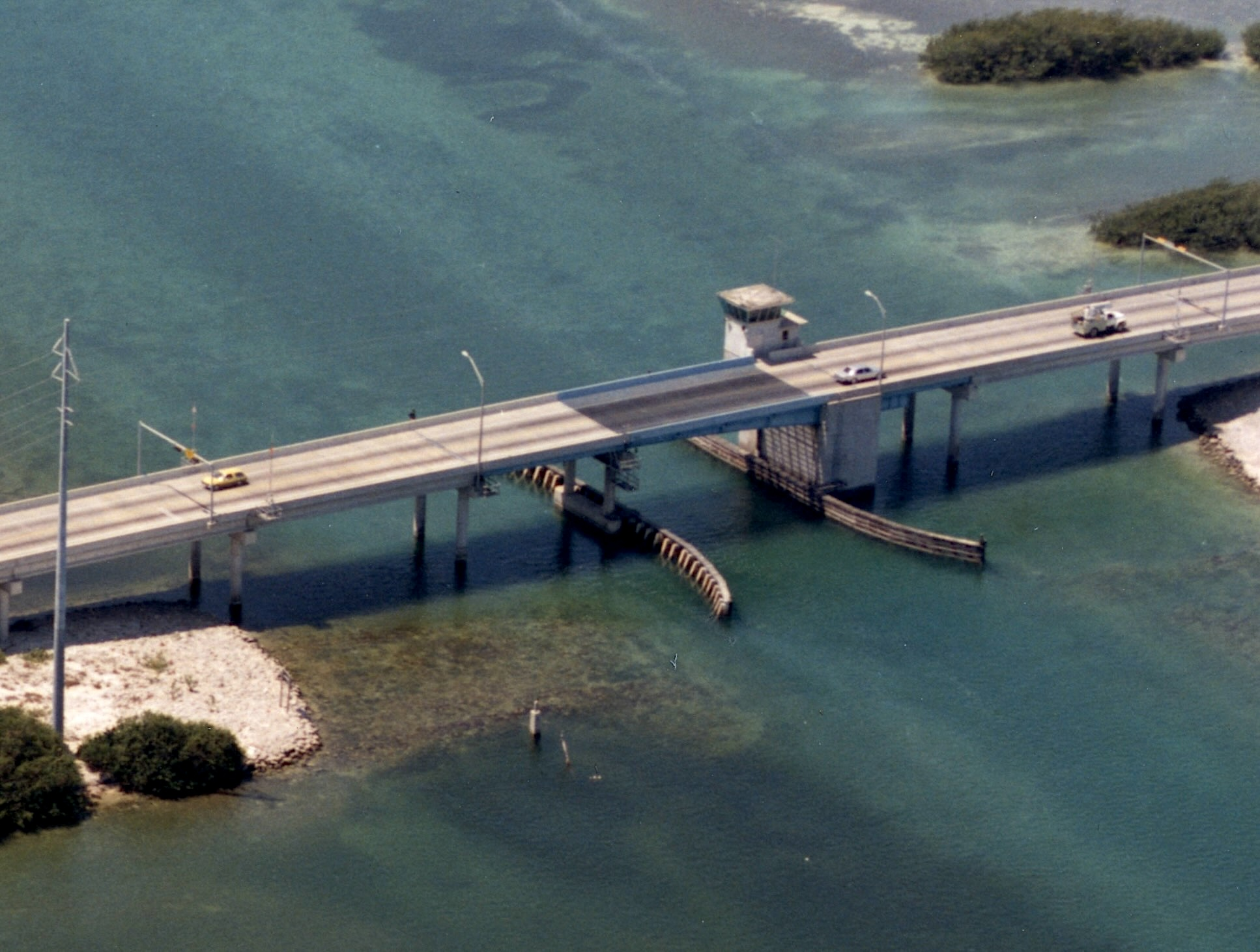
Snake Creek Bridge from the northeast

The current bridge is the fourth bridge that has existed at this location. The first bridge, which carried the Overseas Railroad, was built in the early 1900s. A second bridge built in the 1920s next to the railroad bridge carried the first Overseas Highway (State Road 4A), which paralleled the railroad on the south side. The railroad was abandoned in 1935 as a result of the Labor Day Hurricane. In the 1940s, the highway was rerouted onto the former railroad right of way and a new bridge was constructed. The fourth and current bridge was completed in 1981 when a number of new bridges were being built to modernize the Overseas Highway. The current bridge was the first at the site to be a drawbridge. All previous bridges were low-level fixed bridges. The drawbridge was included to provide an additional navigable channel between the keys.

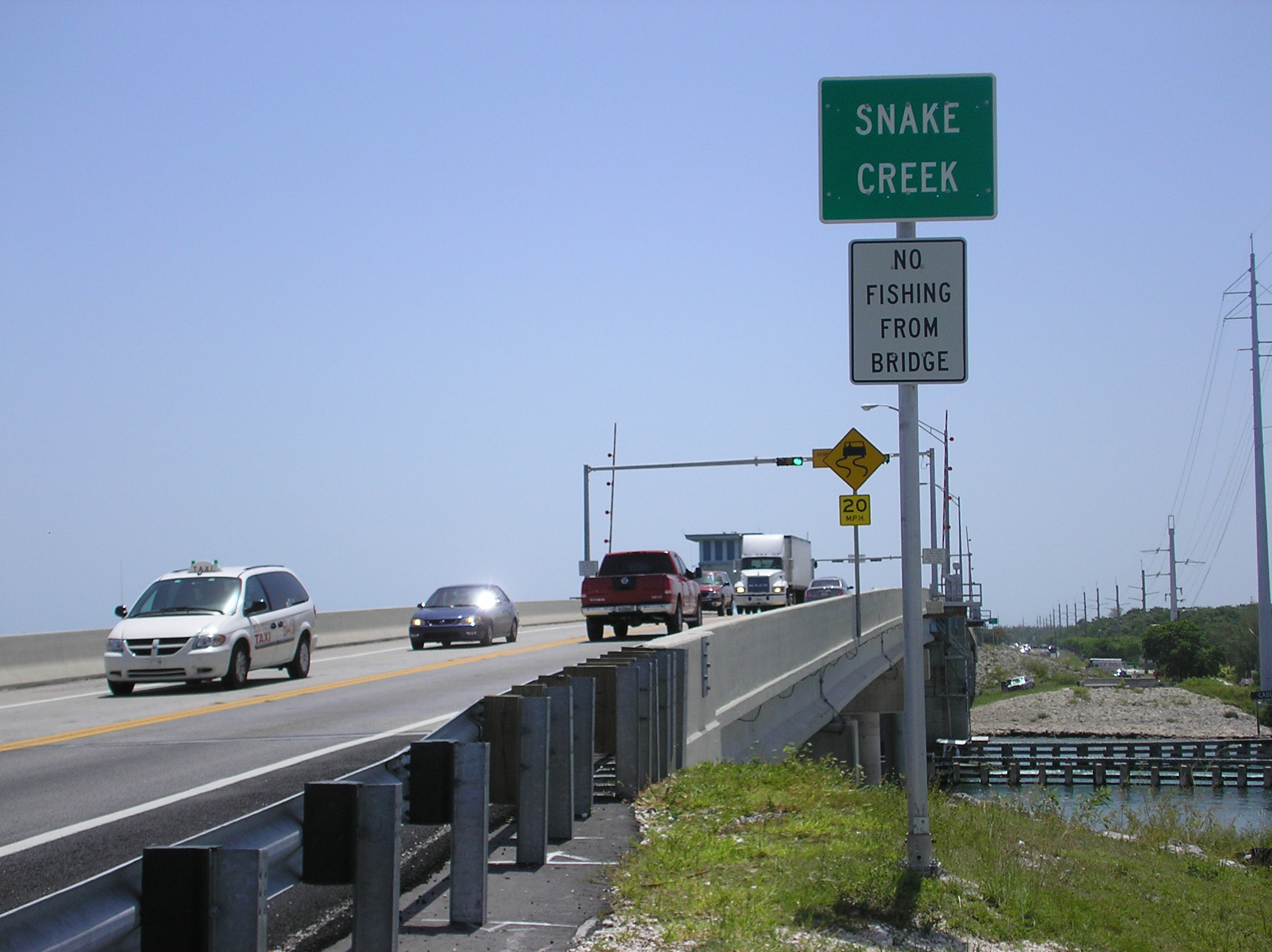
Snake Creek Bridge from the highway

The Snake Creek Bridge has been the only drawbridge operating in the Florida Keys since 2008. It gained this distinction when the original Jewfish Creek Bridge was replaced with its current high-span bridge, and the closure and abandonment of the Boot Key Harbor Bridge in Marathon. Drawbridges also previously existed on the Indian Key Bridge, Channel 5 Bridge (near Long Key), and the Seven Mile Bridge.

== Future ==
The Florida Department of Transportation is considering replacing the current Snake Creek Bridge with a high-level fixed-span bridge to alleviate traffic caused by the opening of the drawbridge. A feasibility study on a high-span bridge was completed in 2019.
