= San Felipe (shipwreck) =

Historic shipwreck near Florida, US

- U.S. National Register of Historic Places
- Location within Florida Location within the United States
- Location: Monroe County, Florida, USA
- Nearest city: Islamorada, Florida
- Coordinates: 24°50′45.66″N 80°42′51″W
- MPS: 1733 Spanish Plate Fleet Shipwrecks MPS
- NRHP reference No.: 94000794
- Added to NRHP: August 11, 1994

The San Felipe (also known as El Lerri, El Terri, or Tyrri) is a historic shipwreck near Islamorada, Florida, United States. It is located east of Lower Matecumbe Key and south of the wreck of the San Pedro. On August 11, 1994, it was added to the U.S. National Register of Historic Places.
