= LaBranche Fishing Camp =

- U.S. National Register of Historic Places
- Location: Islamorada, Florida
- NRHP reference No.: 97000404
- Added to NRHP: May 9, 1997

The LaBranche Fishing Camp (also known as Estes Fishing Camp) is a historic site in Islamorada, Florida, United States. On May 9, 1997, it was added to the U.S. National Register of Historic Places.

The former marina is located on Whale Harbor Channel, a waterway which separates Windley Key from Upper Matecumbe Key. Boats from the fish camp could easily access the Atlantic Ocean to the south or Florida Bay to the north. No public access is available. The marina business is closed, and the site now serves as dockage for patrol vessels from local marine law enforcement agencies, primarily the Florida Fish and Wildlife Conservation Commission. The former Estes Fish Camp is located on the north side of U.S. 1, across the highway from Holiday Isle Resort and Marina.
