= Lower Matecumbe Beach =

Neighborhood in Islamorada, Florida

Lower Matecumbe Beach is a neighborhood within the village of Islamorada in Monroe County, Florida, United States. It is located in the upper Florida Keys on the southwestern half of Lower Matecumbe Key.

== Geography ==
It is located at 24.85°N 80.735°W, its elevation 0 feet (0 m).
