= San José y Las Animas (shipwreck) =

- U.S. National Register of Historic Places
- Location within Florida Location within the United States
- Location: Monroe County, Florida, USA
- Nearest city: Plantation Key, Florida
- Coordinates: 24°56′55″N 80°29′20″W
- MPS: 1733 Spanish Plate Fleet Shipwrecks MPS
- NRHP reference No.: 75002123
- Added to NRHP: March 18, 1975

The San Jose Y Las Animas is a shipwreck with historical significance near Plantation Key, Florida, United States. It sank in a hurricane in 1733 and is located approximately 4 miles southeast of Plantation Key. On March 18, 1975, it was added to the U.S. National Register of Historic Places.

== History ==
The San Jose y Las Animas was a merchant ship built in England in 1728 for Spain. Being part of the 1733 fleet that consisted of four warships, and eighteen merchant ships. San Jose y Las Animas was a 327-ton merchant ship carrying twenty-six guns and captained by Cristobal Fernando Franco. Leaving the port of Cuba and heading back to Spain, the ship was hit by a hurricane On July 15, 1733, and sinking off the coast of Florida. All crew were accounted for.

== Location of the wreck ==
San Jose y Las Animas ran aground off Tavenier Key. The San Jose quickly filled with water as the crew was under the haul of the ship seeking shelter from the storm. The crew had abandoned the ship and made their way to shore on rafts. The San Jose sank in twenty-eight-foot waters making it hard for the crew to recover the items on the ship.

The San Jose was detected by treasure hunters in 1968, buried in the sand. The exact location was 24 degrees North 80 degrees 29.334 W. The treasure hunters used a magnetometer to find the 135' long ballast and roughly 40' wide. They Also found twenty-three cannons and two anchors that were scattered around 200' from the site.

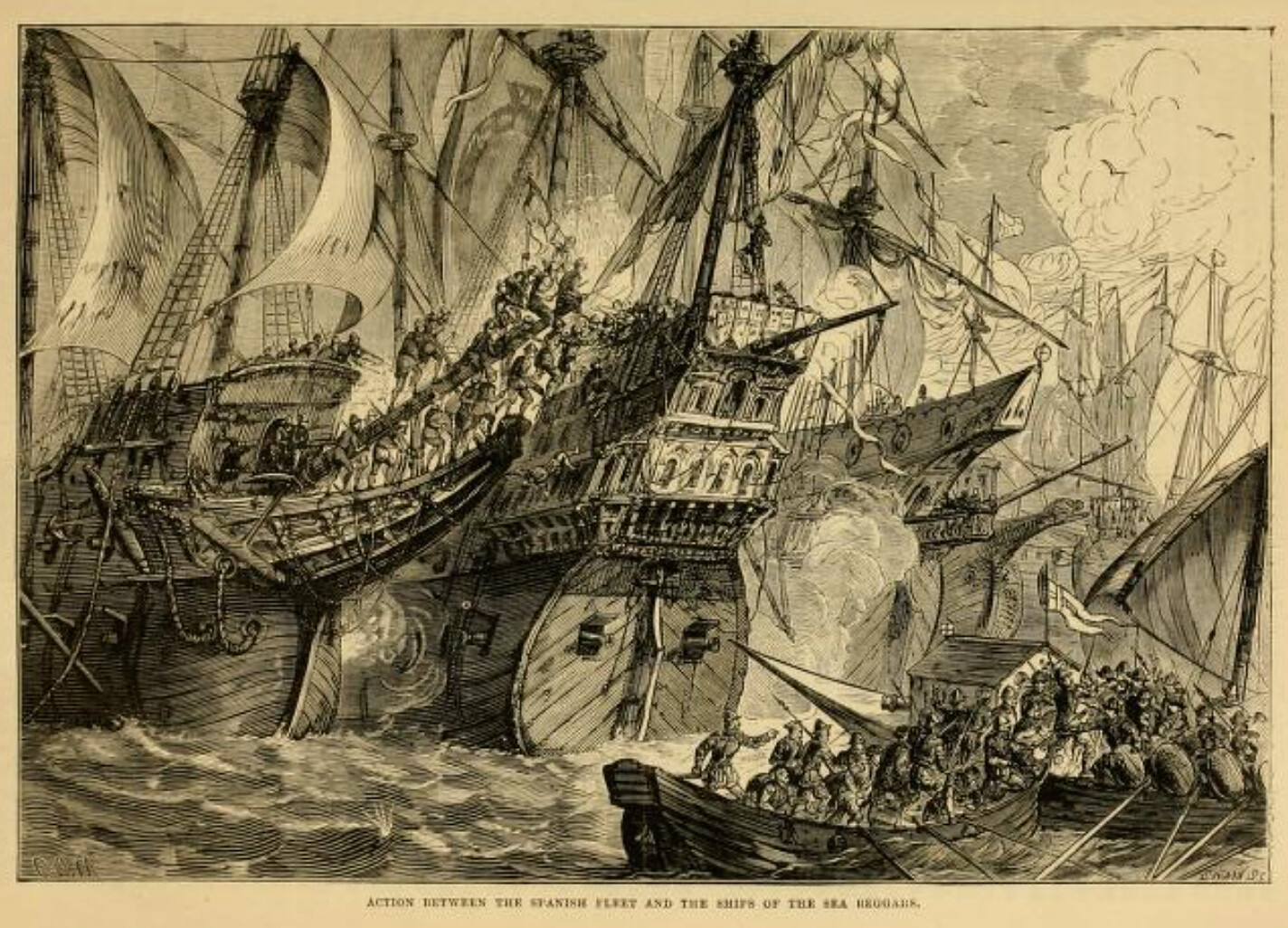
This is an example of a Spanish Galleon that the San Jose y las Animas would have looked like

== Recovery of items ==
The registered cargo of San Jose carried 30,435 pesos in silver and bullion, porcelain from China, brazilwood, cocoa, and vanilla. The wreck was found by treasure hunter Tom Gurr and backed by the Smithsonian under Mendel Peterson. They used 8-inch airlifts to bring the wreckage up from the sea. Because San Jose y Las Animas was within three miles of the coast, Florida wanted to enforce a 25 percent finder's fee on the treasure that Tom Gurr and his crew had found. Florida stated that the wreck was a historic site state in the Florida Constitution of 1865. The case went on for years until the court sided with the state. Gurr was ordered to return what he had recovered from the wreck. Tom Gurr stated that he threw back 50,000 to 100,000 dollars' worth of bullion back at the site of the wreck making the state of Florida press charges of grand larceny on Gurr since a percentage of the wreck was theirs. The state eventually found the coins that were still marked as registered by the state and the overseers of the project.

== Further resource ==
This is a link to a video of a news broadcast showing Gurr throwing the artifacts back into the ocean.
