= Fiesta Key =

Island in the upper Florida Keys, United States

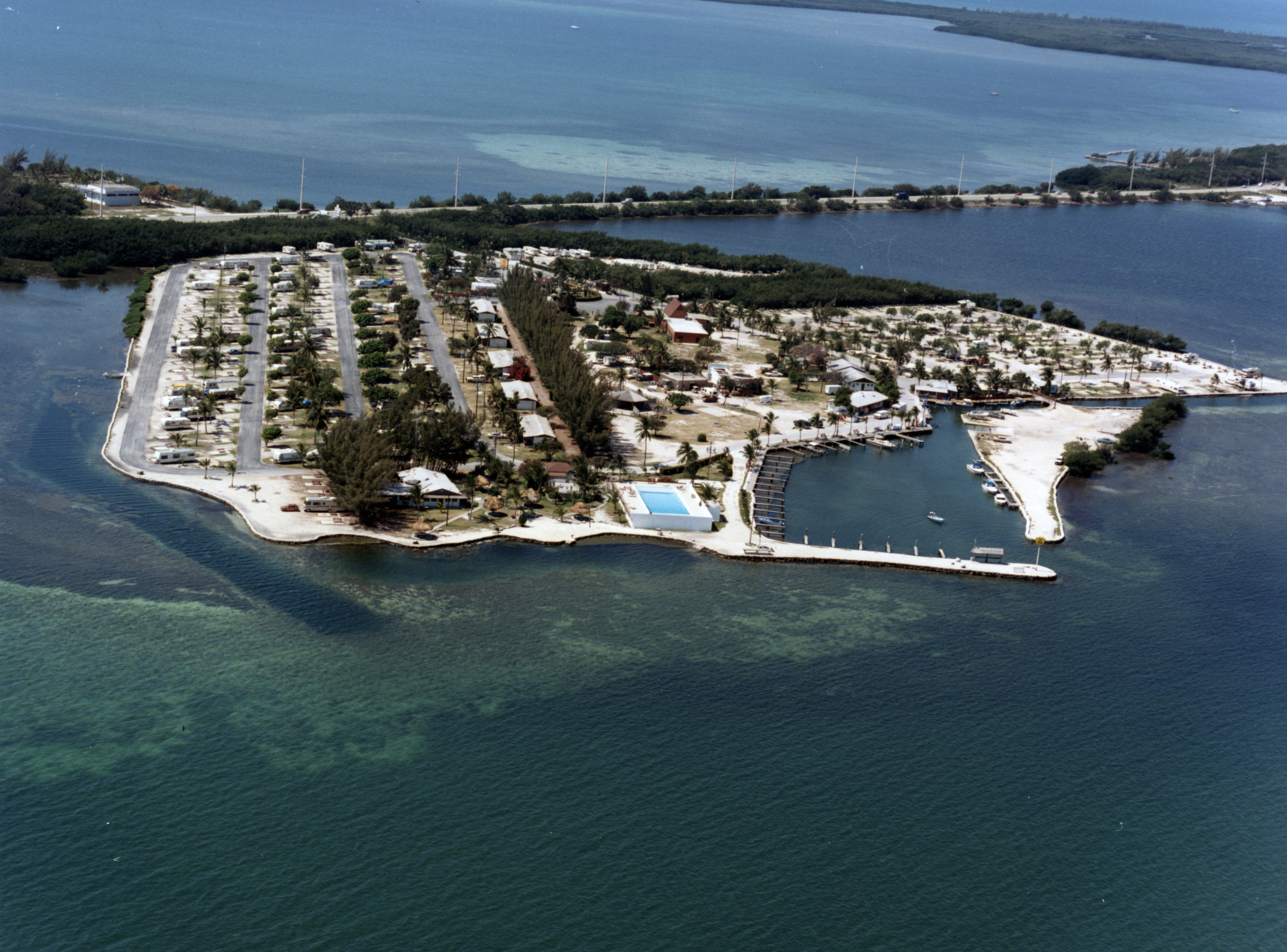
- Aerial view of Fiesta Key, October 1987

- Fiesta Key Fiesta Key (the Caribbean)

Geography
- Location: Gulf of Mexico
- Coordinates: 24.84086°N 80.789788°W

Administration
- United States
- State: Florida
- County: Monroe

Fiesta Key is the northeasternmost island in the middle Florida Keys, connected via causeway to U.S. 1 (or the Overseas Highway) at mile marker 70, between Long Key and Craig Key.

== History ==
Fiesta Key's earliest name on record was Jew-fish Kay. In an 1873 survey, Charles Smith, who came to the Keys to conduct government surveys of the islands, identified it as Jewfish Key.

Louie Turner homesteaded the island on January 7, 1908, becoming the first recorded owner.

For a period in the 1950s and 1960s, the island was a property of The Greyhound Corporation. During that period it was named Tropical Key, then Greyhound Key.

== Tourism and Camping ==
Kampgrounds of America (KOA) bought the island from Greyhound in 1966 and renamed it as Fiesta Key. KOA no longer owns the island.
