= San Pedro Underwater Archaeological Preserve State Park =

Underwater Archaeological Florida State Park

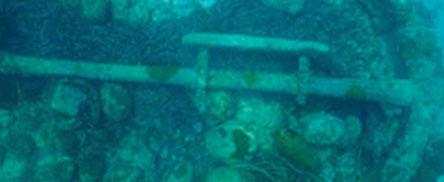
- A view of the shipwreck

- Location within Florida Location within the United States
- Interactive map of San Pedro Underwater Archaeological Preserve State Park
- Location: Monroe County, Florida, USA
- Nearest city: Islamorada, Florida
- Coordinates: 24°51′48″N 80°40′46″W
- Area: 15 acres (6.1 ha)
- San Pedro (Shipwreck)
- U.S. National Register of Historic Places
- Location: Monroe County, Florida, USA
- Nearest city: Islamorada, Florida
- NRHP reference No.: 01000530
- Added to NRHP: April 1, 1989

San Pedro Underwater Archaeological Preserve State Park is a Florida State Park located in 18 feet (5.5 m) of water, approximately 1.25 nautical miles (2.32 km) south of Indian Key. It became the second Florida Underwater Archaeological Preserve when it opened to the public in 1989. The heart of the park is the San Pedro, a submerged shipwreck from a 1733 Spanish flotilla, around which visitors can dive and snorkel. The San Pedro, a 287-ton Dutch-built vessel, and 21 other Spanish ships under the command of Rodrigo de Torres left Havana, Cuba, on Friday, July 13, 1733, bound for Spain. The San Pedro carried a cargo of 16,000 silver Mexican pesos and crates of Chinese porcelain. A hurricane struck the fleet, while entering the Straits of Florida, and sank or swamped most of the fleet. The wrecksite includes an "eighteenth century anchor, replica cannons, ballast stones encrusted with coral, a dedication plaque, and a mooring buoy system." The wreck was added to the U.S. National Register of Historic Places on May 31, 2001.

The wreck's ballast consists of stones collected from European riverbeds to help stabilize the vessel. Red bricks from the ship's galley remain mixed among the stones.

== 1733 Spanish fleet ==
The entire 1733 fleet, except for one ship, was lost in a hurricane off Florida. The lesser severity of the 1733 hurricane (which struck the fleet on July 15) and the shallowness of the wrecksites in the Keys, however, made for many survivors and even left four ships in good enough condition to be re-floated and sent back to Havana. A very successful salvage effort by the Spanish soon commenced, bringing up even more than the 12 million pesos of precious cargo on the Fleet's manifest (thanks to the usual contraband).

The wrecks themselves are spread across 80 miles, from north of Key Largo down to south of Duck Key, and include the following galleons (but note there is not universal agreement as to which wrecksite pertains to each galleon, and also note that each name is a contemporaneous abbreviation or nickname): El Pópulo, El Infante, San José, El Rubí (the capitana, or lead vessel of the fleet), Chávez, Herrera, Tres Puentes, San Pedro, El Terri (also spelled Lerri or Herri), San Francisco, El Gallo Indiano (the almiranta, or rear guard of the fleet), Las Angustias, El Sueco de Arizón, San Fernando, and San Ignacio. This last ship, San Ignacio, is believed to be the source of many silver coins (and even some gold coins) found in a reef area off Deer Key known as "Coffins Patch," the southwesternmost of all the 1733-Fleet wrecksites. In addition, many other related sites are known, mostly the wrecks of tag-along ships that accompanied the fleet proper.

The first and arguably most famous of the wrecks of the 1733 Fleet to be located in modern times was the Capitana El Rubí, which was discovered in 1948 and salvaged principally in the 1950s by Art McKee, whose Sunken Treasure Museum on Plantation Key housed his finds for all to see. Throughout the next several decades, however, the wrecksites in the Keys became a virtual free-for-all, with many disputes and confrontations, until the government created the Florida Keys National Marine Sanctuary in 1990. The removal of artifacts from any of the sites is prohibited today.

In contrast to the 1715 Fleet, and because of the extensive Spanish salvage in the 1730s, the finds by modern divers have been modest, especially in gold coins, of which there are far more fakes on the market than genuine specimens. Nevertheless, the 1733 Fleet has been a significant source for some of the rare Mexican milled "pillar dollars" of 1732–1733 as well as the transitional "klippe"-type coins of 1733.

== References and external links ==
- History of the 1733 Treasure Fleet. The Practical Book of Cobs 4th Ed. Sedwick
- San Pedro Underwater Archaeological Preserve State Park at Florida State Parks
- San Pedro Underwater Archaeological Preserve State Park at Absolutely Florida
- The San Pedro Florida Keys National Marine Sanctuary
- Monroe County listings at National Register of Historic Places
- Monroe County listings at Florida's Office of Cultural and Historical Programs
- San Pedro at Florida's Underwater Archaeological Preserves
- San Pedro at Florida's Shipwrecks - 300 Years of Maritime History
- San Pedro Underwater Archaeological Preserve at Indiana University
- “The Spanish Treasure Fleets of 1715 and 1733: Disasters Strike at Sea”, a National Park Service Teaching with Historic Places (TwHP) lesson plan
- Museums in the Sea San Pedro
