= Windley Key Fossil Reef Geological State Park =

State park in Florida, United States

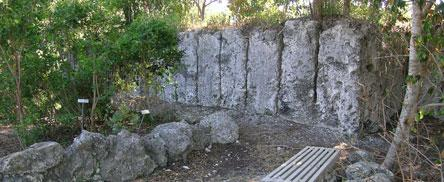

- Location within Florida Location within the United States
- Interactive map of Windley Key Fossil Reef Geological State Park
- Location: Monroe County, Florida, United States
- Nearest city: Islamorada, Florida
- Coordinates: 24°56′57″N 80°35′46″W
- Established: 1999
- Governing body: Florida Department of Environmental Protection

Windley Key Fossil Reef Geological State Park is a Florida State Park located at mile marker 85.5 on US 1 near Islamorada. It was a former quarry used by Henry Flagler in the early 1900s to help his building of the Overseas Railroad. Following the railroad's completion, it was a source of decorative stone pieces called Keystone. Now on display are exposed sections of fossilized coral and some of the original quarry machinery. The Hurricane Monument at Mile Marker 82 in Islamorada is constructed of Keystone from the quarry. The Florida Geological Survey named it a State Geological Site in 1998.

== Geology ==
The quarry exposes Key Largo Limestone containing fossil corals, mollusks, and bryozoans. Layers of red soil, known as terra rossa, occur within some quarry walls and contain windblown African dust left behind as rainwater dissolved the surrounding limestone.

== Hours ==
Florida state parks are open between 8 a.m. and sundown every day of the year (including holidays). The visitor center is open between Thursday and Monday from 8:00 am to 5:00 pm.

== Gallery ==
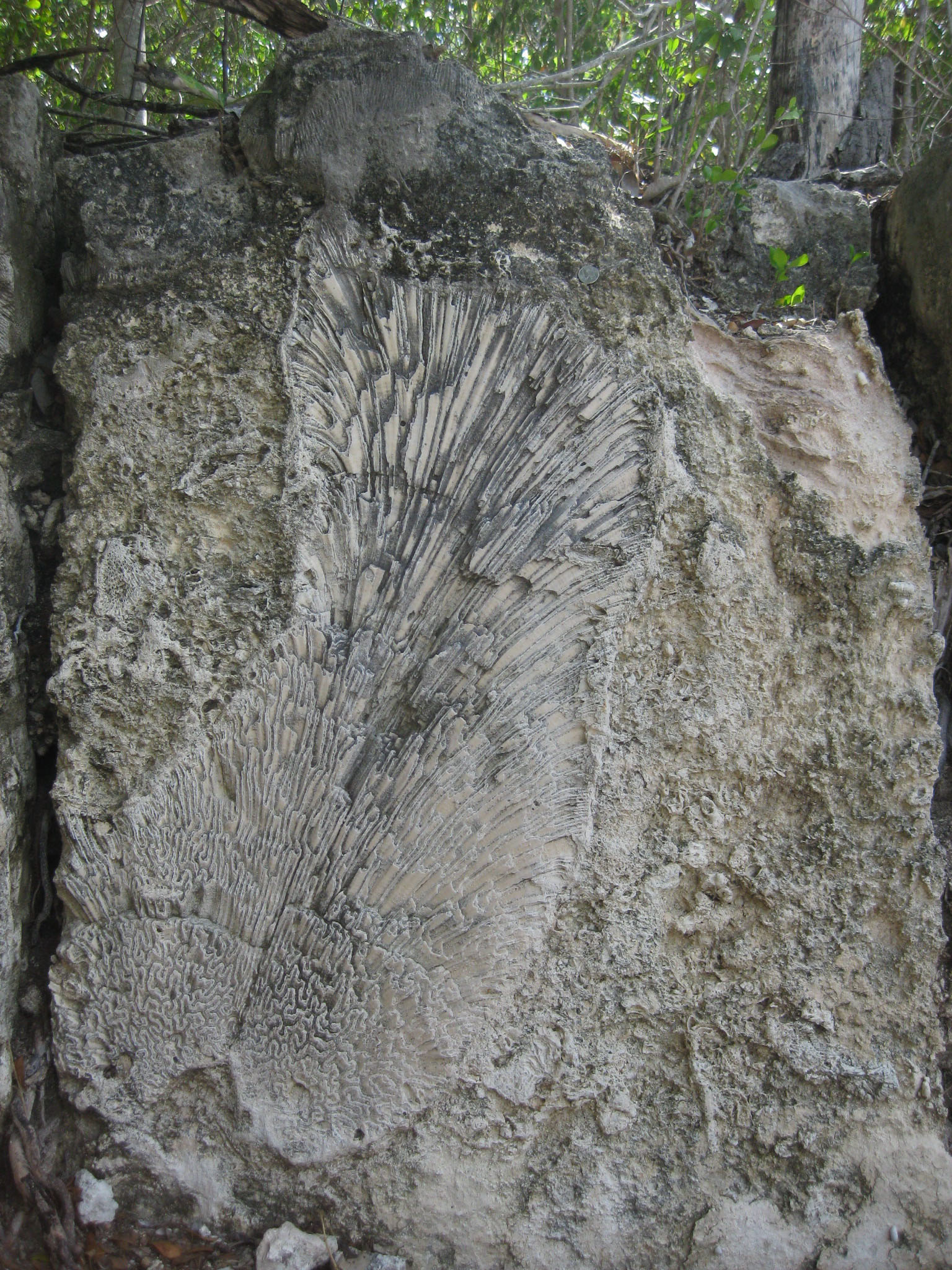
Example of fossil Brain coral (Diploria) at the park. US Quarter near top for scale.
