= Palm Beach Farms, Florida =

Unincorporated community in Florida, U.S.

Royal Palm Estates (formerly West Palm Beach Farms) is an unincorporated community in Palm Beach County, Florida, United States. The population is unknown, however. This town is similar to Southwest Ranches because of its semi-rural landscape. The property sizes are mostly an acre large. Major highways throughout the community are SR 80/US 98, Florida's Turnpike, Jog Road, and US 441/SR 7.

== Geography ==
Palm Beach Farms is located at 26°39′58″N 80°11′45″W. It is located in the middle of the West Palm Beach area.

- To the north: Lake Belvedere Estates/Golden Lakes
- To the west: Wellington
- To the south: Greenacres
- To the east: Gun Club Estates
