= Upper Matecumbe Key =

Island in the upper Florida Keys, United States

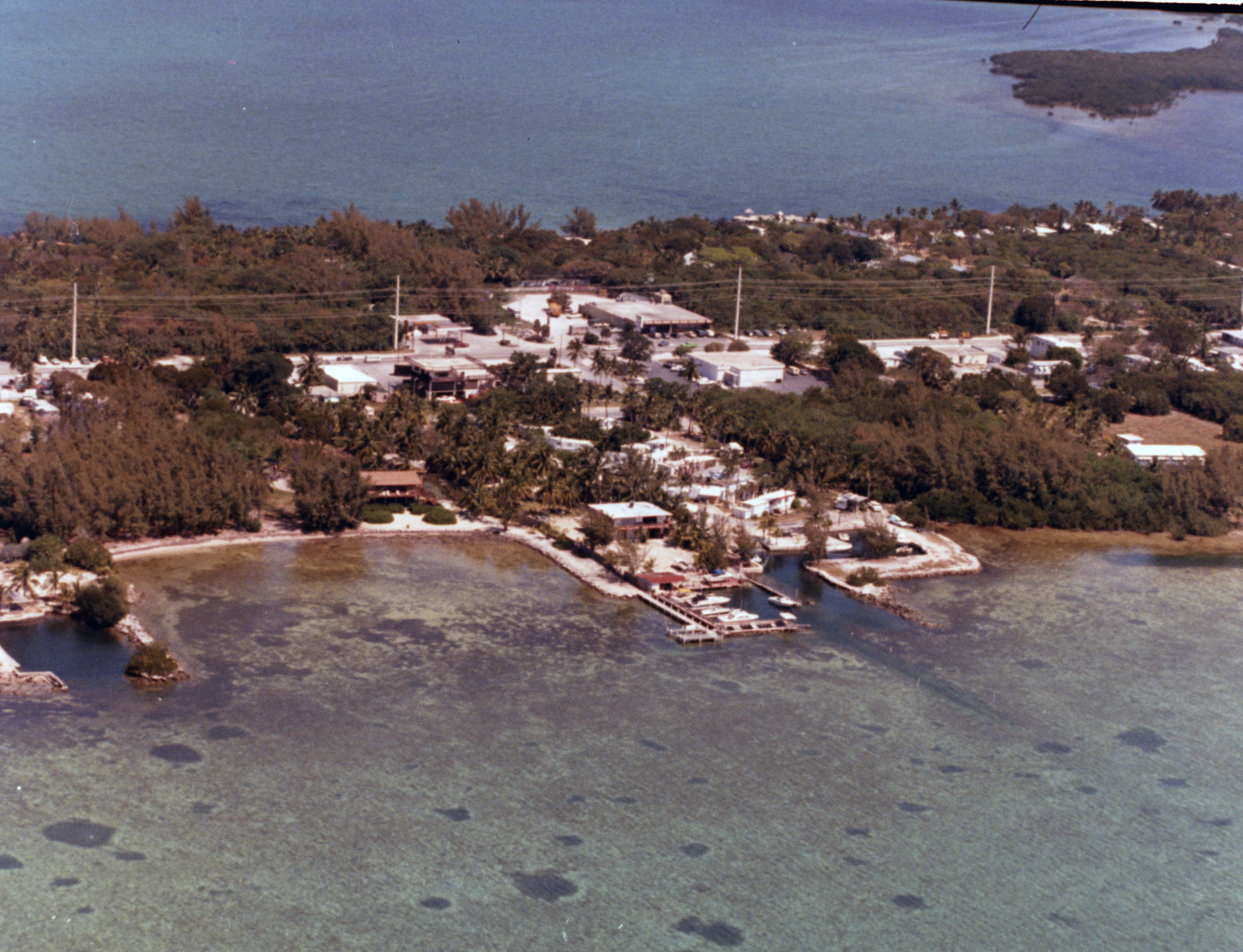
- Aerial view of Post Office on Upper Matecumbe Key, October 1987

- Upper Matecumbe Key Upper Matecumbe Key (the Caribbean)

Geography
- Location: Gulf of Mexico
- Coordinates: 24.918°N 80.635°W

Administration
- United States
- State: Florida
- County: Monroe

Upper Matecumbe Key is an island in the upper Florida Keys.

U.S. 1 (or the Overseas Highway) crosses the key at approximately mile markers 79–83.5, between Windley Key and Lower Matecumbe Key.

All of the key is within the Village of Islamorada as of November 4, 1997, when it was incorporated.

The island lies to the southwest of Windley Key and to the northeast of Lower Matecumbe Key.

The history of the names of both this key and Lower Matecumbe Key are very confusing, as identical names have been used at different times to designate both keys. Upper Matecumbe Key is the original settlement site of Islamorada. There are several Indian mounds and habitation sites located here.

== Education ==
It is in the Monroe County School District. It is zoned to Plantation Key Elementary School (K-8) in Plantation Key.
