= George Adderley House =

Historic house in Florida, United States

- U.S. National Register of Historic Places
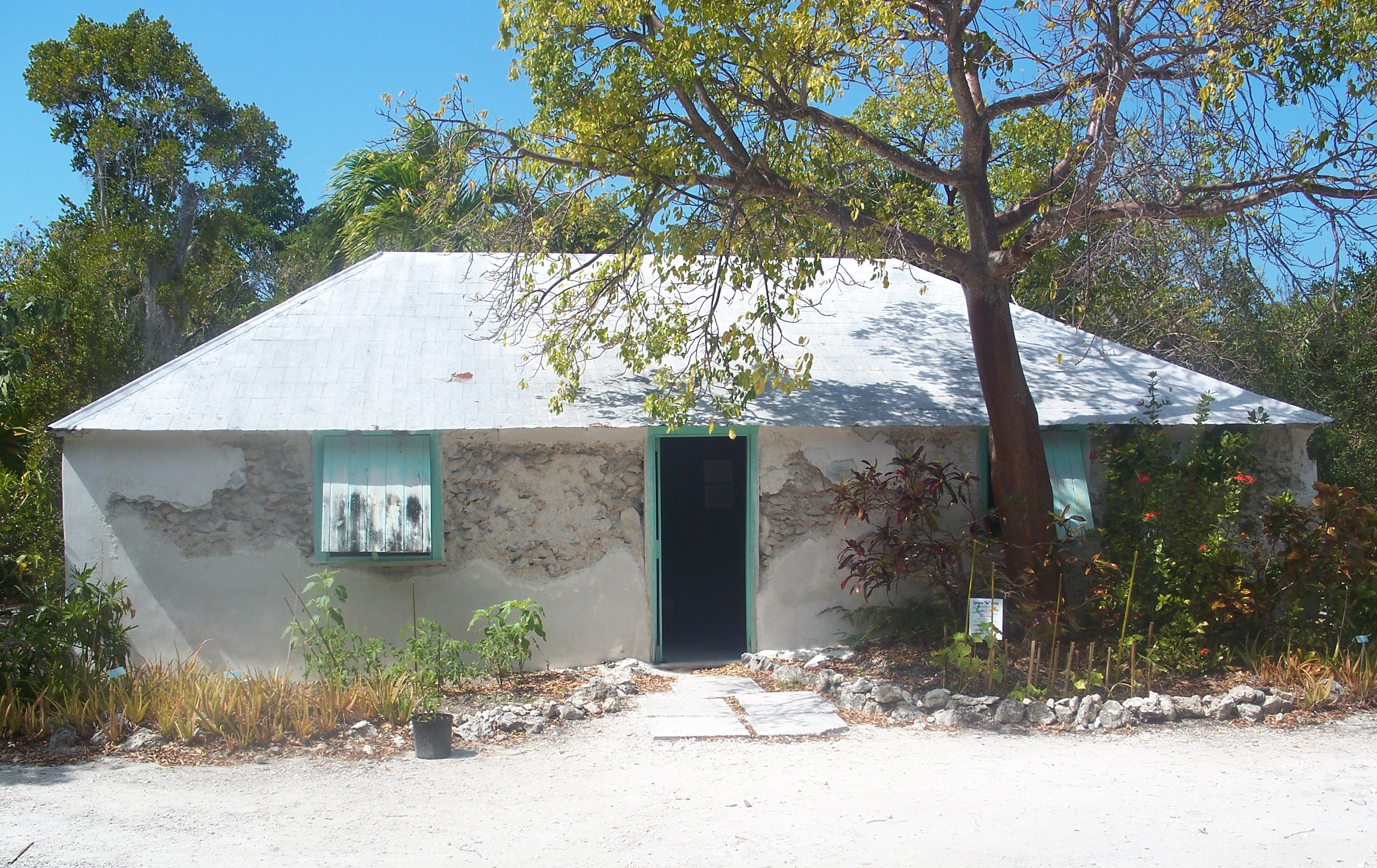

- Location within Florida Location within the United States
- Interactive map showing the location of George Adderley House
- Location: 5550 Overseas Hwy, Marathon, Florida
- Coordinates: 24°43′11″N 81°4′31″W
- Area: 5.0 acres (2.0 ha)
- Built: 1906
- Architect: George Adderley
- Architectural style: Masonry Vernacular
- NRHP reference No.: 92001243
- Added to NRHP: September 10, 1992

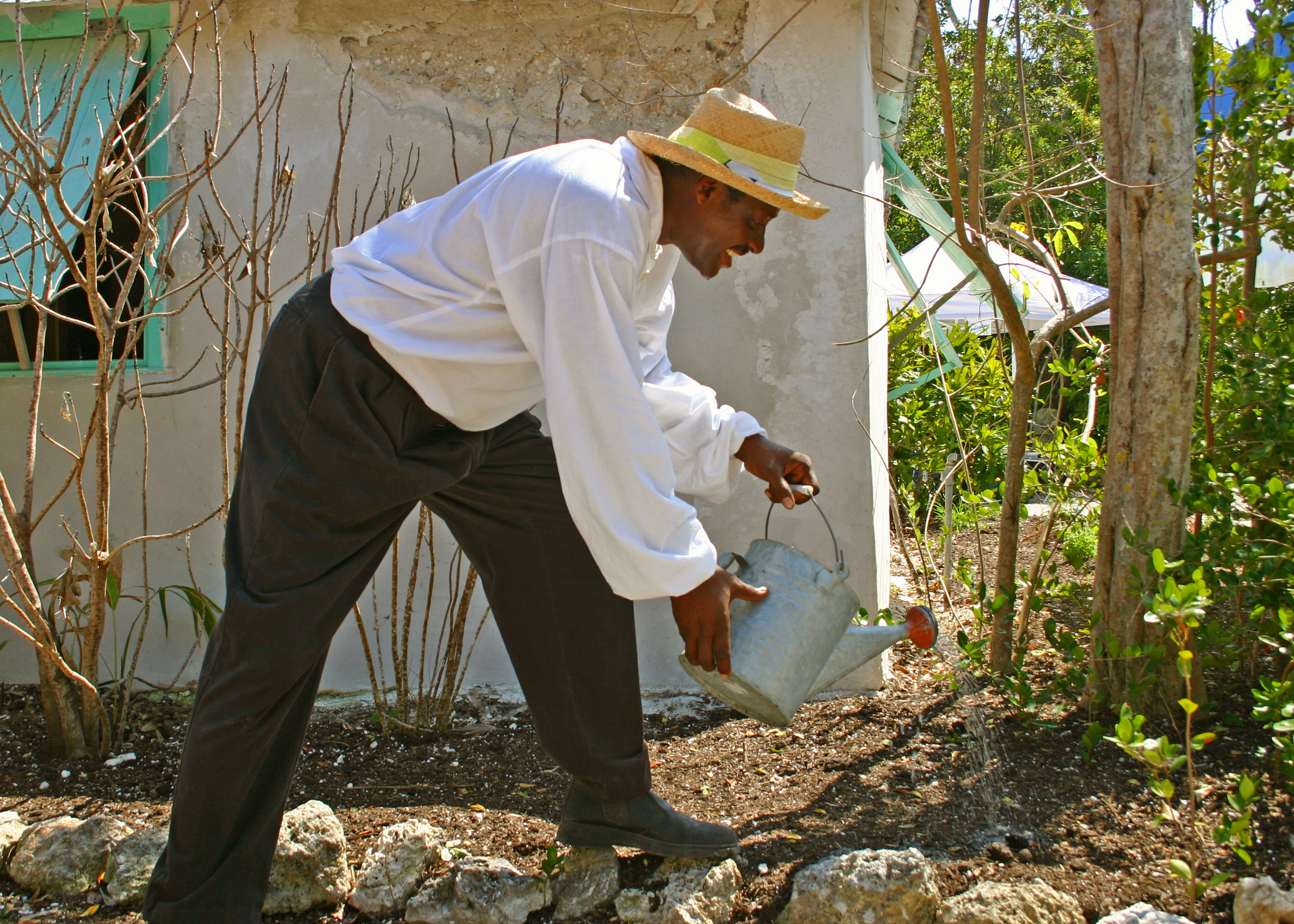
Historical reenactor at Crane Point's Bahamian Heritage Festival 2006

The George Adderley House (also known as the Bahamian House) is a historic home in the City of Marathon, Florida, United States. It is located at 5550 Overseas Highway. On September 10, 1992, it was added to the U.S. National Register of Historic Places. The house is the oldest house in the Keys outside of Key West and the only surviving tabby house in the Keys.

Adderley was a black immigrant from the Bahamas. He came to the Key Largo, Florida in 1890 and by 1891 was a naturalized citizen of the United States. He and his wife Olivia got a $100 mortgage and bought the 32 acre property in 1901. He collected sponges and made charcoal which he took by sailboat to Key West to sell to buy provisions he and Olivia could not make themselves.

The house was built from 1903 to 1905. The house is made of tabby, a homemade concrete like mixture of burnt shell, ashes, sand, shell and water. When the railroad came through in 1912 George negotiated a flag stop with the railway in exchange for a right of way across his land. Olivia died in 1948 at age 86. George lived on the property one more year until he sold the property to the Crane family in 1949. George moved to a home for the blind in Key West where he lived until his death in 1959, at the age of 88.

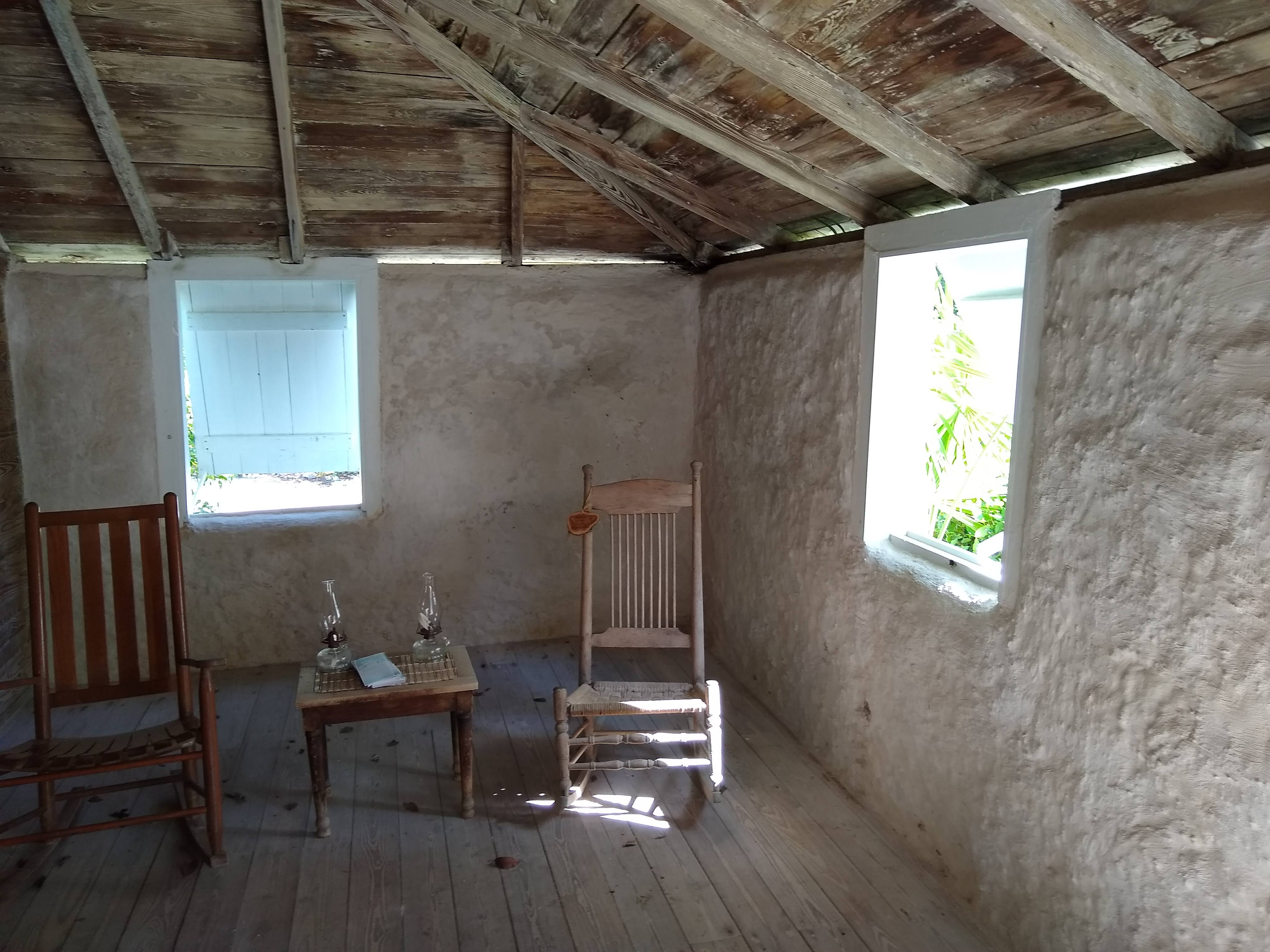
George Adderley House Interior

A small community, called Adderley Town, of 6 to 10 households developed around the Adderleys as he was an Episcopal lay preacher and held services in his home..[2] While the Adderley House and a small outbuilding nearby are all that remain of Adderley Town, the site has been excavated and some of the tools and utensils probably used by him, his family and their community are on display in the nearby Museum of Natural History of the Florida Keys.

Located at Crane Point Museum & Nature Center, visitors may walk through the house as part of the admission fee to the non-profit nature center. Every January, Crane Point hosts a Bahamian Heritage Festival which celebrates the Bahamian heritage in the Florida Keys
