= Crane Point =

Museum and nature center with some of the best kayaking in Florida

Crane Point Museum and Nature Center
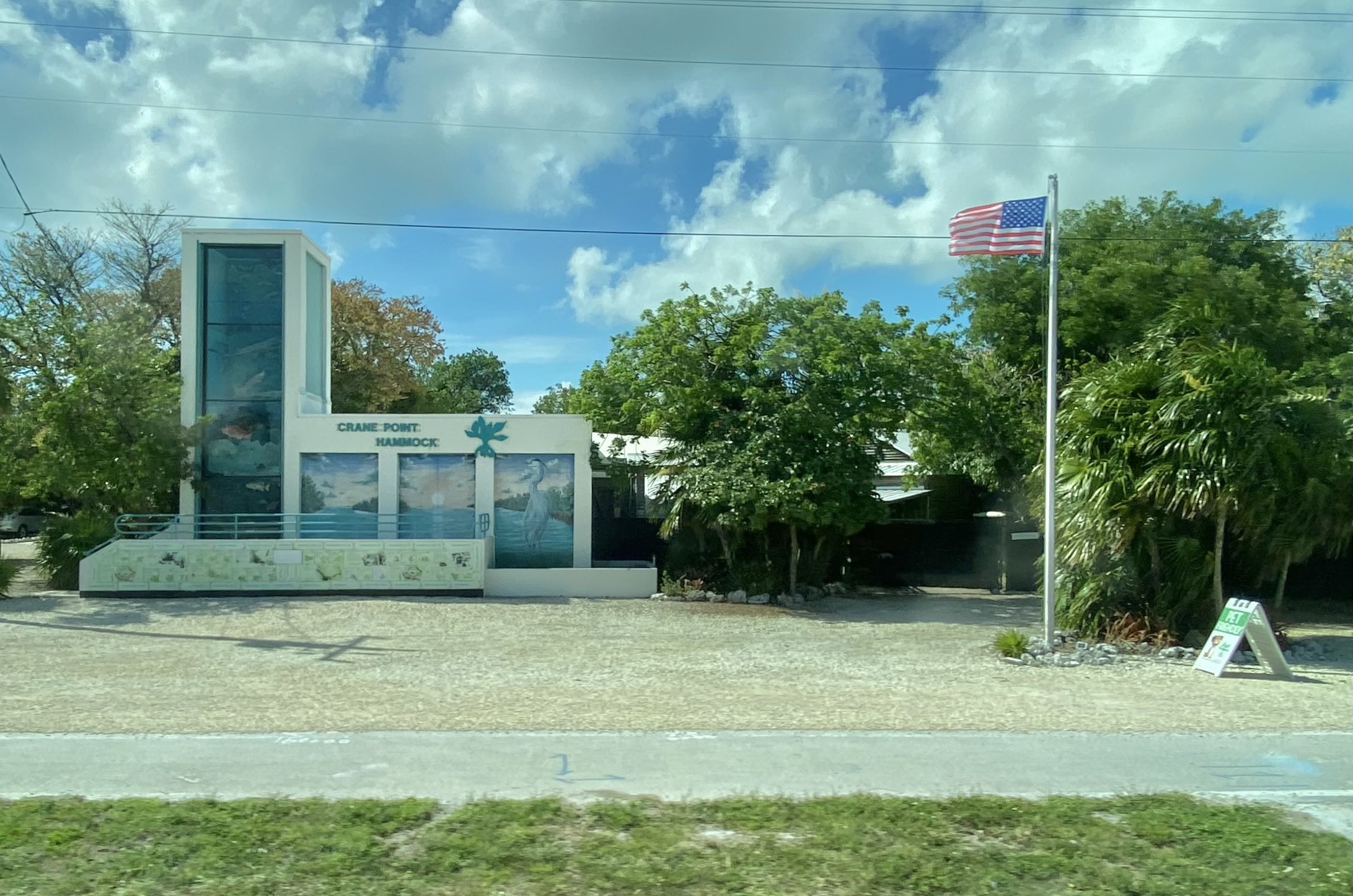
- Crane Point Hammock entrance, photographed by Sharon Hahn Darlin
- Former name: Tropical Crane Point Hammock
- Established: 1976
- Location: 5550 Overseas Highway, Marathon, Florida
- Type: natural history, children's museum
- CEO: Charlotte Quinn
- Parking: paid self-parking or valet parking
- Website: cranepoint.net
- 2021

Crane Point Museum and Nature Center is a nonprofit natural history museum and nature center located in the City of Marathon on Key Vaca, in the heart of the Florida Keys in Monroe County, Florida, United States. The museum sits on a 63-acre parcel of woodland, known as the Tropical Crane Point Hammock. The stand of hardwoods is a hammock which forms an ecological island.

The facility was listed on the National Register of Historic Places in 2021. The organization's CEO is Charlotte Quinn.

== Features ==
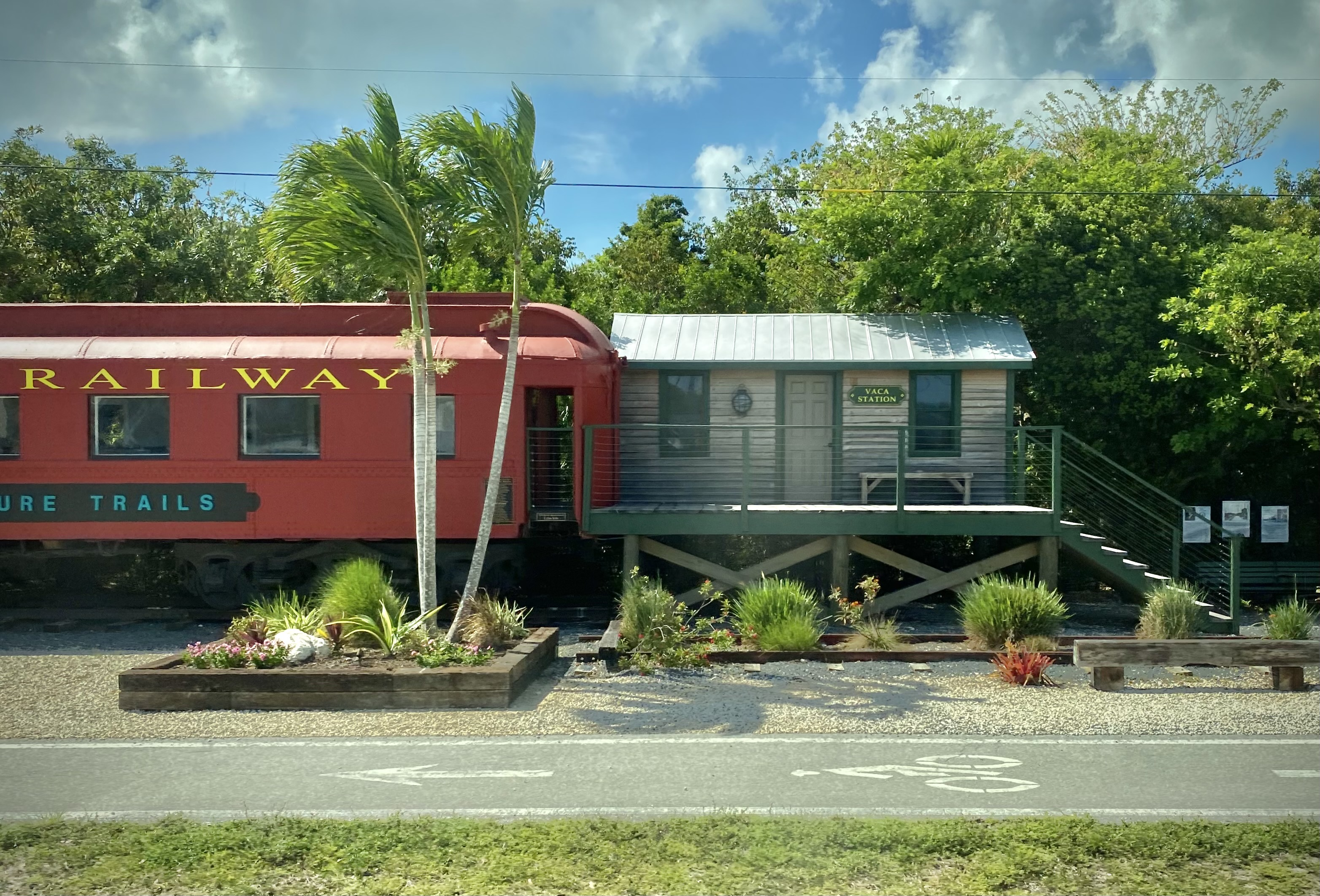
Old Vaca train station at the Crane Point Museum

Crane Point features several facilities:

- Museum of Natural History of the Florida Keys, exhibits focus on the natural and cultural history of the Keys area, including Calusa Indians, Spanish explorers and other Keys pioneers, pirates, a diorama of a coral reef, butterflies, tree snails, sea turtles, shells, Key deer and local tropical fish. The museum was established in 1990. The museum is part of the Smithsonian Traveling Exhibit, from the Smithsonian Institution's National Museum of Natural History, which contains depictions of Keys heritage and landscapes.
- Florida Keys Children's Museum, features two saltwater lagoons and many marine touch tanks that contain native Keys invertebrates and fish, including a nurse shark, as well as an interactive pirate play area.

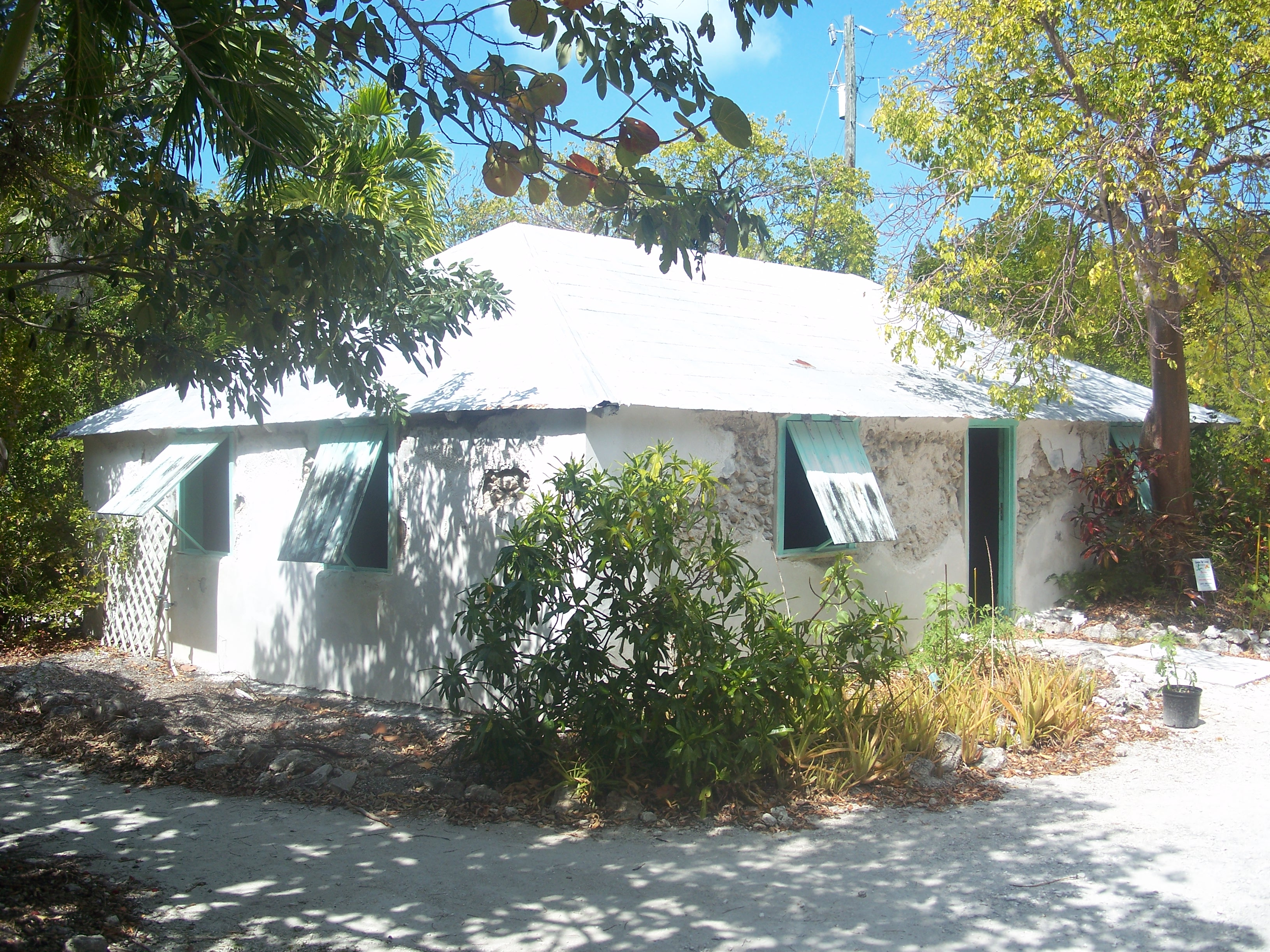
George Adderly House, built in 1903

- George Adderley House, a historic house museum that was built by George Adderley, a Bahamian pioneer, in 1903 that still stands on Crane Point's property. The exterior of the house was constructed with Tabby, a concrete-like material made of burned conch and other shells and sand.
- Marathon Wild Bird Center, a rehabilitation center for injured and orphaned wild birds. Opened in 1998, the center also offers education programs and research projects. Some recovering birds can be viewed in the outdoor flight cage.
- Nature trails

== History ==
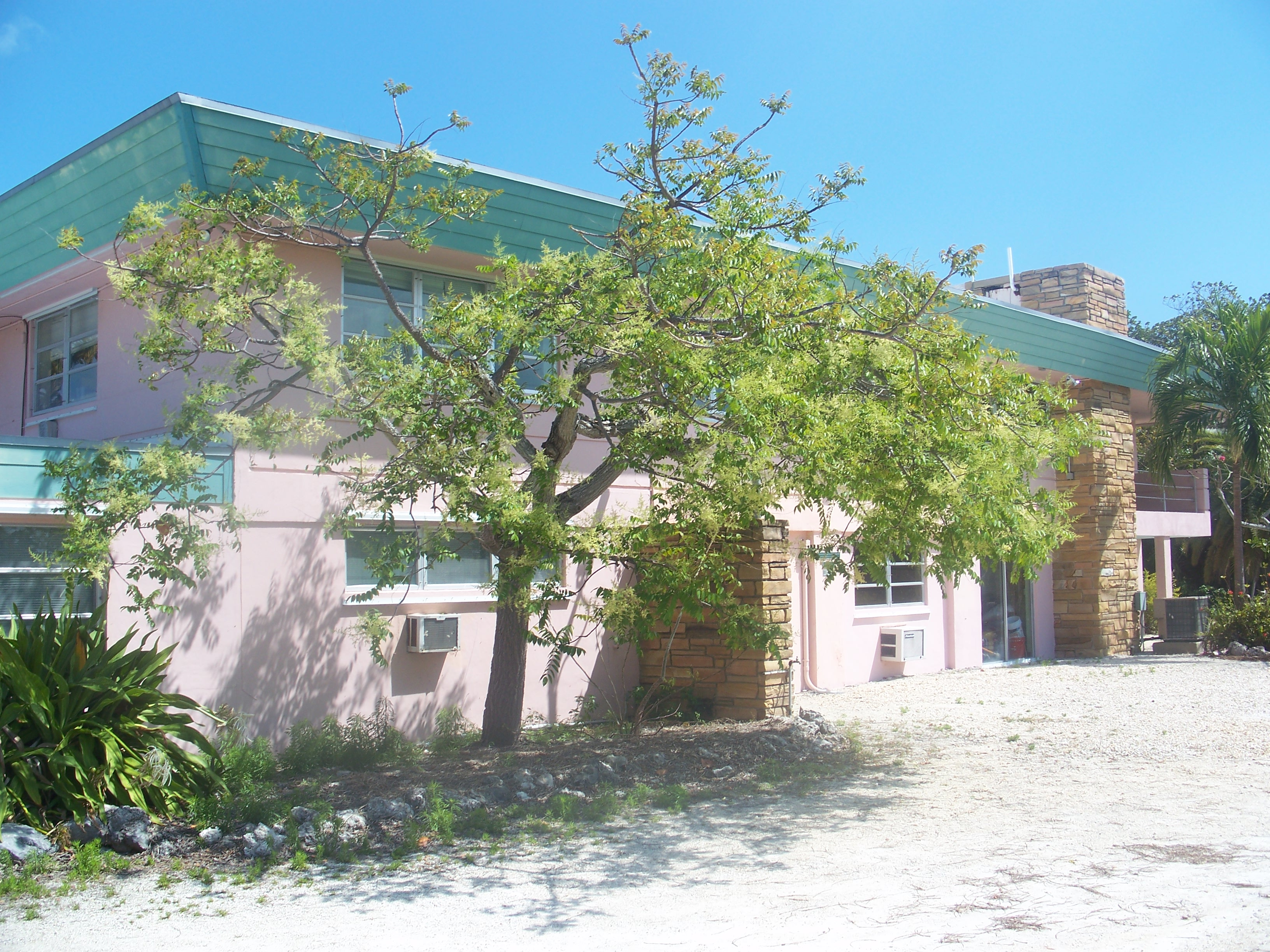
Crane House

Francis and Mary Crane purchased the land in 1949 and built Crane House in 1954.

In 1976, local citizens formed the Florida Keys Land Trust to preserve the hardwood hammock. The trust incorporated as a nonprofit in 1978, purchased the land, and saved the area from being developed into private homes and shopping malls. The trust changed its name to Florida Keys Land and Sea Trust.

Crane Point was formerly known as Tropical Crane Point Hammock.

The Crane Point Museum and Nature Center and Adderley House are both part of the National Register of Historic Places.

== External links and references ==
- Official site
- Marathon Wild Bird Center
