= Pennichaw, Florida =

Pennichaw
- Unincorporated community
- Location within Volusia County
- Coordinates: 28°47′56″N 81°00′20″W
- Country: United States
- State: Florida
- County: Volusia
- Elevation: 16 ft (5 m)
- Time zone: UTC-5 (Eastern (EST))
  - Summer (DST): UTC-4 (EDT)
- enter ZIP code: 32764
- Area code: 386
- GNIS feature ID: 294885

Pennichaw is a rural unincorporated community located in south Volusia County, Florida, United States. It located on Lake Harney Road, approximately 1.8 miles south of Maytown Road.

== History ==
Pennichaw was one of several small settlements along the Kissimmee Valley Branch of the Florida East Coast Railway.

The first railroad to penetrate the virgin timberland east of the St. Johns River was the Atlantic Coast, St. Johns & Indian River Railway. Built from a connection with the Plant System near the steamboat landing in the village of Enterprise, southeasterly through Osteen and Maytown, eventually reaching the coastal town of Titusville in 1885. As railroad magnate Henry Flagler pushed his lines southward along the east coast he was obliged to absorb the A.C.ST.J & I R. making it a part of a network which became the Florida East Coast Railway.

The years 1911-1929 saw the Florida East Coast Railway building what was advertised as a second complete mainline to Miami. Known as the Kissimmee Valley Branch and heading southwest from the busy railroad town of New Smyrna Beach, the new route passed through Maytown-PENNICHAW-Osceola-Geneva and was completed to Chuluota in 1912. The Chuluota-Bithlo-Holopaw-Okeechobee segment was completed in 1915. Finally wrapping around the big lake it terminated at Lake Harbor in 1929. Though it never achieved the status of 'a complete second mainline,' it did post some impressive freight tonnage records.

The name Pennichaw comes from a Seminole word meaning "turkey gobbler". At its peak, Pennichaw had a turpentine still and commissary.

The railroad through Pennichaw ceased operation in 1947 when a new cut-off opened between Fort Pierce and Port Mayaca. However, before it would be abandoned, the Peavy Wilson Lumber Company, operating a massive mill in Holopaw, leased the Holopaw-Pennichaw-Maytown trackage. So trains continued to roll through the little settlement until the lumber company quit in 1951. Tracks through Pennichaw were removed fairly quickly and the balance of the Maytown area trackage was abandoned in 1974. As the railroads and the commerce they brought disappeared, small communities such as Pennichaw declined. A few residential properties remain in the vicinity of Pennichaw.

== Rails-to-Trails ==
The state of Florida has purchased the right of way that was formerly used for the New Smyrna (Edgewater)-Maytown and Benson Junction-Titusville segments of the nearby abandoned rail lines and partnered with Volusia County to construct a paved, multi-use trail from Lake Monroe to both Edgewater and Titusville.

The East Central Regional Rail Trail corridor, which is more than 50 miles long, is managed by Volusia and Brevard counties. The first 5.7 miles opened in early 2011. None of the new trails utilize the old route through Pennichaw.
