= Craig Key =

Island in the upper Florida Keys, United States

- Craig Key Craig Key (the Caribbean)

Geography
- Location: Gulf of Mexico
- Coordinates: 24.8379°N 80.7595°W

Administration
- United States
- State: Florida
- County: Monroe

Craig Key is an island city in the middle Florida Keys.

U.S. 1 (or the Overseas Highway) crosses the key at approximately mile marker 72, between Lower Matecumbe Key and Fiesta Key.

== History ==
Craig Key was originally named Camp Panama, and was not a natural island, but a wide spot on the Overseas Railroad right-of-way. It was originally a vacation spot and flag stop on the railroad. Roland W. Craig leased the island from the railroad in the early 1930s, and by 1935 the island had been named Craig, Florida. Former president Herbert Hoover sailed his yacht out of Craig at times in the 1930s. The island's greatest claim to fame, however, is being the landfall site of the 1935 Labor Day Hurricane. Captain Ivar Olsen, who had been taking refuge from the storm in his dry-docked boat near the island, recorded a barometer measurement of 26.35 inches of mercury (892 mbar), the lowest sea-level atmospheric pressure ever recorded on land. The town was a total loss, but was rebuilt, and prospered as a vacation spot after the storm.

Originally a single island, two more man-made Keys were added, one to the southwest in 1955, and one to the northeast some time later. The name of the town was officially changed to "Craig Key" in 1971.
