= Plantation Key Colony =

Plantation Key Colony is a neighborhood located in the upper Florida Keys on the island of Plantation Key. Its name is in reference to the pineapple plantation originally in the area. All homes and real estate located on Plantation Key, just South of the Tavernier bridge and North of the Snake Creek bridge, are officially part of the Village of Islamorada, pay Village taxes and are provided services from the Village of Islamorada even through some homes on the Northern edge of the Key still maintain Tavernier zip codes.

== Geography ==
It is located at 24.997°N 80.541°W, its elevation 7 feet (2.1 m).
