= Windley Key =

Island in the upper Florida Keys, United States

- The sign at the front entrance to Windley Key Fossil Reef Geological State Park

- Windley Key Windley Key (the Caribbean)

Geography
- Location: Gulf of Mexico
- Coordinates: 24.9500°N 80.5978°W

Administration
- United States
- State: Florida
- County: Monroe

Windley Key is an island in the upper Florida Keys in Monroe County, Florida, United States. U.S. 1 (the Overseas Highway) crosses it at approximately mile markers 84–85.5, between Plantation Key and Upper Matecumbe Key. All of the key is within the Village of Islamorada as of November 4, 1997, when it was incorporated.

The key is home to Theater of the Sea, a popular tourist attraction since 1946. It also contains a Florida State Park Service geological site, and the popular Holiday Isle resort.

== History ==
Prior to the building of the Overseas Railroad, the site consisted of two separate islands known as the Umbrella Keys. Railway construction required the intervening space to be filled; it then became known as Windley Key, after an early settler. Several quarries operated there for many years, supplying building stone locally known as "keystone". The railway station on Windley Key was called Quarry. The island was badly damaged during the 1935 Labor Day Hurricane.
