= Plantation Key, Florida =

Coordinates: 24°59′05″N 80°33′39″W

Plantation Key, Florida is a former census-designated place on Plantation Key in the Florida Keys, in Monroe County, Florida, United States. It is located just South of the Tavernier bridge and North of the Snake Creek bridge and was reported to have a population of 4,405 in 1990. It became part of the Village of Islamorada when the latter incorporated in 1997.
