= Plantation Key =

Island in the upper Florida Keys, United States

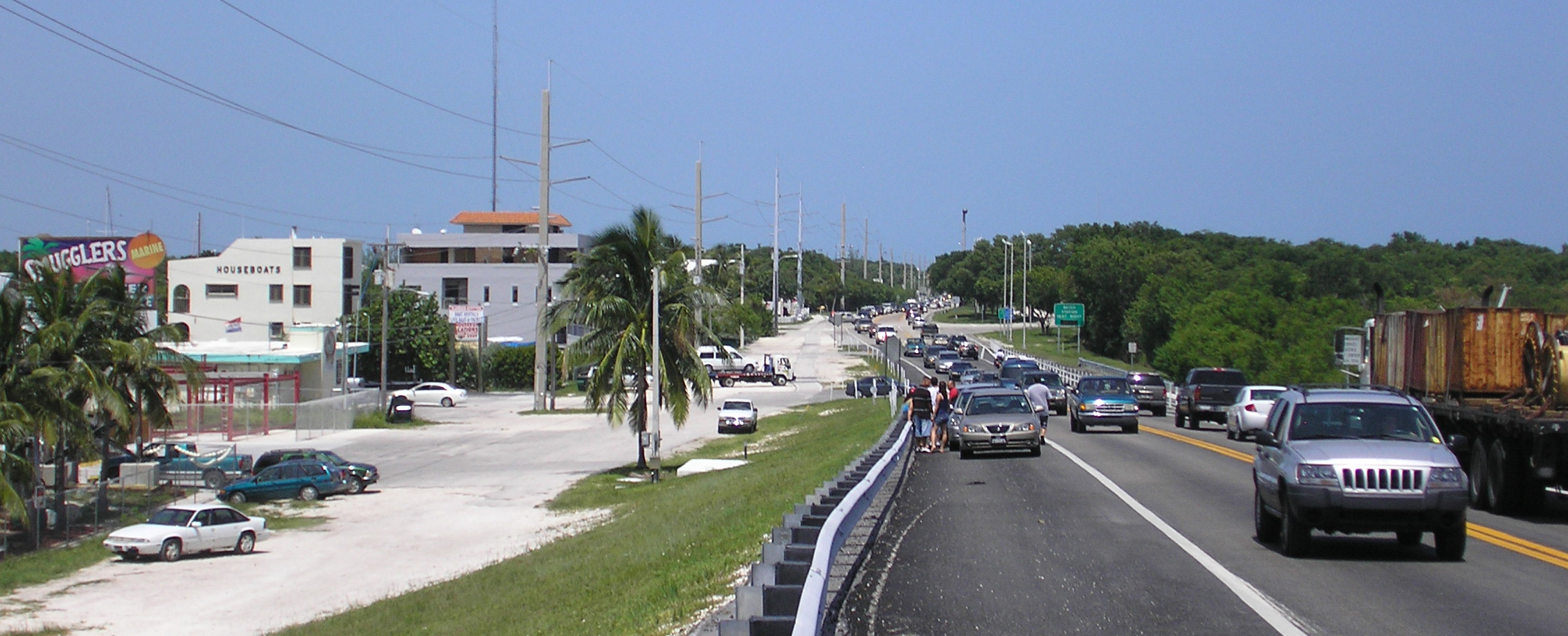
- Plantation Key, as seen from the Snake Creek drawbridge looking north.

- Plantation Key Plantation Key (the Caribbean)

Geography
- Location: Gulf of Mexico
- Coordinates: 24°59′04″N 80°33′40″W
- Archipelago: Florida Keys
- Adjacent to: Florida Straits

Administration
- United States
- State: Florida
- County: Monroe

Plantation Key is an island in Monroe County, Florida, United States. It is located in the upper Florida Keys on U.S. 1 (or the Overseas Highway), between Key Largo and Windley Key.

All of the key is within the Village of Islamorada as of November 4, 1997, when it was incorporated.

== Geography ==
Plantation Key is located at 24°58′33″N 80°33′08″W. It is separated from Key Largo by Tavernier Creek (Mile Marker 91.0) at its Northeast end, and from Windley Key by Snake Creek (Mile Marker 85.5) at its Southwest end.

== History ==
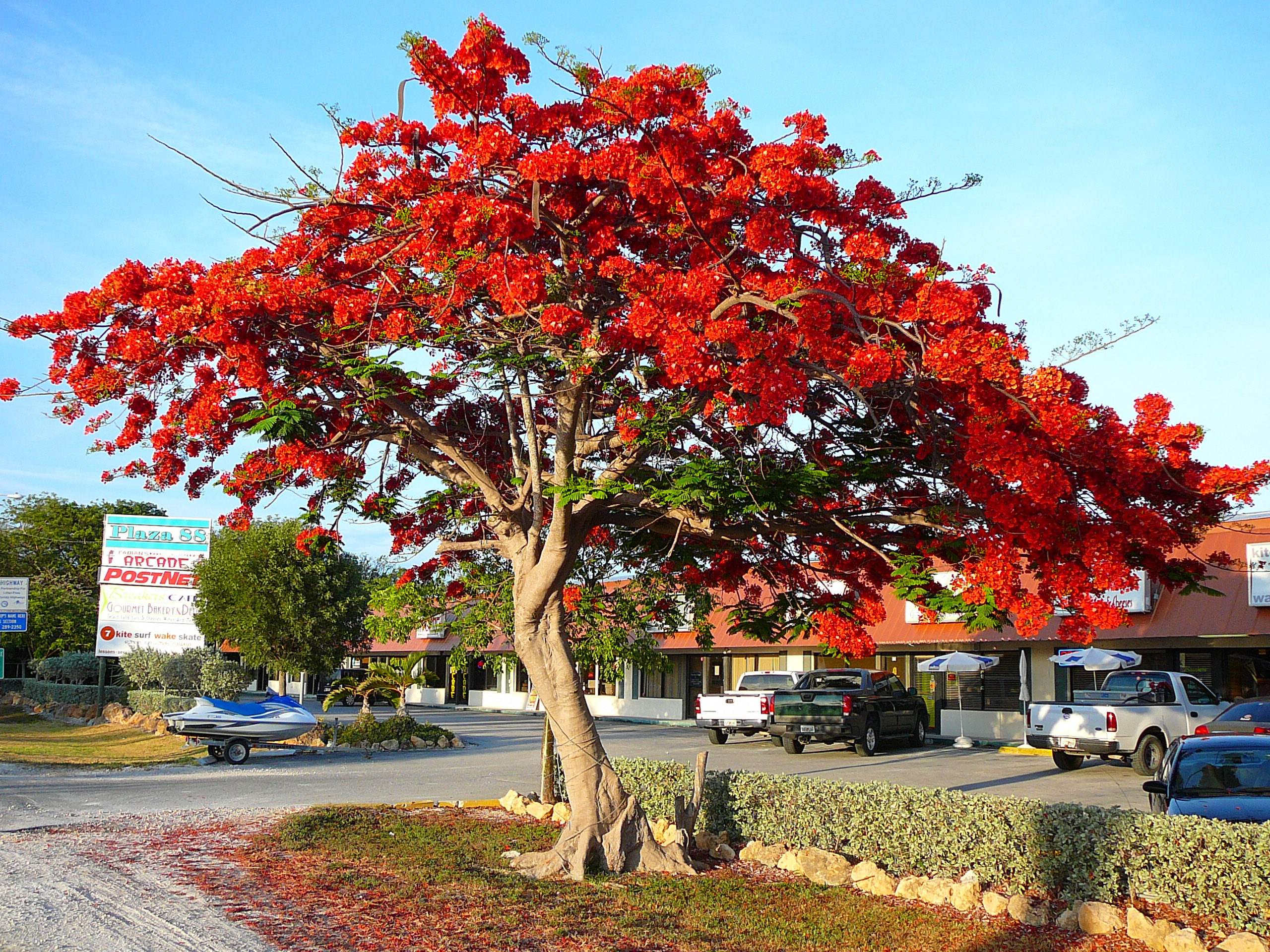
Royal Poinciana tree in full bloom on the Overseas Highway (Mile Marker 88) in Plantation Key, June 2008

Plantation Key was inhabited by Native Americans at least 1,000 years before European contact with the Americas. A large mound was formerly located towards the northeastern end of the key. Artifacts removed from the mound were dated to A.D. 500 to 700. The mound was leveled in 1958 to allow development of a real estate subdivision.

Immigrants from the Bahamas began settling on Plantation Key in the middle of the 19th century. Two families were recorded on the key in the 1870 census. Several more families had moved to the key by 1880. the settlers raised coconuts and pineapples. The pineapples were shipped by schooner to northern U. S. ports such as Baltimore and New York City.

The completion of the Overseas Railroad, which ran the length of Plantation Key, destroyed the agricultural economy of the island. The Florida East Coast Railway began shipping pineapples from Cuba at such low prices that the growers in the Keys could not compete. Prohibition brought new industry to Plantation Key, however, as the close proximity of the Florida Keys to the Bahamas made the keys, including Plantation Key, convenient landing places for bootleggers.

Before the Flagler railway crews filled Little Snake Creek, which crossed at a point around today's Treasure Harbor, the southwest end of Plantation Key was a separate island known as Snake Creek Key. Plantation Key is the site of a number of prehistoric Indian sites and mounds, most of which have been destroyed by development. An early settlement on the oceanside was known as Pearl City for a large conch pearl found by John Lowe.

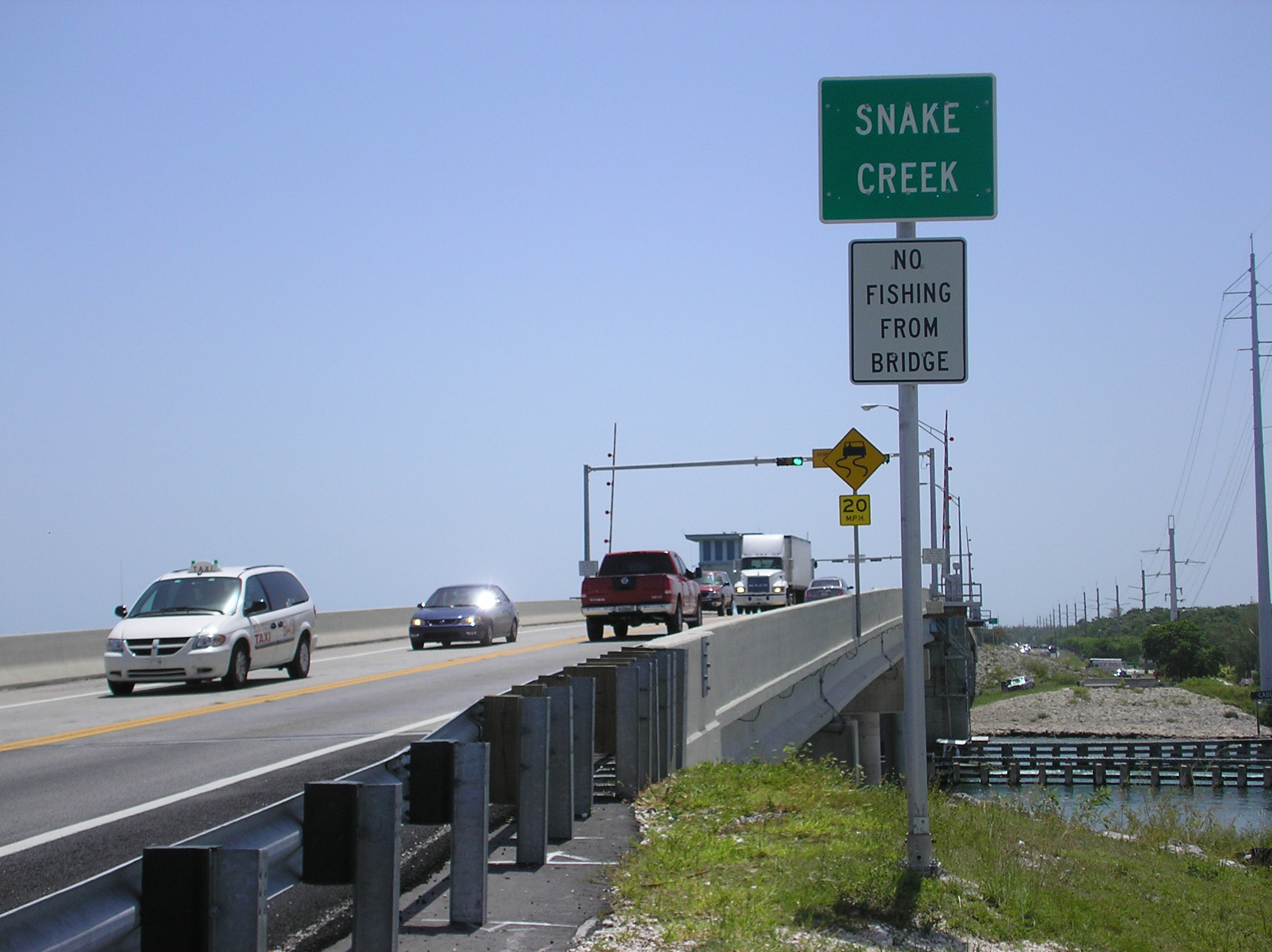
Snake Creek drawbridge at the southern tip of Plantation Key.

== Schools ==
It is within the Monroe County School District.

Plantation Key Elementary/Middle School (serving the Islamorada area) and Coral Shores High School (serving the upper Florida Keys from Islamorada to Key Largo) are located on Plantation Key.

== See also ==
- Plantation Key Colony
