= Islamorada, Florida =

- Village
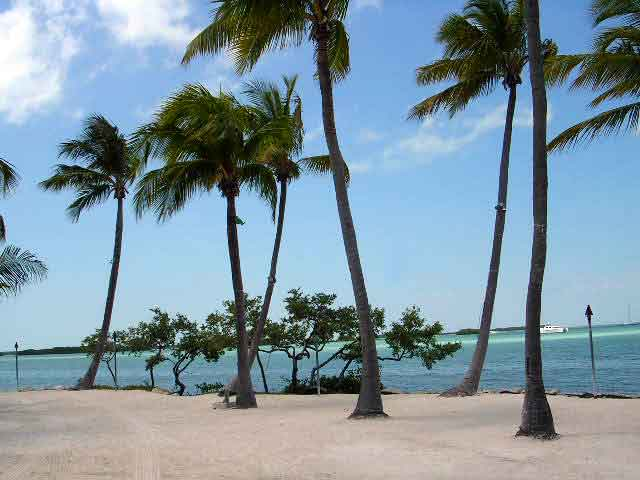
- One of a few beaches on the Atlantic side of Islamorada

- Seal
- Motto: "Village of Islands"
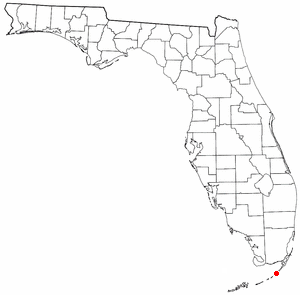
- Location of Islamorada, Florida

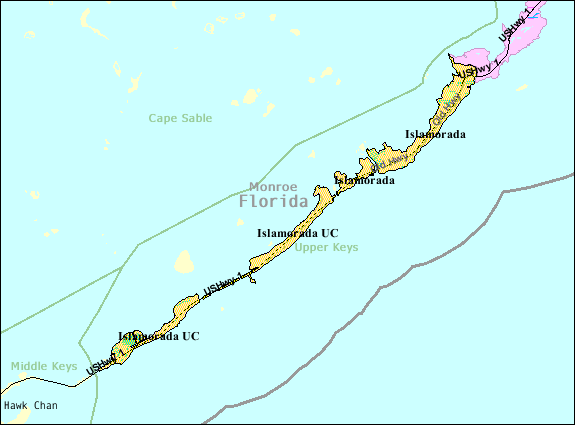
- U.S. Census Bureau map showing village boundaries
- Coordinates: 24°56′9″N 80°36′49″W
- Country: United States
- State: Florida
- County: Monroe
- Incorporated: December 31, 1997

Government
  - Type: Council–manager

Area
  - Total: 6.70 sq mi (17.35 km^{2})
  - Land: 6.45 sq mi (16.70 km^{2})
  - Water: 0.25 sq mi (0.65 km^{2})
- Elevation: 0 ft (0 m)

Population (2020)
  - Total: 7,107
  - Density: 1,102.0/sq mi (425.48/km^{2})
- Time zone: UTC-5 (Eastern (EST))
  - Summer (DST): UTC-4 (EDT)
- ZIP codes: 33036, 33070
- Area code: 305
- FIPS code: 12-34132
- GNIS feature ID: 2407481
- Website: islamorada.fl.us

Islamorada (eye-la-mor-AH-dah also sometimes spelled Isla Morada) is an incorporated village in Monroe County, Florida, United States. It is located directly between Miami and Key West on five islands—Tea Table Key, Lower Matecumbe Key, Upper Matecumbe Key, Windley Key, and Plantation Key—in the Florida Keys. As of the 2020 census, the village had a population of 7,107, up from 6,119 in 2010.

== History ==
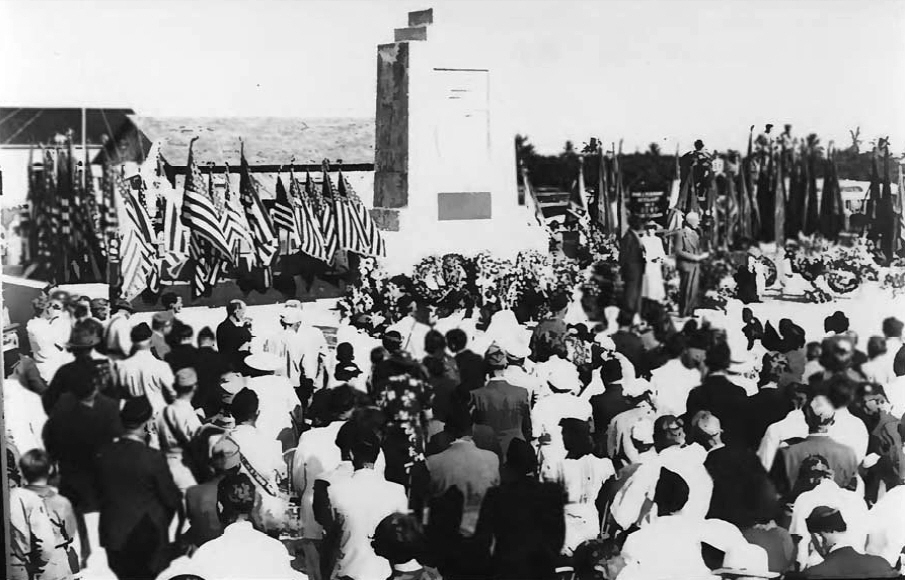
Dedication of Florida Keys Memorial, November 14, 1937

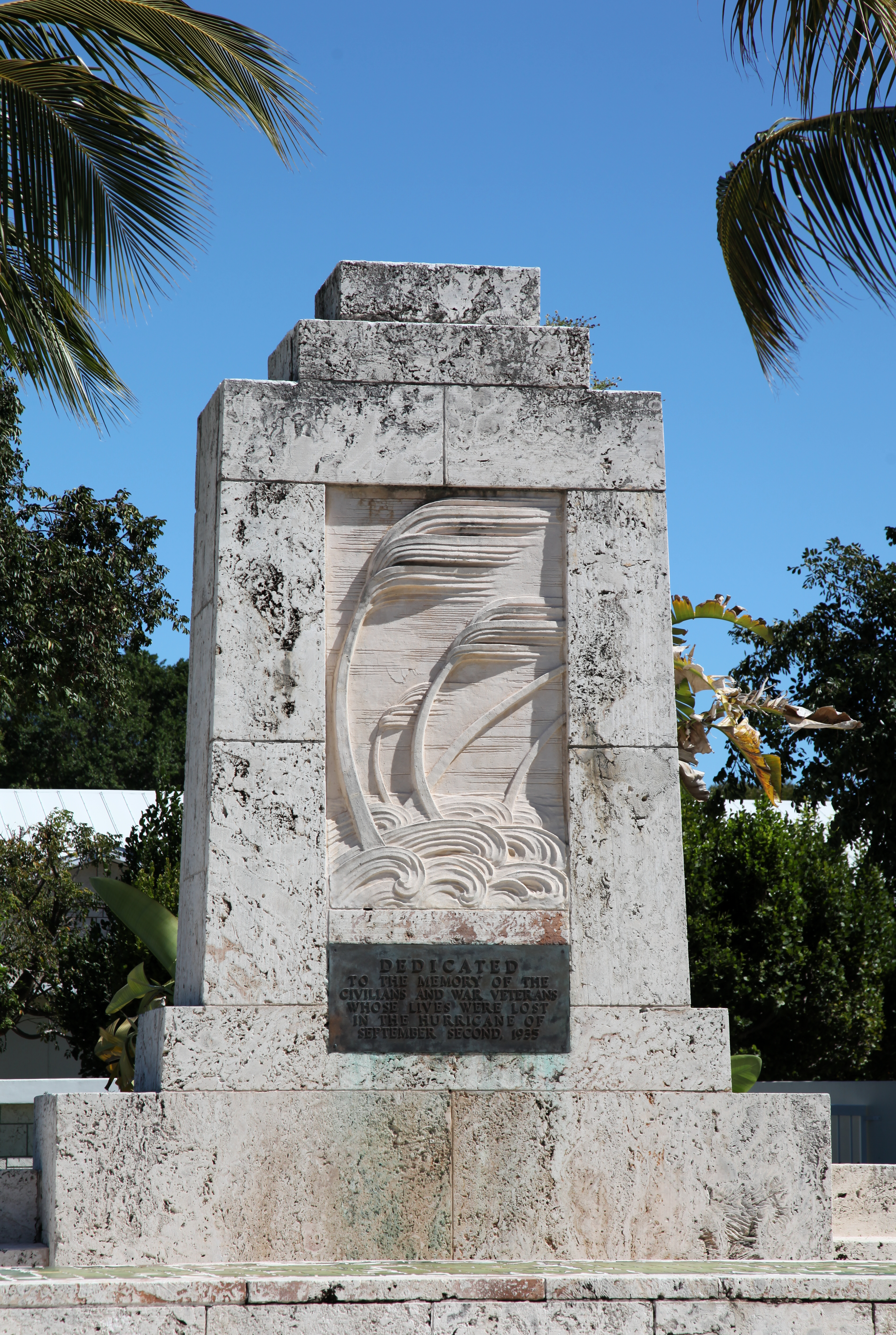
Relief and dedication

The name "Islamorada" (Spanish pronunciation: [ˈisla moˈɾaða]), spelled isla morada in Spanish, "Island Home", came from townsite founder William J. Krome.

Islamorada was the location of one of the stations of the Overseas Railroad.

Islamorada was hit almost directly by the Labor Day Hurricane of 1935, causing 423 deaths. A memorial, including the ashes of over 300 victims, exists today at Overseas Highway, mile marker 82.

Baseball player Ted Williams began visiting Islamorada in 1943, and for the next 45 years, he was the island's most well-known resident. After his retirement from baseball, he became the national spokesman for Sears sporting goods and became renowned for his abilities as a fisherman. Over the decades, he hosted numerous celebrities at his Islamorada house and took them on local fishing trips.

The village was incorporated on December 31, 1997. Before this date, Islamorada referred to the evolving community island of Upper Matecumbe Key.

== Geography ==
According to the United States Census Bureau, the village has a total area of 6.7 square miles (17 km^{2}), of which 0.3 sq mi (0.78 km^{2}), or 3.73%, is covered by water.

U.S. Route 1, the Overseas Highway, runs the length of the village, leading north 74 miles (119 km) to Miami and southwest 80 miles (130 km) to Key West. Islamorada is about 19 nautical miles (35 km; 22 mi) southwest of John Pennekamp Coral Reef State Park. With its position between the Atlantic Ocean and the Gulf of Mexico, Islamorada is on migration routes for many large fish species. Therefore, it is informally known as the "Sportfishing Capital of the World". The popular route, Hawk Channel, lies south or southeast of the village and is often used by commercial fishing vessels to avoid the currents of the Gulf Stream.

=== Climate ===
Islamorada has a tropical savanna climate (Aw), similar to the rest of the Florida Keys.

Climate data for Islamorada, Florida (1991–2020 normals, extremes 1999–2017)
Month	Jan	Feb	Mar	Apr	May	Jun	Jul	Aug	Sep	Oct	Nov	Dec	Year
Record high °F (°C)	83 (28)	85 (29)	86 (30)	89 (32)	90 (32)	96 (36)	97 (36)	96 (36)	95 (35)	92 (33)	90 (32)	84 (29)	97 (36)
Mean maximum °F (°C)	81.0 (27.2)	81.6 (27.6)	83.3 (28.5)	85.2 (29.6)	87.7 (30.9)	90.3 (32.4)	91.0 (32.8)	91.6 (33.1)	90.2 (32.3)	88.5 (31.4)	84.1 (28.9)	82.1 (27.8)	91.9 (33.3)
Mean daily maximum °F (°C)	75.2 (24.0)	76.7 (24.8)	78.1 (25.6)	81.0 (27.2)	83.7 (28.7)	86.8 (30.4)	88.7 (31.5)	89.1 (31.7)	88.3 (31.3)	85.1 (29.5)	80.2 (26.8)	77.6 (25.3)	82.5 (28.1)
Daily mean °F (°C)	69.8 (21.0)	71.7 (22.1)	73.5 (23.1)	76.7 (24.8)	79.9 (26.6)	82.4 (28.0)	84.1 (28.9)	84.1 (28.9)	83.5 (28.6)	80.7 (27.1)	75.7 (24.3)	72.7 (22.6)	77.9 (25.5)
Mean daily minimum °F (°C)	64.5 (18.1)	66.7 (19.3)	68.9 (20.5)	72.4 (22.4)	76.1 (24.5)	78.1 (25.6)	79.5 (26.4)	79.1 (26.2)	78.6 (25.9)	76.2 (24.6)	71.3 (21.8)	67.9 (19.9)	73.3 (22.9)
Mean minimum °F (°C)	48.3 (9.1)	52.6 (11.4)	56.2 (13.4)	62.8 (17.1)	70.1 (21.2)	71.7 (22.1)	73.0 (22.8)	72.7 (22.6)	72.3 (22.4)	68.1 (20.1)	58.6 (14.8)	55.3 (12.9)	45.9 (7.7)
Record low °F (°C)	37 (3)	41 (5)	47 (8)	54 (12)	64 (18)	67 (19)	70 (21)	71 (22)	70 (21)	57 (14)	54 (12)	41 (5)	37 (3)
Average precipitation inches (mm)	0.97 (25)	1.32 (34)	1.32 (34)	2.35 (60)	2.76 (70)	5.08 (129)	3.85 (98)	5.61 (142)	8.09 (205)	4.51 (115)	1.59 (40)	1.23 (31)	38.68 (982)
Average precipitation days (≥ 0.01 in)	4.8	4.4	4.4	3.8	6.4	9.5	9.6	9.9	12.0	9.2	5.6	7.3	86.9
Source: NOAA (mean maxima/minima 2000–2016)

== Demographics ==
Historical population
Census	Pop.	Note	%±
1970	1,251		—
1980	1,441		15.2%
1990	1,220		−15.3%
2000	6,846		461.1%
2010	6,119		−10.6%
2020	7,107		16.1%

The community is registered in the census as Islamorada, Village of Islands.

=== 2010 and 2020 census ===
Islamorada racial composition (Hispanics excluded from racial categories) (NH = Non-Hispanic)
Race	Pop 2010	Pop 2020	% 2010	% 2020
White (NH)	5,371	5,763	87.78%	81.09%
Black or African American (NH)	42	39	0.69%	0.55%
Native American or Alaska Native (NH)	22	14	0.36%	0.20%
Asian (NH)	36	49	0.59%	0.69%
Pacific Islander or Native Hawaiian (NH)	6	0	0.10%	0.00%
Some other race (NH)	7	25	0.11%	0.35%
Two or more races/multiracial (NH)	46	173	0.75%	2.43%
Hispanic or Latino (any race)	589	1,044	9.63%	14.69%
Total	6,119	7,107		

As of the 2020 United States census, 7,107 people, 2,997 households, and 1,788 families resided in the village.

As of the 2010 United States census, 6,119 people, 2,674 households, and 1,705 families lived in the village.

=== 2000 census ===
As of the census of 2000, 6,846 people, 3,174 households, and 1,853 families resided in the village. The population density was 371.8/km^{2} (962.5/mi^{2}). The 5,461 housing units had an average density of 296.6/km^{2} (767.7/mi^{2}). The racial makeup of the village was 96.84% White, 0.45% African American, 0.22% Native American, 0.61% Asian, 0.09% Pacific Islander, 0.79% from other races, and 0.99% from two or more races. Hispanic or Latino residents of any race were 6.72% of the population. Of the 3,174 households, 17.9% had children under 18 living with them, 50.2% were married couples living together, 4.9% had a female householder with no husband present, and 41.6% were not families. About 32.3% of all households were made up of individuals, and 8.9% had someone living alone who was 65 or older. The average household size was 2.10 and the average family size was 2.63.

In the village, the age distribution was 15.5% under 18, 4.5% from 18 to 24, 27.5% from 25 to 44, 35.6% from 45 to 64, and 16.9% were 65 years of age or older. The median age was 46 years. For every 100 females, there were 112.6 males. For every 100 females 18 and over, there were 112.2 males.

In 2000, the median income for a household in the village was $41,522, and for a family was $56,118. Males had a median income of $31,339 versus $25,670 for females. The per capita income for the village was $29,519. About 6.9% of the population and 3.5% of families were below the poverty line. Of the total people living in poverty, 7.0% were under 18 and 4.5% were 65 or older.

== Neighborhoods ==
Official neighborhoods within the village are:

- Lower Matecumbe Beach
- Matecumbe
- Moorings Village
- Plantation Key Colony

== Education ==
Residents are zoned to schools in the Monroe County School District.

- Zoned to Plantation Key School in Plantation Key
- Coral Shores High School
- Treasure Village Montessori Charter School

== Library ==
Islamorada Public Library-Helen Wadley Branch is part of the Monroe County Public Library. The first public library in the Keys opened in Key West in 1853, and today, five are located throughout the Keys that serve over 350,000 people. The current Islamorada Branch of the library is housed in a Works Progress Administration building, built originally as the Matecumbe School in the late 1930s. It was designed to be hurricane proof. As the number of children attending the school increased, they were moved to a larger school and the building housed several other entities before opening as the Islamorada Branch of the Monroe County Library in 1966. It was not considered a "usual" library, as it offered couches and tea and coffee. Today, the building is slightly larger than it was when it first opened its doors in 1938. Two additions were made, one in 1983 and another in 1999. The library was rededicated in 1983, in honor of Mrs. Helen Wadley, a true friend of the library. This branch is home to six WPA commissioned bas relief sculptures by Joan van Breeman.

== Culture ==
The History of Diving Museum opened in 2005. It has featured exhibits about Diving With a Purpose and the USS Spiegel Grove, now an artificial reef. Betsy the Lobster is a large sculpture of a lobster in the city.

== Notable people ==
- Jimmy Johnson, former college and NFL coach
- LaHatchet, rapper
- Dave Portnoy, Barstool Sports
- Robert E. Rich, Jr., chairman of Rich Products

== In popular culture ==
Much of the action in the series Bloodline takes place in and around Islamorada.
