= WFFG =

WFFG may refer to:

- WFFG (AM), a radio station (1300 AM) licensed to Marathon, Florida, United States
- WFFG-FM, a radio station (100.3 FM) licensed to Warrensburg, New York, United States
