= WGAY =

WGAY may refer to:

- WGAY (FM), a radio station (105.7 FM) licensed to serve Sugarloaf Key, Florida, United States
- WMDF-LD, a low-power television station (channel 4) licensed to serve Miami, Florida, which held the call sign WGAY-LP from 2006 to 2009
- WIHT, a radio station (99.5 FM) licensed to serve Washington, D.C., which held the call sign WGAY-FM or WGAY from 1960 to 1999
- WBQH, a radio station (1050 AM) licensed to serve Silver Spring, Maryland, United States, which held the call sign WGAY from 1946 to 1960 and 1973 to 1984
