= 1935 Labor Day hurricane =

Category 5 Atlantic hurricane in 1935

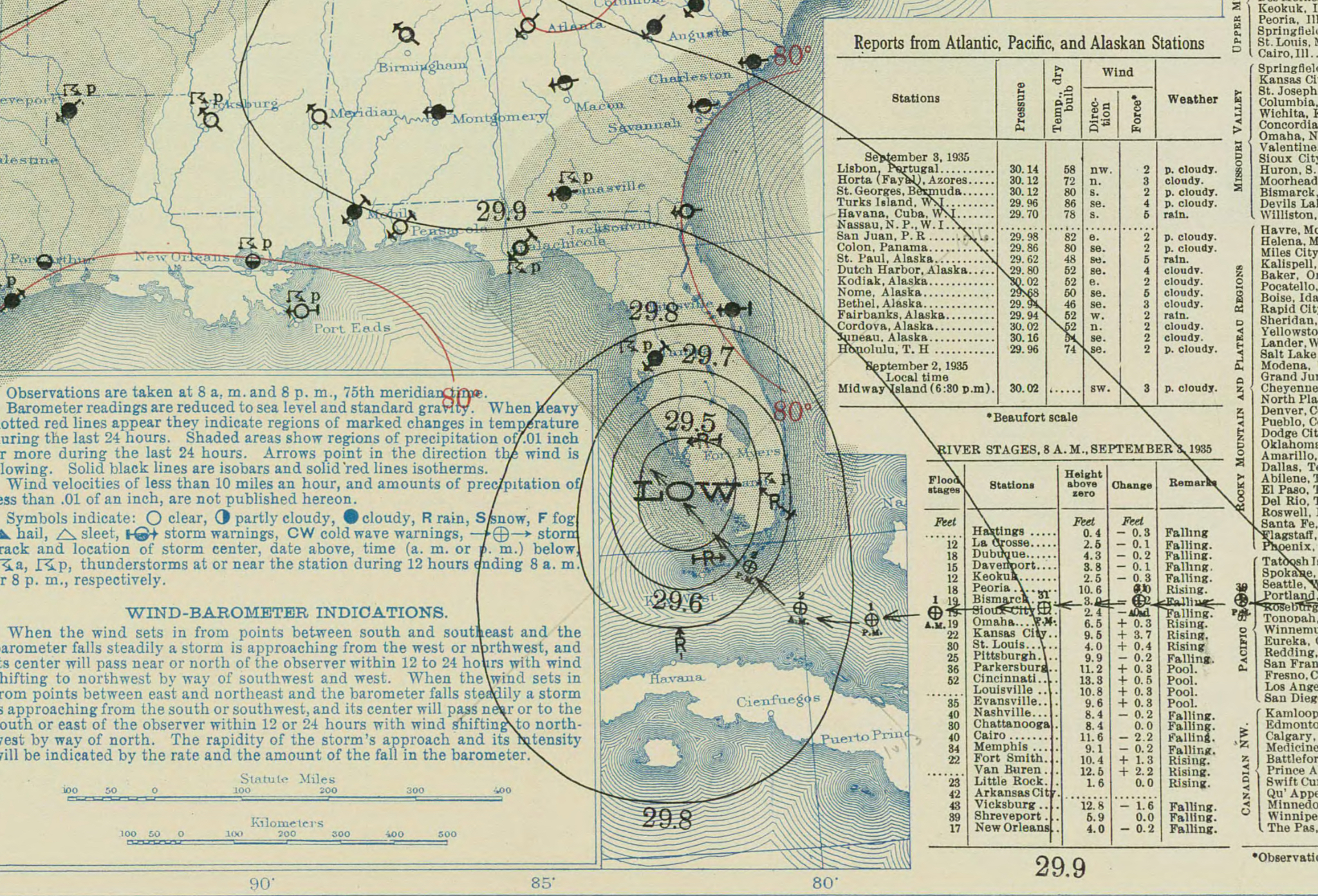
- Weather Bureau map on September 3, showing the hurricane shortly after its peak intensity and landfall in the Upper Florida keys

Meteorological history
- Formed: August 29, 1935
- Extratropical: September 6, 1935
- Dissipated: September 10, 1935

Category 5 major hurricane
- 1-minute sustained (SSHWS/NWS)
- Highest winds: 185 mph (295 km/h)
- Lowest pressure: 892 mbar (hPa); 26.34 inHg (Tied for third-lowest in the Atlantic basin)

Overall effects
- Fatalities: 490
- Damage: $100 million (1935 USD)
- Areas affected: British Bahamas; Florida; Georgia; Carolinas; Mid-Atlantic; New England
- IBTrACS
- Part of the 1935 Atlantic hurricane season

The 1935 Labor Day hurricane was an extremely powerful and devastating Atlantic hurricane that struck the southeastern United States in early September 1935. For several decades, it was the most intense Atlantic hurricane on record in terms of barometric pressure, (Note: Surpassed by Hurricane Gilbert (1988)) 1-minute sustained winds, (Note: Surpassed by Hurricane Allen (1980)) and the strongest at landfall by 1-minute sustained winds. (Note: Tied with Hurricane Dorian (2019) and Hurricane Melissa (2025).) The fourth tropical cyclone, third tropical storm, second hurricane, and second major hurricane of the 1935 Atlantic hurricane season, it is the first of four Category 5 hurricanes on record to strike the contiguous United States, along with Hurricane Camille (1969), Hurricane Andrew (1992), and Hurricane Michael (2018).

The hurricane intensified rapidly during its time, passing near Long Key on Labor Day evening, September 2. The region was swept by a massive storm surge as the eye passed over the area. The waters quickly receded after carving new channels connecting the bay with the ocean; however, gale-force winds and rough seas persisted into Tuesday, disrupting rescue efforts. The storm continued northwestward along the Florida west coast, weakening before making its second landfall near Cedar Key, Florida, on September 4.

The hurricane caused catastrophic damage in the upper Florida Keys, as a storm surge of approximately 18 to 20 feet (5.5 to 6.1 m) swept over the low-lying islands. The hurricane's strong winds and the surge destroyed nearly all the structures between Tavernier and Marathon. The town of Islamorada was obliterated. Portions of the Key West Extension of the Florida East Coast Railway were severely damaged or destroyed. In addition, many veterans died in work camps created for the construction of the Overseas Highway, in part due to poor working conditions. The hurricane also caused more damage in northwest Florida, Georgia, and the Carolinas.

== Meteorological history ==
Map plotting the storm's track and intensity, according to the Saffir–Simpson scale Map key Saffir–Simpson scale Tropical depression (≤38 mph, ≤62 km/h) Tropical storm (39–73 mph, 63–118 km/h) Category 1 (74–95 mph, 119–153 km/h) Category 2 (96–110 mph, 154–177 km/h) Category 3 (111–129 mph, 178–208 km/h) Category 4 (130–156 mph, 209–251 km/h) Category 5 (≥157 mph, ≥252 km/h) Unknown Storm type Tropical cyclone Subtropical cyclone Extratropical cyclone, remnant low, tropical disturbance, or monsoon depression

An area of disturbed weather developed northeast of the Turks Islands toward the end of August. By August 31, a definite tropical depression appeared near Long Island in the southeastern Bahamas and quickly intensified. It reached hurricane intensity near the south end of Andros Island on September 1. The storm then explosively intensified and turned toward the Florida Keys at a speed of 10 mph. The storm had an eye 9–10 miles (14–16 km) across. The storm made landfall late on September 2 near Long Key, at peak intensity, with an intensity of 892 millibars (26.3 inHg) and 1-minute sustained winds of 185 mph (298 km/h). After leaving the Keys, the storm weakened as it skirted the Florida gulf coast, making a second landfall at Cedar Key. The storm sped up and rapidly weakened over the Mid-Atlantic states, causing heavy rainfall, with the highest total being 16.7 inches (420 mm) in Easton, Maryland. The storm finally emerged over the open Atlantic near Cape Henry. The storm continued into the North Atlantic Ocean, where it merged with an extratropical cyclone on September 10.

Most intense Atlantic hurricanes
Rank	Hurricane	Season	Pressure	
Rank	Hurricane	Season	hPa	inHg
1	Wilma	2005	882	26.05
2	Gilbert	1988	888	26.23
3	"Labor Day"	1935	892	26.34
3	Melissa	2025	892	26.34
5	Rita	2005	895	26.43
5	Milton	2024	895	26.43
7	Allen	1980	899	26.55
8	Camille	1969	900	26.58
9	Katrina	2005	902	26.64
10	Mitch	1998	905	26.73
10	Dean	2007	905	26.73
Source: HURDAT

The first recorded instance of an aircraft flown for the specific purpose of locating a hurricane occurred on the afternoon of September 2, 1935. The Weather Bureau's 1:30 PM advisory placed the center of the hurricane at north latitude 23° 20', west longitude 80° 15', moving slowly westward. This was about 27 miles (43 km) north of Isabela de Sagua, Villa Clara, Cuba, and 145 miles (233 km) east of Havana. Captain Leonard Povey of the Aviation Corps of the Cuban Army (Cuerpo de Aviación del Ejército de Cuba) volunteered to investigate the threat to the capital. Flying a Curtis Hawk II, Captain Povey, an American expatriate, who was the Aviation Corps' chief training officer, observed the storm north of its reported position. Because he was flying an open-cockpit biplane, he opted not to fly into the storm. He later proposed an aerial hurricane patrol. Nothing further came of this idea until June 1943, when Colonel Joe Duckworth and Lieutenant Ralph O'Hair flew into a hurricane near Galveston, Texas.

Strongest landfalling Atlantic hurricanes^{†}
Rank	Hurricane	Season	Wind speed	
Rank	Hurricane	Season	mph	km/h
1	"Labor Day"	1935	185	295
1	Dorian	2019	185	295
1	Melissa	2025	185	295
4	Irma	2017	180	285
5	Janet	1955	175	280
5	Camille	1969	175	280
5	Anita	1977	175	280
5	David	1979	175	280
5	Dean	2007	175	280
10	"Cuba"	1924	165	270
10	Andrew	1992	165	270
10	Maria	2017	165	270
Source: HURDAT, AOML/HRD
†Strength refers to maximum sustained wind speed upon striking land.

=== Records ===
The Labor Day hurricane was the most intense tropical cyclone known to make landfall in the Western Hemisphere, having the lowest sea level pressure ever officially recorded on land—a central pressure of 892 millibars (26.3 inHg)—suggesting an intensity of between 162 and 164 knots (186 and 189 mph). The somewhat compensating effects of a slow (7 knots, 8.1 mph) translational velocity along with an extremely tiny radius of maximum wind (5 nmi, 5.8 miles) led to an analyzed intensity at landfall of 160 knots (184 mph; 296 km/h). The 1935 Labor Day hurricane is also tied with 2019's Hurricane Dorian and 2025's Hurricane Melissa for the highest intensity for a landfalling Atlantic hurricane in HURDAT2, as 1969's Hurricane Camille has been reanalyzed in 2014 to have the fifth highest landfalling intensity with 150 kn (173 mph; 278 km/h) winds.

== Preparations ==
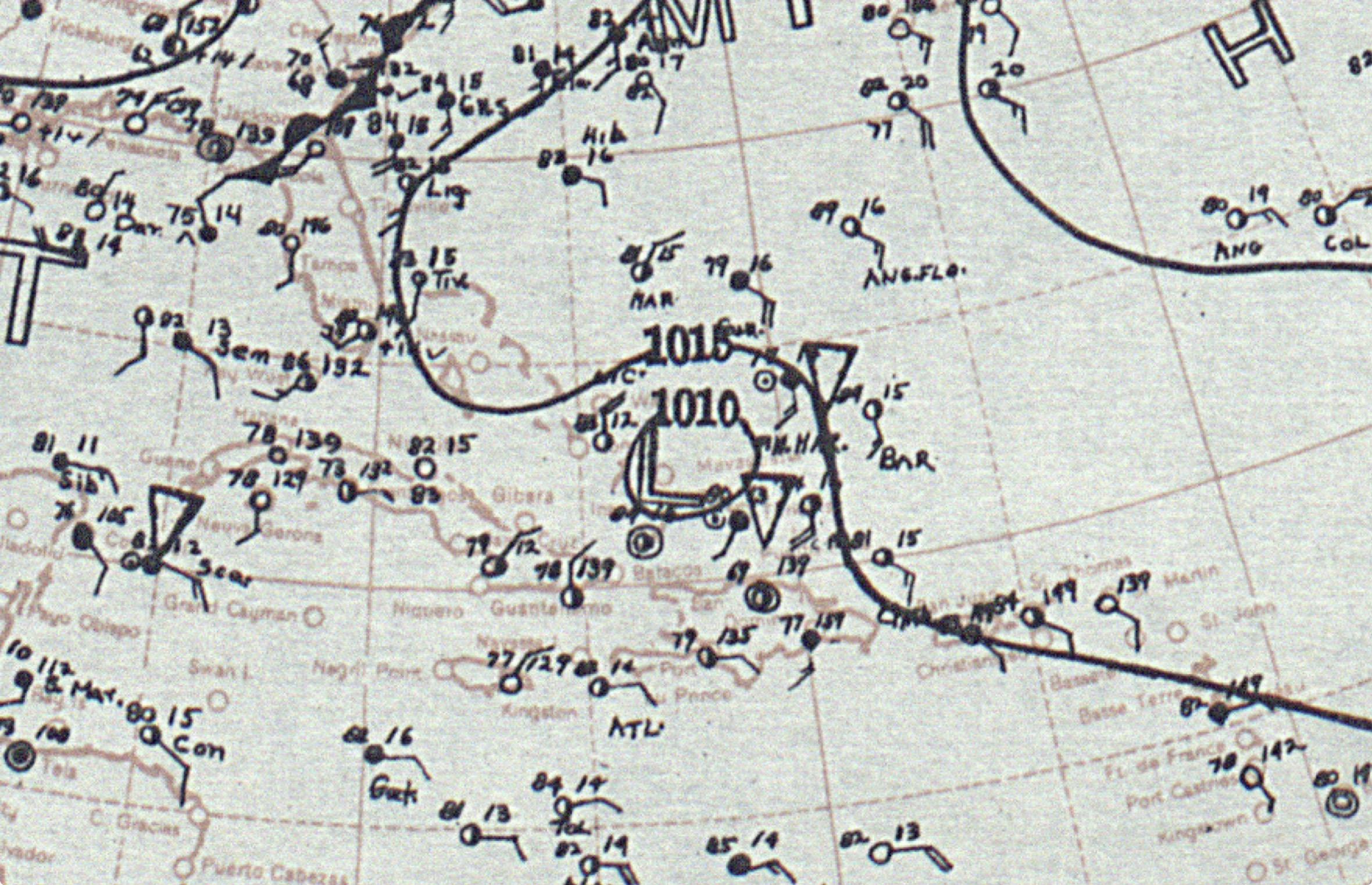
Weather map of the storm approaching the Bahamas on August 30

Northeast storm warnings were ordered displayed from Fort Pierce to Fort Myers in the September 1, 9:30 AM Weather Bureau advisory. Upon receipt of this advisory, the U.S. Coast Guard Station in Miami, Florida sent a plane along the coast to advise boaters and campers of the impending danger by dropping message blocks. A second flight was made on Sunday afternoon. Afterwards, the planes were placed in the hangar and its door closed at 10:00 AM Monday.

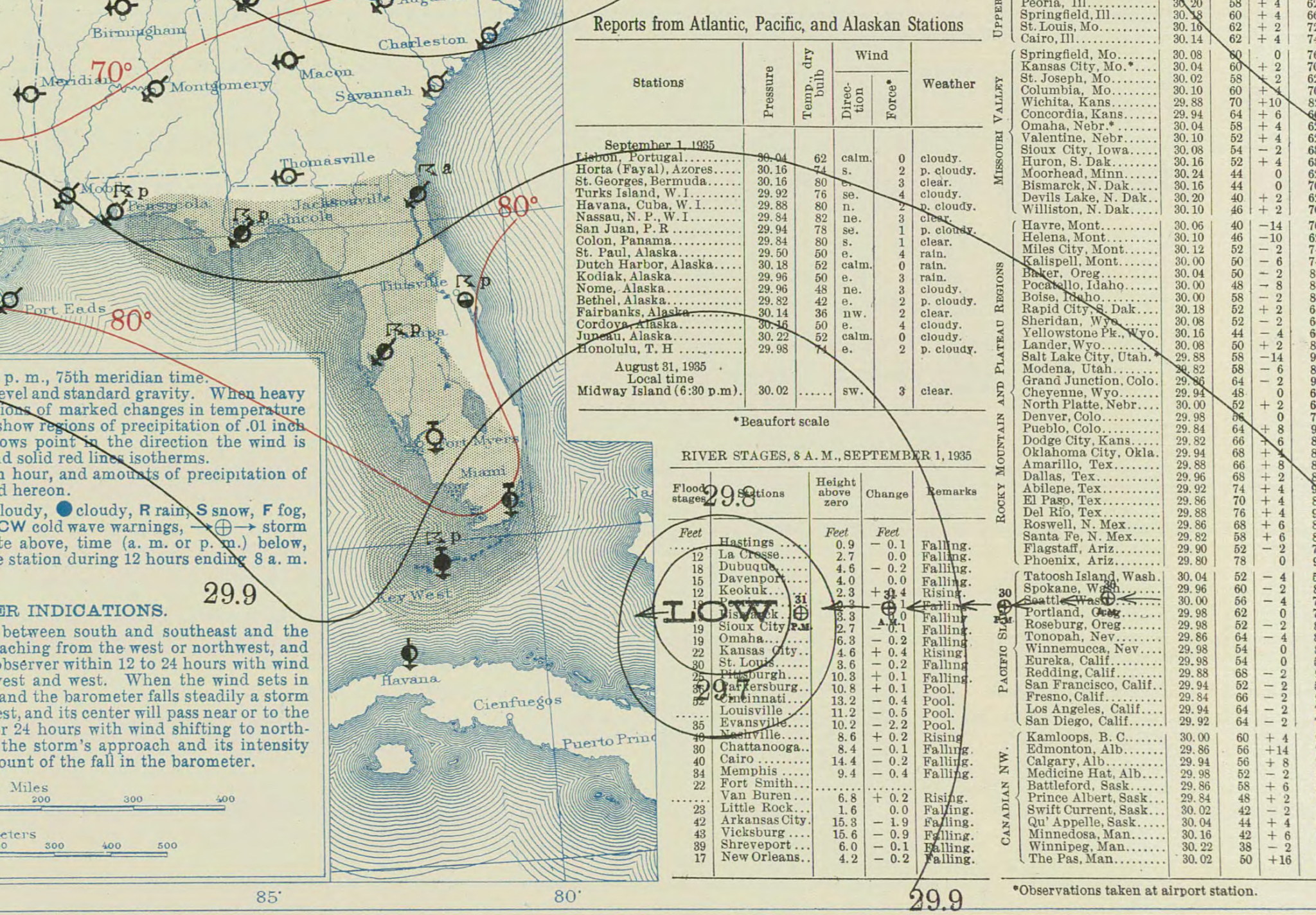
Surface weather map showing the hurricane approaching the Florida Straits on September 1

The 3:30 AM advisory on September 2 (Labor Day) predicted that the disturbance "will probably pass through the Florida Straits Monday" and cautioned "against high tides and gales Florida Keys and ships in path". The 1:30 PM advisory ordered hurricane warnings for the Key West district, extending north to Key Largo. At around 2:00 PM, Fred Ghent, Assistant Administrator of the Florida Emergency Relief Administration, requested a special train to evacuate the veterans work camps located in the upper keys.

The train departed Miami at 4:25 PM. Delayed by a drawbridge opening, obstructions across the track, poor visibility, and the need to reverse the locomotive below Homestead so it could lead the return trip, it finally arrived at the Islamorada station on Upper Matecumbe Key at about 8:20 PM. This coincided with an abrupt wind shift from the northeast (Florida Bay) to the southeast (Atlantic Ocean) and the arrival of the storm surge along the coast.

== Impact ==
Strongest landfalling Atlantic U.S. hurricanes^{†}
Rank	Name^{‡}	Season	Wind speed	
Rank	Name^{‡}	Season	mph	km/h
1	"Labor Day"	1935	185	295
2	Camille	1969	175	280
3	Andrew	1992	165	270
4	"San Felipe II"*	1928	160	260
4	Michael	2018	160	260
6	Maria	2017	155	250
7	"Last Island"	1856	150	240
7	"Indianola"	1886	150	240
7	"Florida Keys"	1919	150	240
7	"Freeport"	1932	150	240
7	Charley	2004	150	240
7	Laura	2020	150	240
7	Ida	2021	150	240
7	Ian	2022	150	240
Source: NHC, AOML/HRD
^{†}Strength refers to maximum sustained wind speed upon striking land.
^{‡}Systems prior to 1950 were not officially named.
*Name given to the storm at its peak landfall.

In the Bahamas, the colonial government reported that the cyclone caused minor damage to property, but no injuries or fatalities. Additionally, the Climatological Data journal noted that "there was one report of some damage on the extreme southern end of Andros Island". Rough seas impacted the north coast of Cuba, while the storm also caused some impacts in Camagüey and Santa Clara provinces due to overflowing inland streams.

Three ships were reported to have run aground in the Florida Keys during the storm. The Danish motorship Leise Maersk was carried over and grounded nearly 4 miles away near Upper Matecumbe Key, although there was no loss of life. The engine room was flooded and the ship was disabled. The American tanker Pueblo lost control near 24°40′N 80°25′W around 2 pm on September 2 and was pushed around the storm's center, ending up in Molasses Reef nearly eight hours later. The passenger steamship Dixie ran aground on French Reef. She was re-floated and towed to New York on September 19. No fatalities resulted from the incident.

The hurricane produced squalls and sustained winds up to 45 mph (72 km/h) on Key West, causing little damage. Similarly, mostly minor impacts occurred on Big Pine and No Name keys, aside from winds blowing away tar paper roofs and ripping window screens. In Marathon, the hurricane demolished a large fish house on Boot Key. Many dwellings lost their roofs, while some others were destroyed. A school building also suffered damage to its roof and some doors and windows, while a Florida East Coast Railway dredge was swept about three blocks inland. One fisherman in Marathon died. Significant damage occurred to a fish house on Key Vaca, where water reached up to 8 ft (2.4 m) above ground, causing the death of one person. Extensive washouts to the railway and roads were reported on Crawl and Grassy keys. Waves swept away four people on the latter. Additionally, a report by the Florida Emergency Relief Administration noted that "the only thing standing on this key is one-half of the white foreman's house".

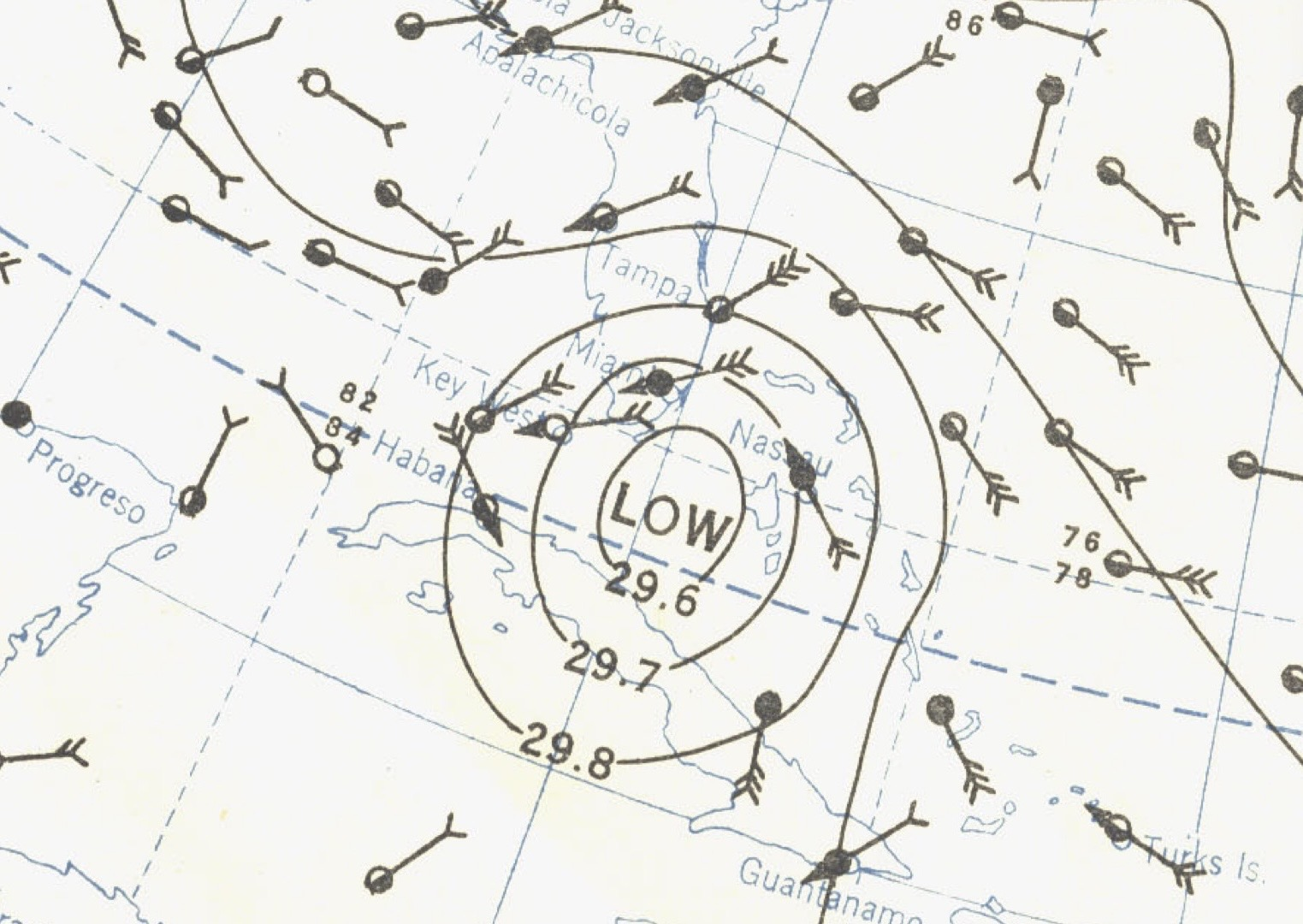
Surface weather analysis showing the hurricane rapidly intensifying in the Florida Straits early on September 2, just several hours prior to landfall in the Upper Florida Keys

In the Upper Florida Keys, the hurricane left a path of near-total destruction, centered on what is today the village of Islamorada, although the hurricane's destructive path was narrower than most tropical cyclones. Its eye was 8 mi (13 km) across and the fiercest winds extended 20 mi (32 km) off the center, similar to 1992's Hurricane Andrew, which was also a relatively small and catastrophic Category 5 hurricane. The Florida section of Climatological Data stated that the Upper Florida Keys experienced winds from 150 to 200 mph (240 to 320 km/h), while gusts probably went above 200 mph (320 km/h). Tides reached high enough to wash away crossties and railroad tracks of the Florida East Coast Railway, which had viaducts that were 30 ft (9.1 m) above the average water level. Additionally, storm surge ranged from 18 to 20 ft (5.5 to 6.1 m) in height.

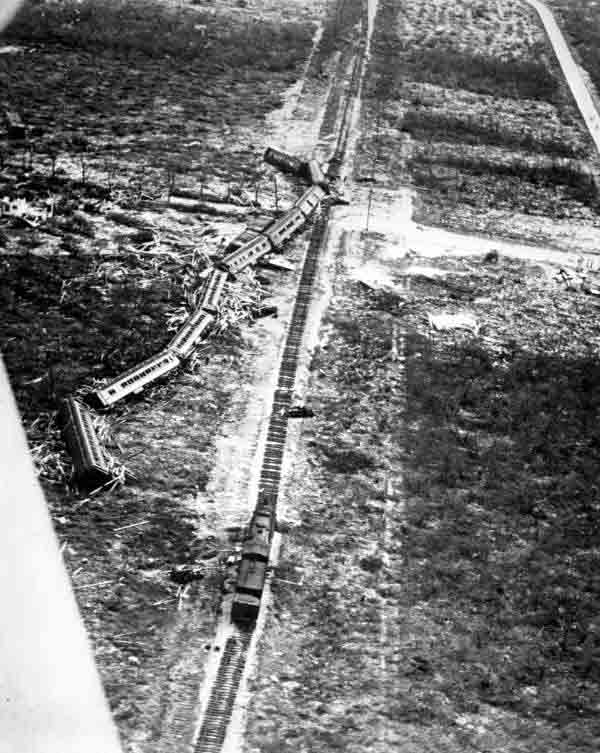
Florida East Coast Railway Overseas Railroad relief train derailed near Islamorada

The cyclone destroyed most of a fishing camp and a hotel, the railway, and vegetation on Long Key. The few buildings that remained standing were moved by the storm surge. On the tiny island of Craig Key, a post office, home, and marina were demolished, while the bridge tender's house suffered damage. Following a damage assessment conducted by Dr. R. E. Christie, a Red Cross volunteer director from Miami, he reported that a 12 mi (19 km)-stretch of the Upper Florida Keys from Lower Matecumbe Key to Tavernier was "washed as clean as a billiard table by the tidal wave". The eye of the storm passed a few miles to the southwest creating a calm of about 40 minutes duration over Lower Matecumbe and 55 minutes (9:20–10:15 PM) over Long Key. At Camp #3 on Lower Matecumbe the surge arrived near the end of the calm with the wind close behind. Nearly every structure was demolished, and some bridges and railway embankments were washed away. The links—rail, road, and ferry boats—that chained the islands together were broken. The main transportation route linking the Keys to mainland Florida had been a single railroad line, the Florida Overseas Railroad portion of the Florida East Coast Railway.

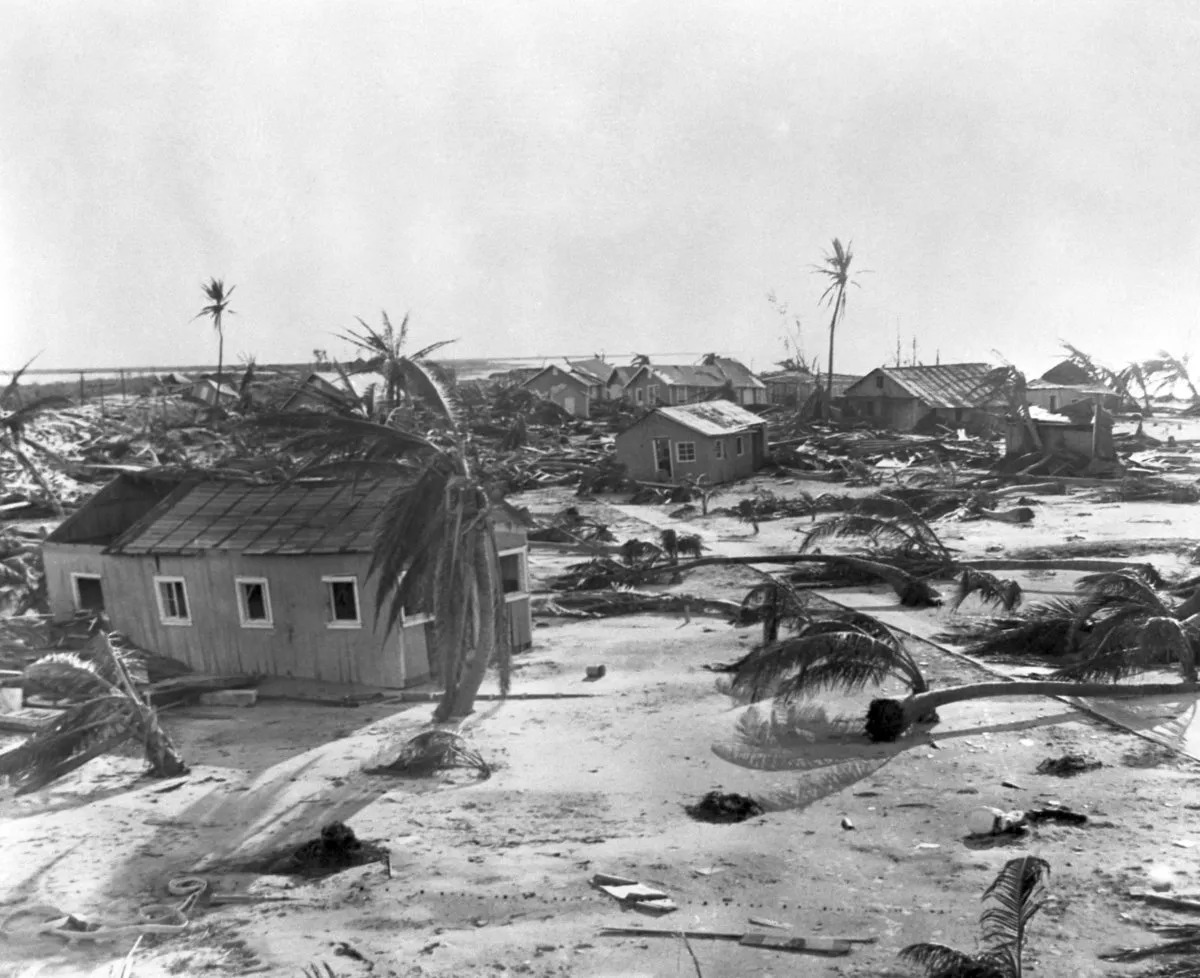
Wreckage and destroyed homes in the Florida Keys after the hurricane

On Upper Matecumbe Key, near Islamorada, an eleven-car evacuation train encountered a powerful storm surge topped by cresting waves. Eleven cars were swept from the tracks, leaving only the locomotive and tender upright and still on the rails. Remarkably, everyone on the train survived. The locomotive and tender were both barged back to Miami several months later. Storm surge and abnormally high tides also removed just over 2 mi (3.2 km) of fill between Lower and Upper Matecumbe Key, restoring the natural channel between the two islands. Captain Ed Butters on Upper Matecumbe Key claimed that his barometer fell to 880 mbar (26 inHg). However, this could not be verified because Captain Butters tossed the instrument into the storm under distress. Thus, the observation of 892 mbar (26.3 inHg) recorded on Craig Key remains the lowest barometric pressure associated with the hurricane. Only a bathtub remained of the Carribee Colony tourist camp, while the storm severed off the second floor of the Hotel Matecumbe.

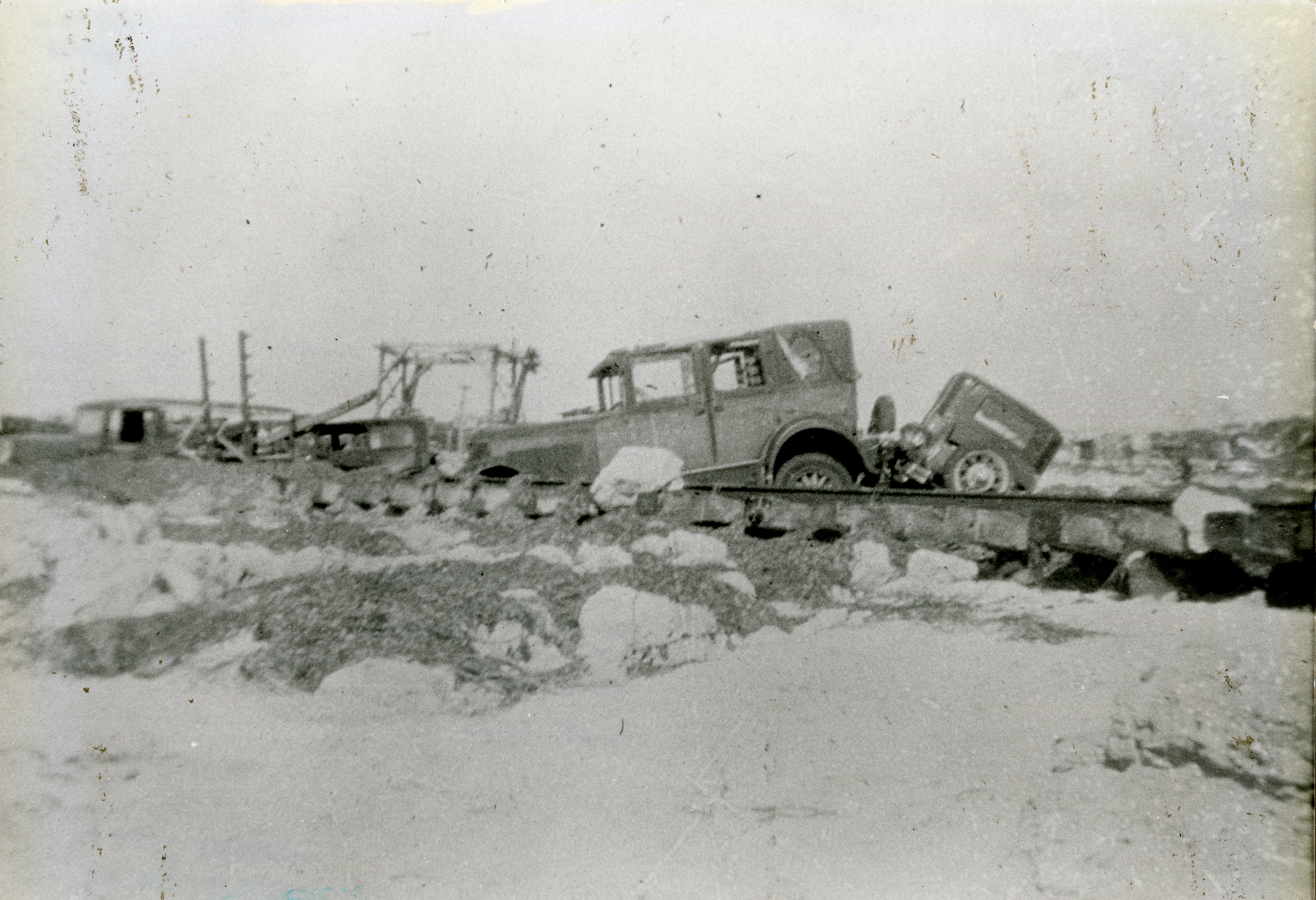
The Matecumbe Ferry Slip after the hurricane

An account by Ernest Hemingway noted that "not a blade of grass" remained on Indian Key. However, at Alligator Reef Lighthouse, located about 5 mi (10 km) to the southeast, a large glass plane remained intact. On Windley Key, 40 people sheltered in a makeshift veterans hospital were forced to move to the second floor due to storm surge flooding, before the building was eventually destroyed. Five or six washouts occurred along the highway from Snake Creek (between Windley Key and Plantation Key) to Key Largo. Tides at Tavernier reached 15.2 ft (4.6 m) above mean sea level at a train station, or roughly 6 ft (1.8 m) above ground. Approximately 30 out of the 50 residences in Tavernier were virtually demolished. Farther north on Key Largo, the Card Sound Bridge was washed out. Florida Road Department chief engineer J. H. Dowling estimated that throughout the Florida Keys, the hurricane destroyed approximately 15 mi (25 km) of the Overseas Highway.

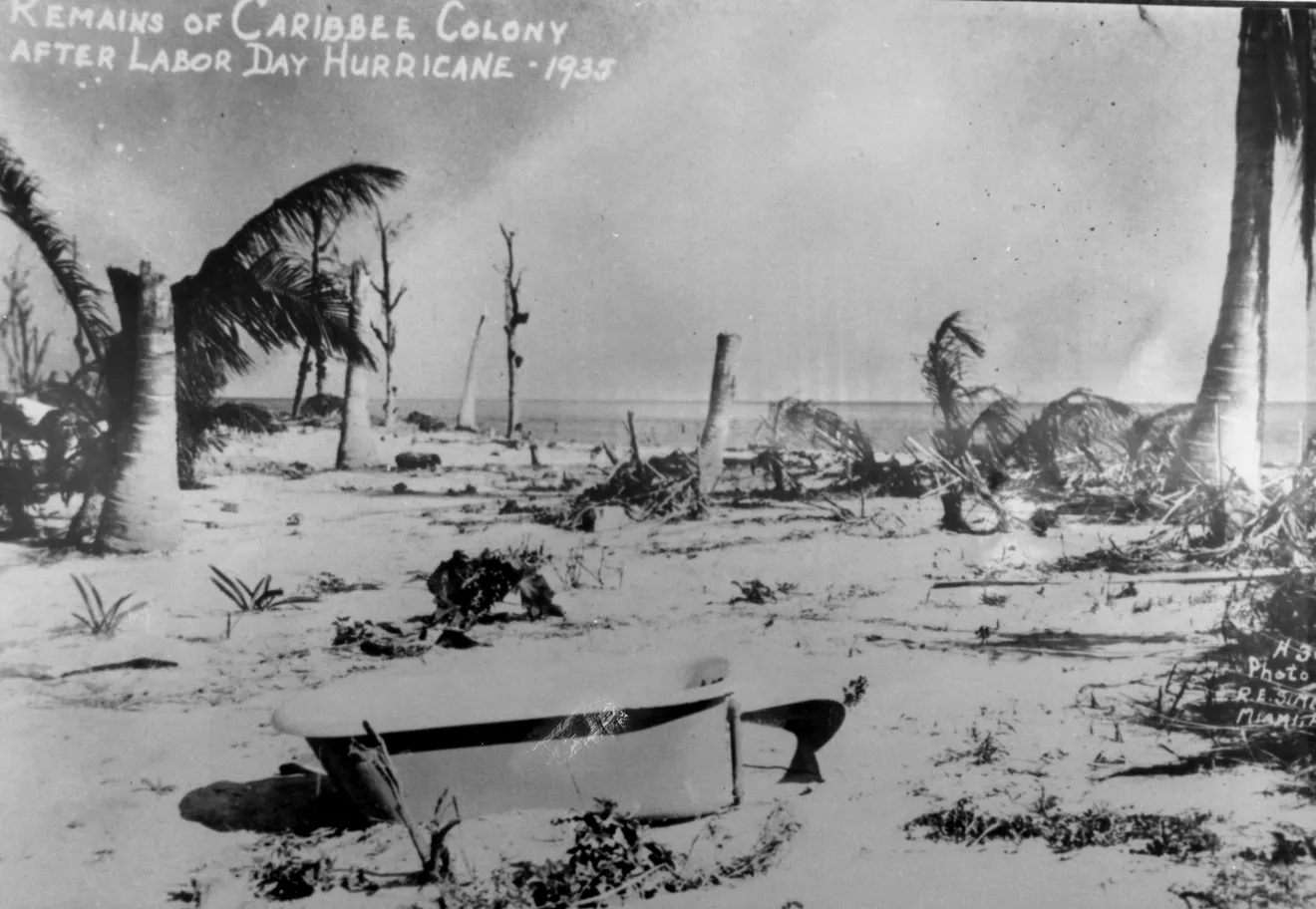
The devastation of the Caribbee Colony in Matecumbe Key after the hurricane

After the third day of the storm corpses swelled and split open in the subtropical heat, according to rescue workers. Public health officials ordered plain wood coffins holding the dead to be stacked and burned in several locations. The National Weather Service estimated 408 deaths from the hurricane. Bodies were recovered as far away as Flamingo and Cape Sable on the southwest tip of the Florida mainland. The United States Coast Guard and other federal and state agencies organized evacuation and relief efforts. Boats and airplanes carried injured survivors to Miami. The railroad was never rebuilt, but temporary bridges and ferry landings were under construction as soon as materials arrived. On March 29, 1938, the last gap in the Overseas Highway linking Key West to the mainland was completed. The new highway incorporated the roadbed and surviving bridges of the railway.

Parts of southeast Florida, including Miami and West Palm Beach, mainly experienced downed trees, signs, and powerlines, leaving some people without electricity. However, sustained winds estimated at 80 mph (130 km/h) in Homestead led to substantial crop damage in southern Dade County, while a warehouse was partially deroofed and numerous trees littered the road to the Florida Keys. Losses to crops in the vicinity of Homestead ranged from $400,000 to $600,000. Around Cape Sable, the storm destroyed many structures and crops and severely injured three people at Flamingo. In Collier County, Seminole camps suffered damage due to high winds and floods, while the roads leading from the Tamiami Trail to Marco Island and Everglades City were left impassable due to being submerged. Everglades City itself was inundated with up to 2 ft (0.61 m) of water, but no noteworthy damage occurred other than to wires, trees, and vegetation.

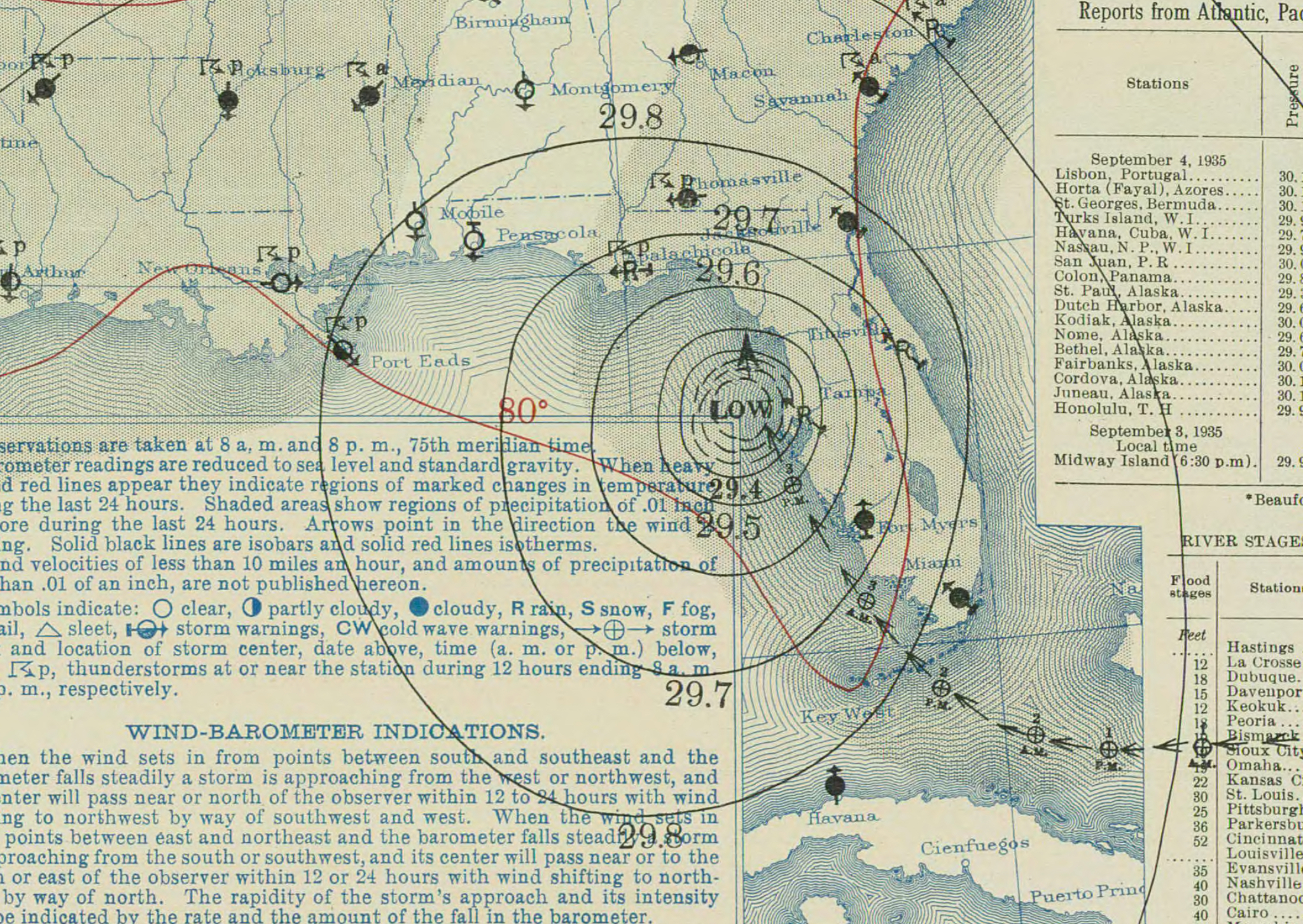
Weather map of the hurricane moving up the West Coast of Florida on September 4

The hurricane destroyed over half of Naples's 1,000 ft (300 m) fishing pier. One person died on State Road 80 near the Hendry–Lee county line when a bus overturned in rainy conditions. The latter also reported damage to approximately 25% of citrus crops, several unroofed buildings, and numerous toppled trees. Rainfall inundated some streets along the Caloosahatchee River with up to 2 ft (0.61 m) of water. The hurricane deroofed several homes on Gasparilla Island, including at Boca Grande, causing most people on the island to evacuate. Despite wind gusts reaching 65 mph (105 km/h), Tampa held municipal elections on September 3. A two-story building housing a voting precinct was destroyed, while many other polling places lost electricity, forcing voting to be conducted in candlelight. Throughout the city, the hurricane downed wires, signs, and trees, and washed out roads in a number of places. The Ybor City neighborhood reported the deroofing of a post office and the shattering of windows at several businesses. Along Florida's gulf coast, the hurricane impacted Cedar Key particularly severely. Nearly all roofs experienced at least minor damage, many of which were blown off, while winds also downed many trees and power lines. The cyclone also severely damaged docks and fishing vessels. Three deaths occurred in the town.

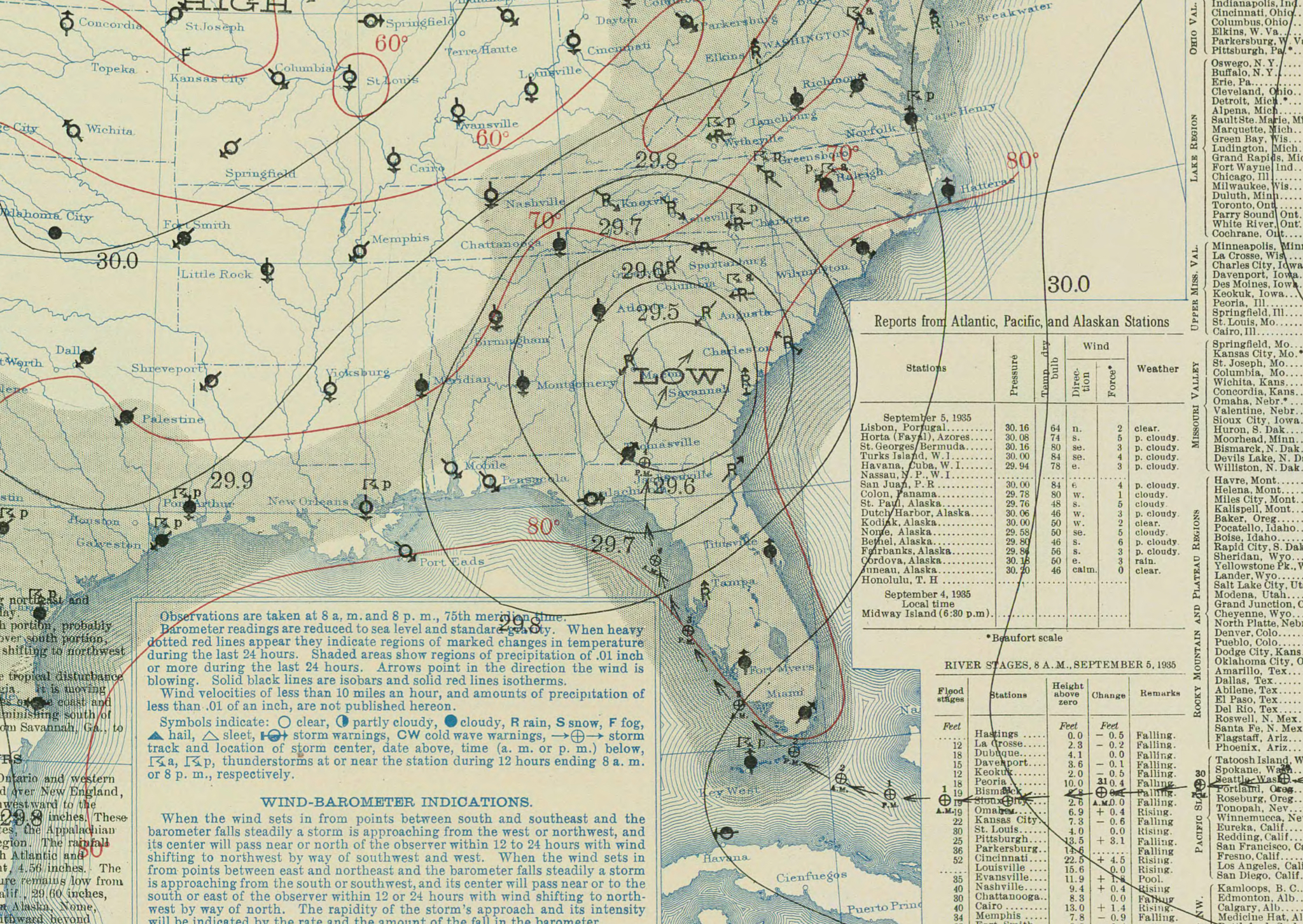
Weather map of the storm over Georgia on September 5

Florida governor David Sholtz described Horseshoe Beach in Dixie County" as "completely isolated, with nearly every home there destroyed". A loss of roughly 80% of commercial timber occurred in neighboring Taylor County, where approximately 300 families became homeless. In Gainesville, a large pine tree struck an engineering department building at the University of Florida. Governor Sholtz also reported high winds and that "all communications facilities have been disrupted" in Tallahassee. The storm brought over 5 in (130 mm) of rain to parts of Georgia when it passed over the state between September 4–5. The heavy rainfall in southern Georgian counties led to the spoilage of cotton. Attendant winds also ruined crops and inflicted minor damage to property, including a power line falling on a store in Quitman, which set the building on fire. Barometric pressures fell to 980 mbar (28.9 inHg) at Valdosta, the lowest ever recorded there.

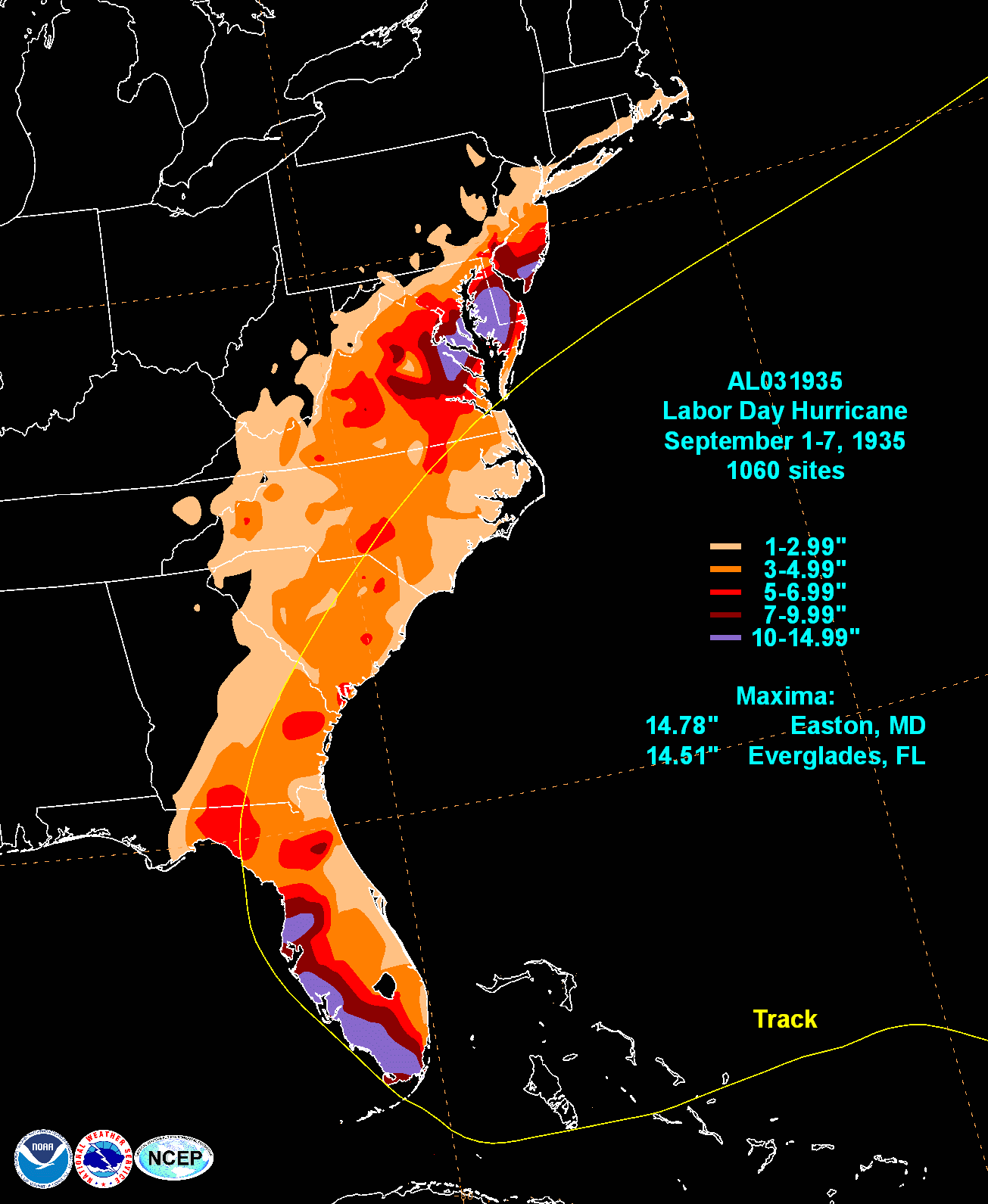
Map of the total rainfall from the hurricane

Property damage along the coastal regions of South Carolina amounted to $15,000, with the damage primarily occurring in the vicinity of Beaufort, Georgetown, and Walterboro. Damage to crops in South Carolina was also considerable, with high winds blowing down cotton, corn, sugar cane, and other unharvested crops. Windthrown trees also injured several people. In North Carolina, several houses in New Bern were set ablaze after the storm toppled many power lines and poles. The downed power lines also led to two deaths. Another fatality occurred in North Carolina near Gastonia due to blinding rains preventing a driver from seeing an oncoming train. Corn suffered heavy losses in Virginia, contributing the bulk of the state's $1.65 million crop damage toll. A tornado in Farmville killed two people and another twister in Courtland caused one fatality after destroying a home. The former tornado also impacted Hampden–Sydney College, deroofing an administration building, unrooting ancient oak trees, and tossing approximately 20 headstones from a cemetery on the school's property.

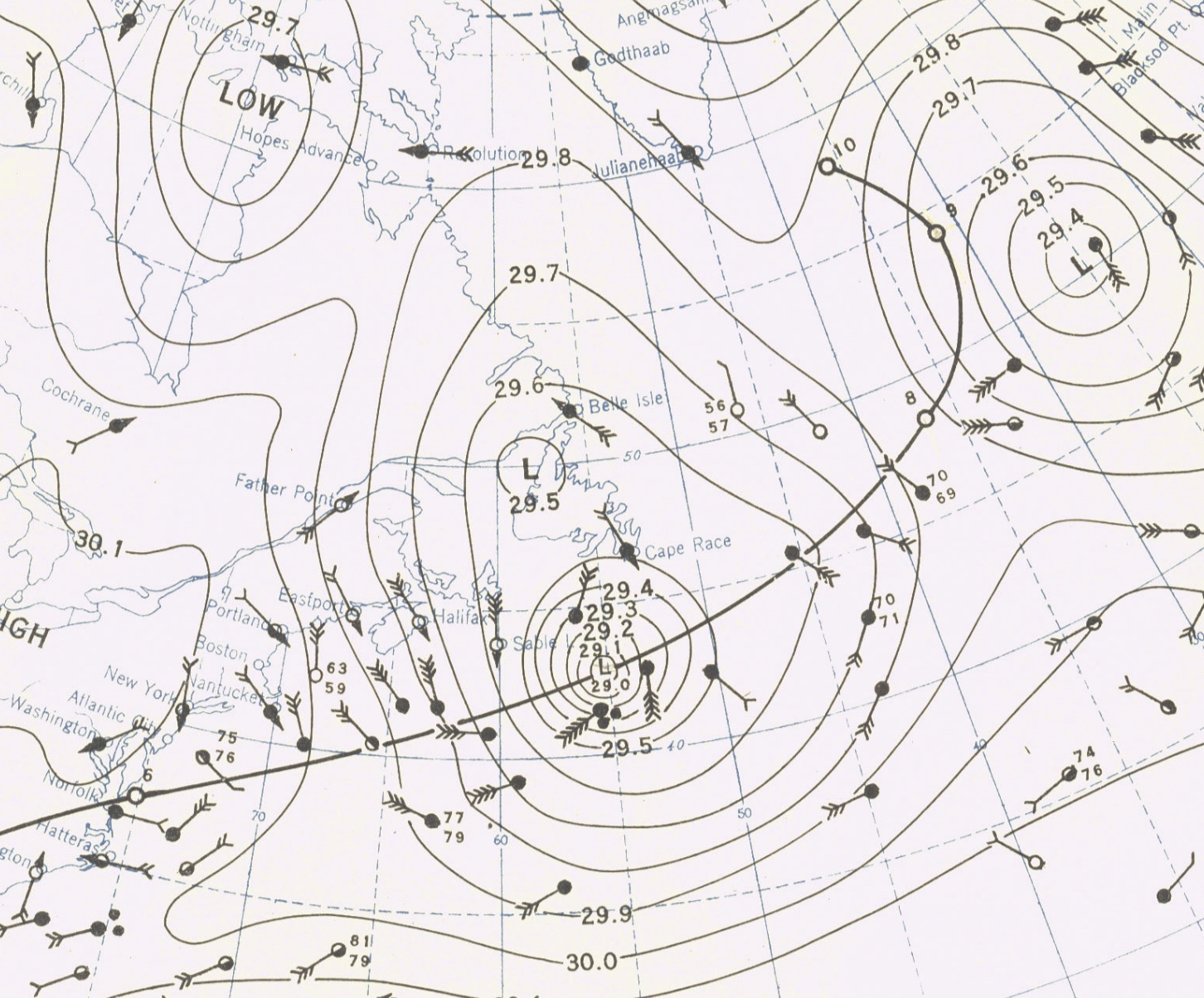
Weather map of the hurricane's extratropical remnants to the south of Newfoundland on September 7

Although winds had decreased over land by the time the storm reached the Mid-Atlantic states, the storm brought excessive rainfall that caused substantial damage to the region's crops. The storm became the wettest tropical cyclone on record for ten counties in Maryland and two counties in Delaware, with rainfall totals peaking between 15–16 in (380–410 mm); the highest measured rainfall total was 16.63 in (422 mm) in Easton, Maryland. Approximately 1,000 people along the Eastern Shore fled their homes due to flooding. Impacts from the storm in Maryland and Delaware were primarily concentrated in the southern portions of the two states; the cost of the damage amounted to around $2 million, including losses of $1 million in Caroline County, Maryland. High tides and heavy rains over South New Jersey flooded parts of Cape May County, with knee-high water leaving many families marooned. Four communities lost electricity after lightning struck a transformer in Sea Isle City. Many boats were submerged at Stone Harbor and Ocean City.

== Aftermath ==
=== Response ===
==== Veterans' work camps ====
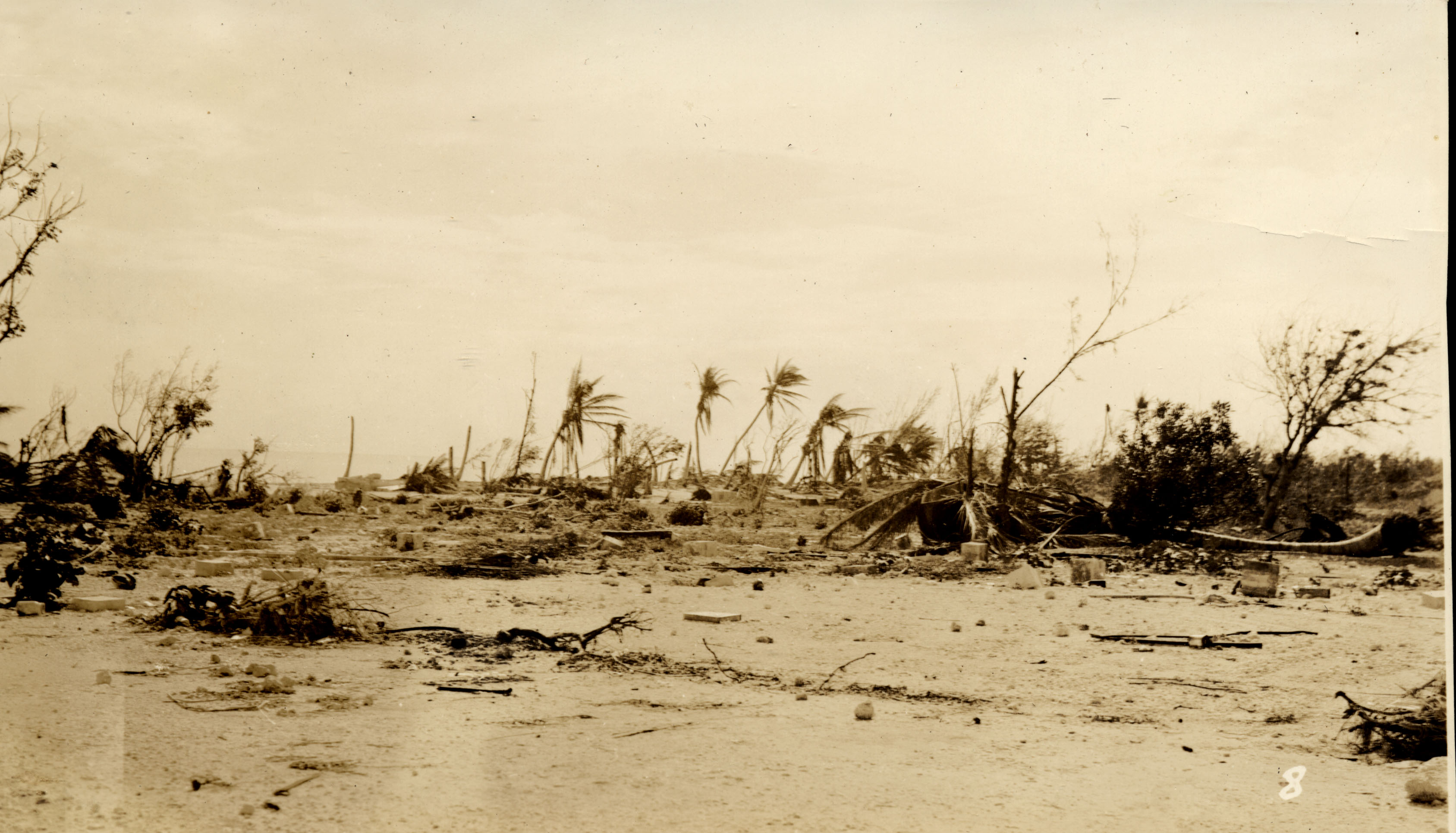
Destruction of the Caribbee Colony after the hurricane

Three veterans' work camps existed in the Florida Keys before the hurricane: #1 on Windley Key, #3 and #5 on Lower Matecumbe Key. The camp payrolls for August 30 listed 695 veterans. They were employed in a project to complete the Overseas Highway connecting the mainland with Key West. The camps, including seven in Florida and four in South Carolina, were established by Harry L. Hopkins, director of the Federal Emergency Relief Administration (FERA). In the autumn of 1934, the problem of transient veterans in Washington, D.C. "threatened ... to become acute and did become acute in January". Facilities in the capital were inadequate to handle the large numbers of veterans seeking jobs. President Franklin D. Roosevelt met with Mr. Hopkins and Robert Fechner, director of the Civilian Conservation Corps (CCC) to discuss solutions. He "suggested the Southern camp plan and approved the program worked out by Mr. Hopkins for their establishment and maintenance". The VA identified eligible veterans. FERA offered grants to the states for their construction projects if they would accept the veterans as laborers. The state Emergency Relief Administrations were responsible for the daily management of the camps.

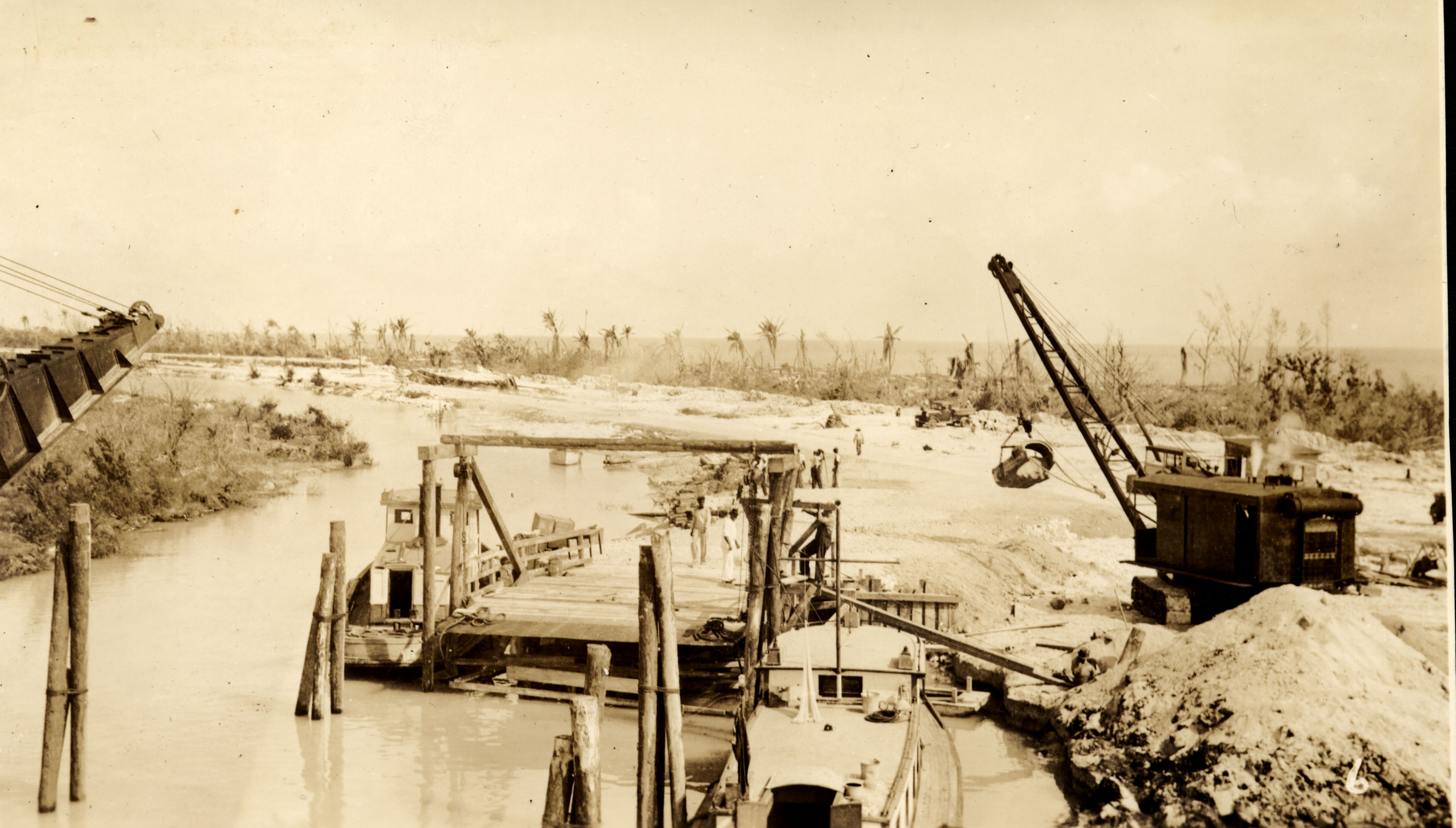
The temporary highway ferry slip on Upper Matecumbe after the hurricane

In August 1935, Time Magazine and The New York Times published sensational articles about the veteran camps. On August 15, 1935, Hopkins announced the termination of the veterans work program and closure of the camps.

==== Rescue ====
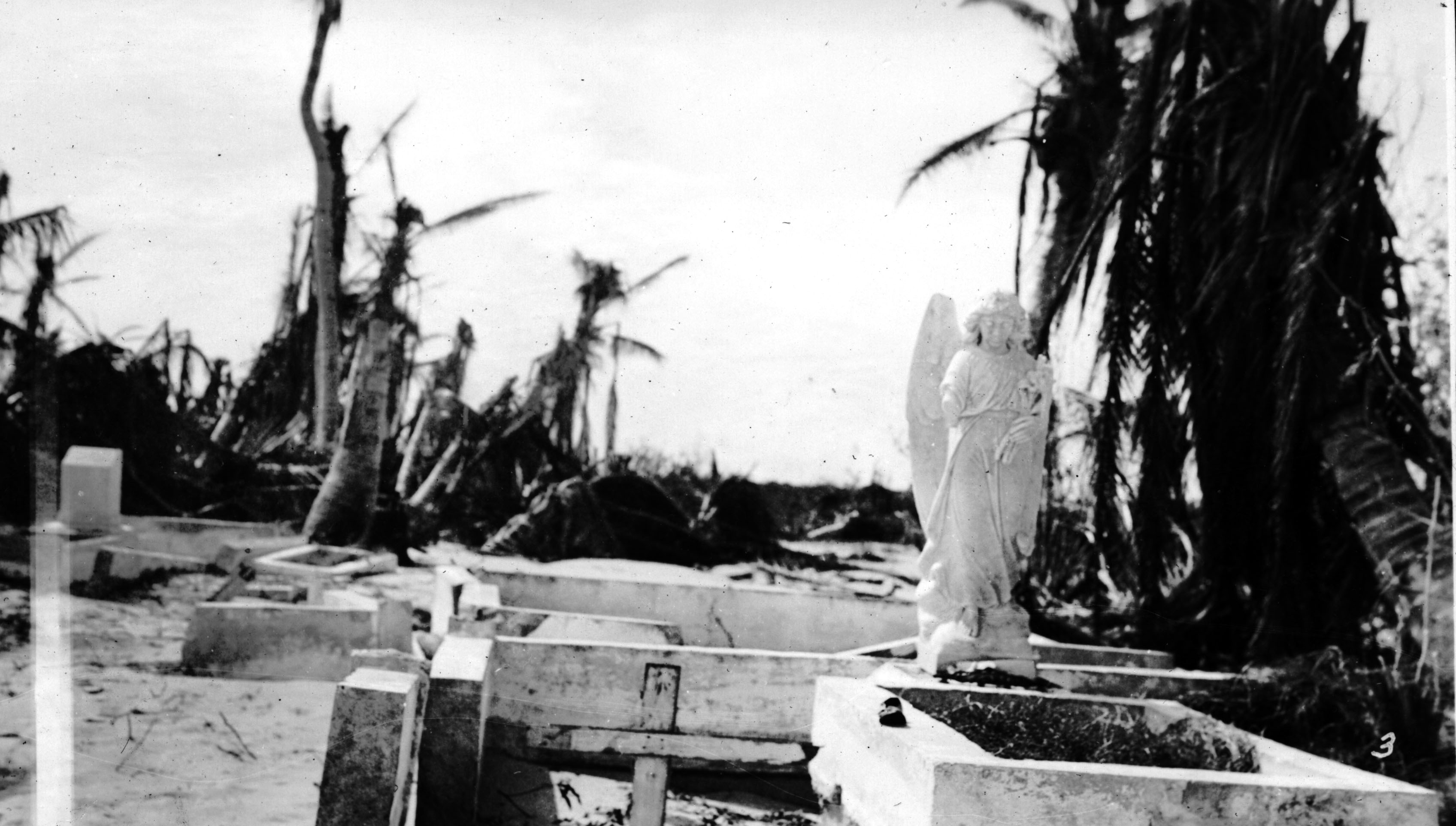
Church destroyed at Islamorada

Improved weather conditions on Wednesday, September 4, permitted the evacuation of survivors to begin. Participation of the rescue included American Red Cross, Florida National Guard, Federal Emergency Relief Administration (FERA), Works Progress Administration (WPA), Civilian Conservation Corps (CCC), United States Coast Guard, American Legion, Veterans of Foreign Wars, Dade County Undertakers Association, Dade County Medical Society, city and county officials, and numerous individuals, including Ernest Hemingway. Headquarters of the operation was the near shore of Snake Creek on Plantation Key. With the bridge over the creek washed out, this was the farthest point south on the highway. On September 5, at a meeting of all public and private agencies involved, Governor David Sholtz placed the sheriffs of Monroe and Dade Counties in overall control.

On the evening of September 4, 1935, Brigadier General Frank T. Hines, VA Administrator, received a phone call from Hyde Park, New York. It was Stephen Early, the President's press secretary. He had orders from the President, who was very distressed by the news from Florida. The VA was to: 1. Cooperate with FERA in seeing that everything possible be done for those injured in the hurricane; 2. See that the bodies were properly cared for shipment home to relatives, and that those bodies for which shipment home was not requested be sent to Arlington National Cemetery; and 3. Conduct a very careful joint investigation with Mr. Hopkins' organization, to determine whether there was any fault that would lie against anyone in the Administration. Hines's representative in Florida was to take full charge of the situation, and all other organizations and agencies were ordered to cooperate.

The President's first order was straightforward and promptly executed. 124 injured veterans were treated in Miami area hospitals; 9 of these died, and 56 were later transferred to VA medical facilities. Uninjured veterans were removed to Camp Foster in Jacksonville and evaluated for transfer to the CCC; those declining transfer or deemed unemployable were paid off and given tickets home. All of the FERA transient camps were closed in November 1935. In December 1935 FERA itself was absorbed within the new WPA, also directed by Hopkins.

==== Recovery ====
The second and third orders, however, were almost immediately compromised. At a news conference on September 5, Hopkins asserted that there was no negligence traceable to FERA in the failed evacuation of the camps, as the Weather Bureau advisories had given insufficient warning. He also dispatched his assistant, Aubrey Willis Williams, to Florida to coordinate FERA efforts and to investigate the deaths. Williams and Hines' assistant, Colonel George E. Ijams, both arrived in Miami on September 6. Ijams concentrated on the dead, their collection, identification, and proper disposition. This was to prove exceptionally difficult. Bodies were scattered throughout the Keys, and their rapid decomposition created ghastly conditions. State and local health officials demanded a ban on all movement of bodies and their immediate burial or cremation in place; the next day Governor Sholtz so ordered. This was reluctantly agreed to by Hines with the understanding that those buried would be later disinterred and shipped home or to Arlington when permitted by the State health authorities.

The cremations began on Saturday, September 7; 38 bodies were burned together at the collection point beside Snake Creek. Over the next week, 136 bodies were cremated on Upper Matecumbe Key at 12 different locations. On Lower Matecumbe Key, 82 were burned at 20 sites. On numerous small keys in Florida Bay, bodies were either burned or buried where found. This effort continued into November. 123 bodies had been transported to Miami before the embargo. These were processed at a temporary morgue staffed by fingerprint experts and 8 volunteer undertakers under tents at Woodlawn Park Cemetery. The intention was to identify the remains and prepare them for burial or shipment. With the embargo in force, immediate burial of all the bodies at Woodlawn was mandatory. FERA purchased a plot in Section 2A. The VA coordinated the ceremony with full military honors on September 8. 109 bodies were buried in the FERA plot: 81 veterans, nine civilians, and 19 unidentified bodies.

The Florida Emergency Relief Administration reported that as of November 19, 1935, 423 people died: 259 veterans and 164 civilians. By March 1, 1936, 62 additional bodies had been recovered, bringing the total to 485: 257 veterans and 228 civilians. The discrepancy in veterans' deaths resulted from the difficulty in identifying bodies, particularly those found months after the hurricane, and a question of definition; whether to count just those on the camp payrolls or to include others, not enrolled, who happened to be veterans.

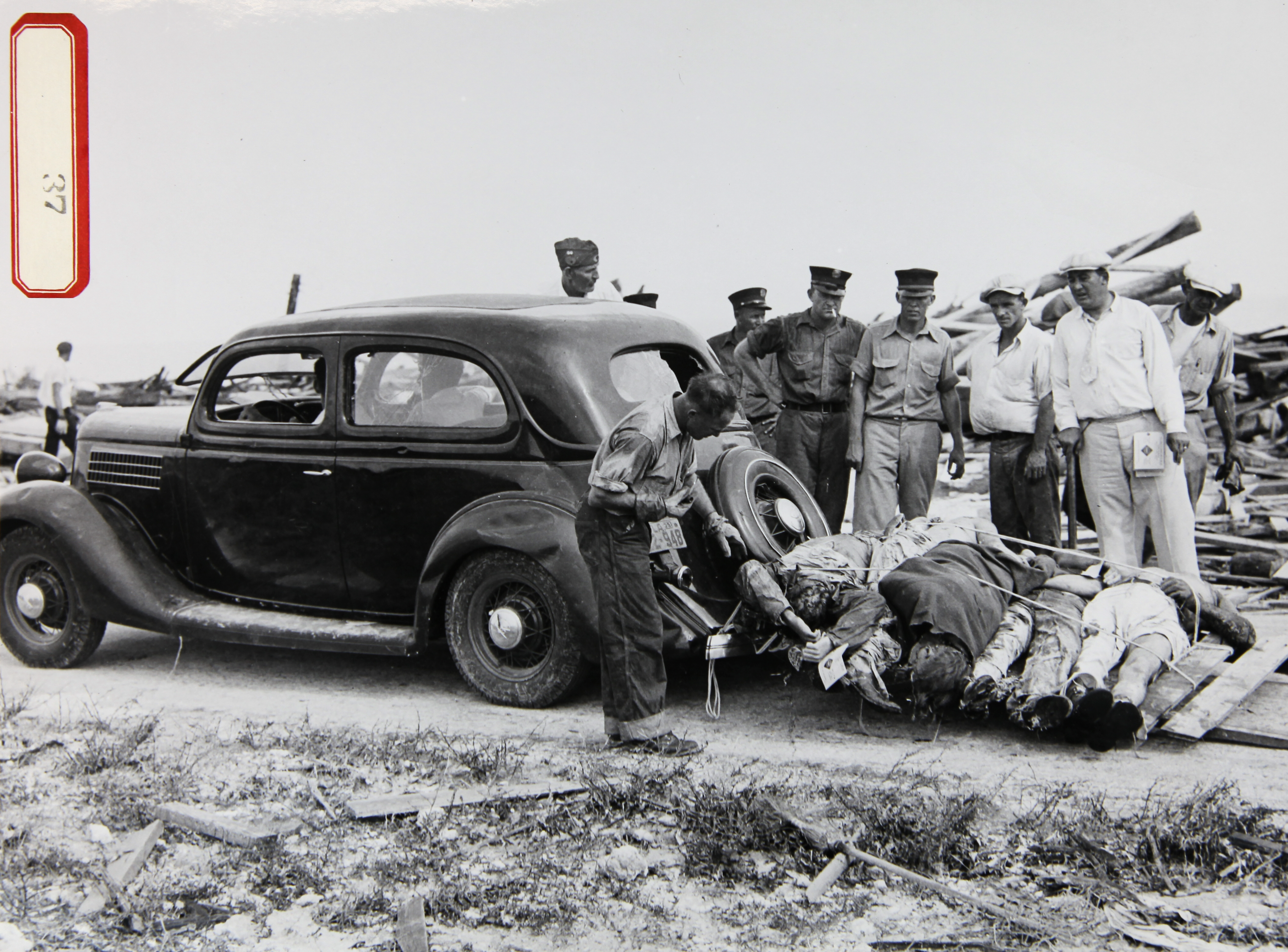
Collection of hurricane victims

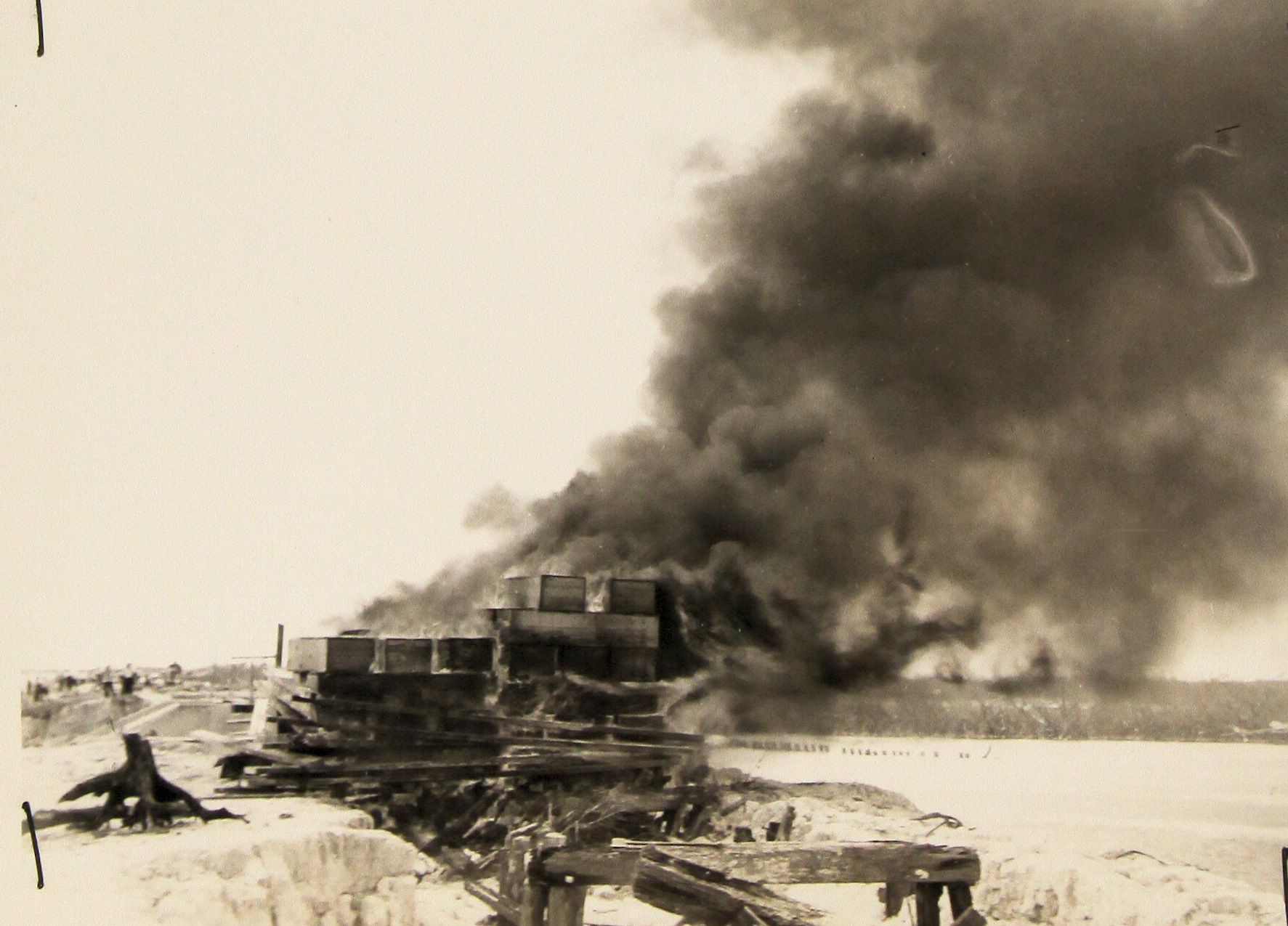
September 7, 1935, Cremation of hurricane victims, Snake Creek

The Veterans' Affairs Administration (VA) compiled its list of veterans' deaths: 121 dead-positive identifications, 90 missing, and 45 dead-identification tentative - totaling 256. Five others are named in a footnote. One was a misidentification of a previously listed veteran; two were state employees working at the camps, and two were unaffiliated veterans caught in the storm. This gave a total of 260 veterans. Adding this to the Florida Emergency Relief Administration number for civilians gave a total of 488 deaths, 12 of the dead were listed as "colored".

Ernest Hemingway visited the veterans' camp by boat after weathering the hurricane at his home in Key West; he wrote about the devastation in a critical article titled "Who Killed the Vets?" for The New Masses magazine. Hemingway implied that the FERA workers and families, unfamiliar with the risks of Florida's hurricane season, were unwitting victims of a system that appeared to care little for their welfare.

In the same issue of The New Masses appeared an editorial charging criminal negligence and a cartoon by Russell T. Limbach, captioned An Act of God, depicting burning corpses.

A The Washington Post editorial on September 5, titled Ruin in the Veterans' Camps, stated the widely held opinion that the:

camps were havens of rest designed to keep Bonus Marchers away from Washington ... Most of these veterans are drifters, psychopathic cases or habitual troublemakers ... Those who are nor physically or mentally handicapped have no claim whatsoever to special rewards in return for bonus agitation

"An Act of God", by Russell T. Limbach

==== Investigation ====
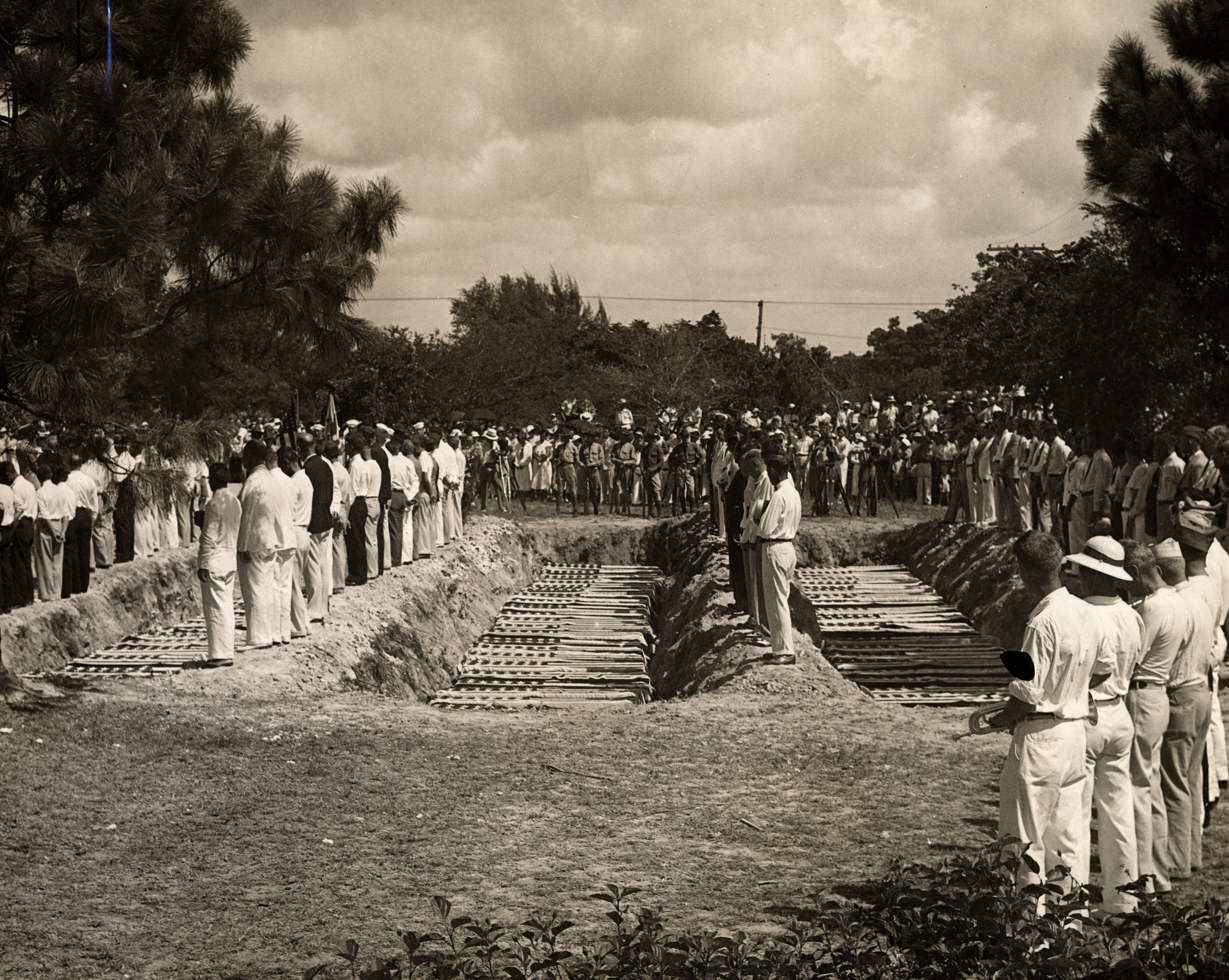
September 8, 1935, Mass burial at Woodlawn Park Cemetery

Williams completed his investigation on Sunday, September 8, when a memorial service and mass burial of hurricane victims (both coordinated by Ijams) were held in Miami. Ijams signed the 15 page report to the President. That night Williams released it to the Miami press in a radio broadcast immediately following the memorial ceremony. Ijams considered the timing unfortunate after receiving several critical telephone messages. The report exonerated everyone involved and concluded: "To our mind the catastrophe must be characterized as an act of God and was by its very nature beyond the power of man or instruments at his disposal to foresee sufficiently far enough in advance to permit the taking of adequate precautions capable of preventing the death and desolation which occurred". Early also found the publicity around the report "unfortunate". In a telegram to his colleague, assistant Presidential secretary Marvin H. McIntyre, Early wrote that he had authorized Hines to proceed with a "complete and exhaustive" joint investigation with Hopkins. Significantly Hines was to "instruct his investigator that under no circumstances will any statement be made to the Press until final report has been submitted to the President". Hopkins gave similar instructions to his investigator. McIntyre was also involved in damage control. On September 10, 1935, the Greater Miami Ministerial Association wrote the President an angry letter labeling the report a "whitewash". McIntyre forwarded it to FERA for a response. Williams returned a draft for the President's signature on September 25 insisting the report was only preliminary and that the "final and detailed report ... will be both thorough and searching".

Williams assigned John Abt, assistant general counsel for FERA, to complete the investigation. On September 11, 1935, Hines directed David W. Kennamer to investigate the disaster. Abt felt a further investigation was unnecessary. Working with Harry W. Farmer, another VA investigator, Kennamer completed his 2 volume report on October 30, 1935. Farmer added a third volume concerning the identification of the veterans. Kennamer's report included 2,168 pages of exhibits, 118 pages of findings, and a 19-page general comment. His findings differed substantially from those of Williams, citing three officials of the Florida Emergency Relief Administration as negligent (Administrator Conrad Van Hyning, Asst. Administrator Fred Ghent and Camp Superintendent Ray Sheldon). In a response to Abt's draft report to the President, Ijams sided with Kennamer. Hines and Hopkins never agreed on a final report, and Kennamer's findings were suppressed. They remained so for decades.

On November 1, 1935, the American Legion completed its own report on the hurricane. The Legion's National Commander, Ray Murphy, concluded that:

the blame for the loss of life can be placed on "Inefficiency, Indifference, and Ignorance". Inefficiency in the setup of the camps. Indifference of someone in charge as to the safety of the men. Ignorance of the real danger from a tropical hurricane. And these "I's" can be added together and they spell "Murder at Matacombe" [sic].

[The] committee early in its investigation noticed a tendency on the part of some to reflect on the character of the men who were veterans in the camps. Several parties referred to them as "bums," "drunkards," "crazy men," "riff-raff" and the like. They seem to think that "they got what was coming to them".

How anyone could arrive at such a conclusion is impossible for us to determine.

If these men were "bums," "drunkards," "crazy men" etc. then it was all the more necessary that every precaution be taken to protect them. If they fell into this category they were subnormal men and should have been treated as such. If they were incapable of caring for themselves then the government should have placed them in hospitals and not have sent them to a wilderness in the high-seas on a so called "rehabilitation program".

Others testified that the men were well-behaved and that a great majority of them would have preferred to have been placed under military discipline in the camps. But these observations are of no real value except to show that some people are trying to "cover up" the real guilt of responsible parties.

=== Memorials ===
==== Islamorada ====
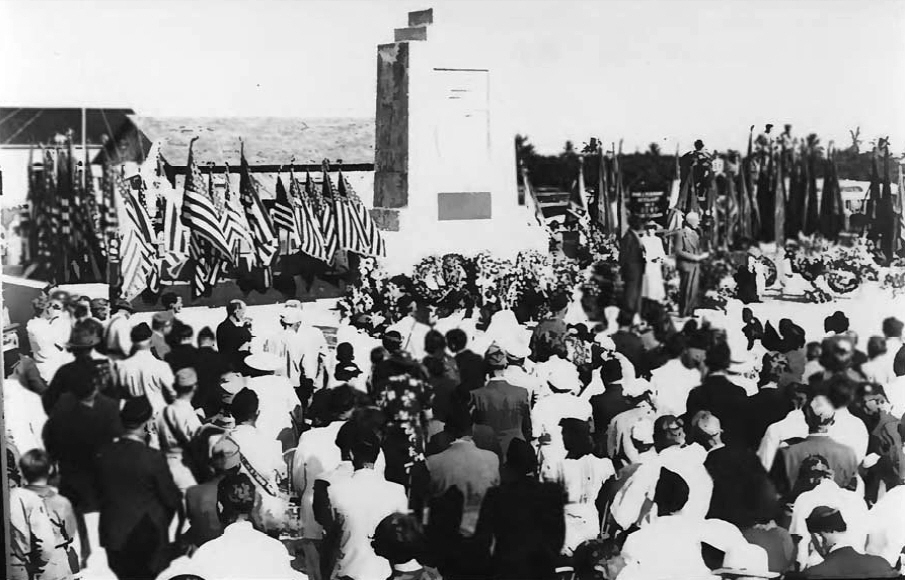
Dedication of Florida Keys Memorial, November 14, 1937

There is a monument in Islamorada, near where Islamorada's post office stood, on U.S. 1. The memorial was designed by the Florida Division of the Federal Art Project and constructed using Keys limestone ("keystone") by the Works Progress Administration. It was unveiled on November 14, 1937, with several hundred people attending. President Roosevelt sent a telegram to the dedication in which he expressed "heartfelt sympathy" and said, "the disaster which made desolate the hearts of so many of our people brought a personal sorrow to me because some years ago I knew many residents of the keys". The welcoming committee included Key West Mayor Willard M. Albury, and other local officials. Hines had been invited to speak but he declined. In a letter to Williams on June 24, 1937, regarding what to do with the many skeletons of veterans recently discovered in the Keys, he wrote: "It occurs to me that if a large memorial is erected adjacent to this highway at the place of the disaster it will be observed by all persons using the highway and will serve as a constant reminder of the unfortunate catastrophe which occurred." Hines recommended the remains be buried at Woodlawn. A frieze depicts palm trees amid curling waves, fronds bent in the wind. In front of the sculpture, a ceramic-tile mural of the Keys covers a stone crypt that holds the ashes of victims from makeshift funeral pyres.

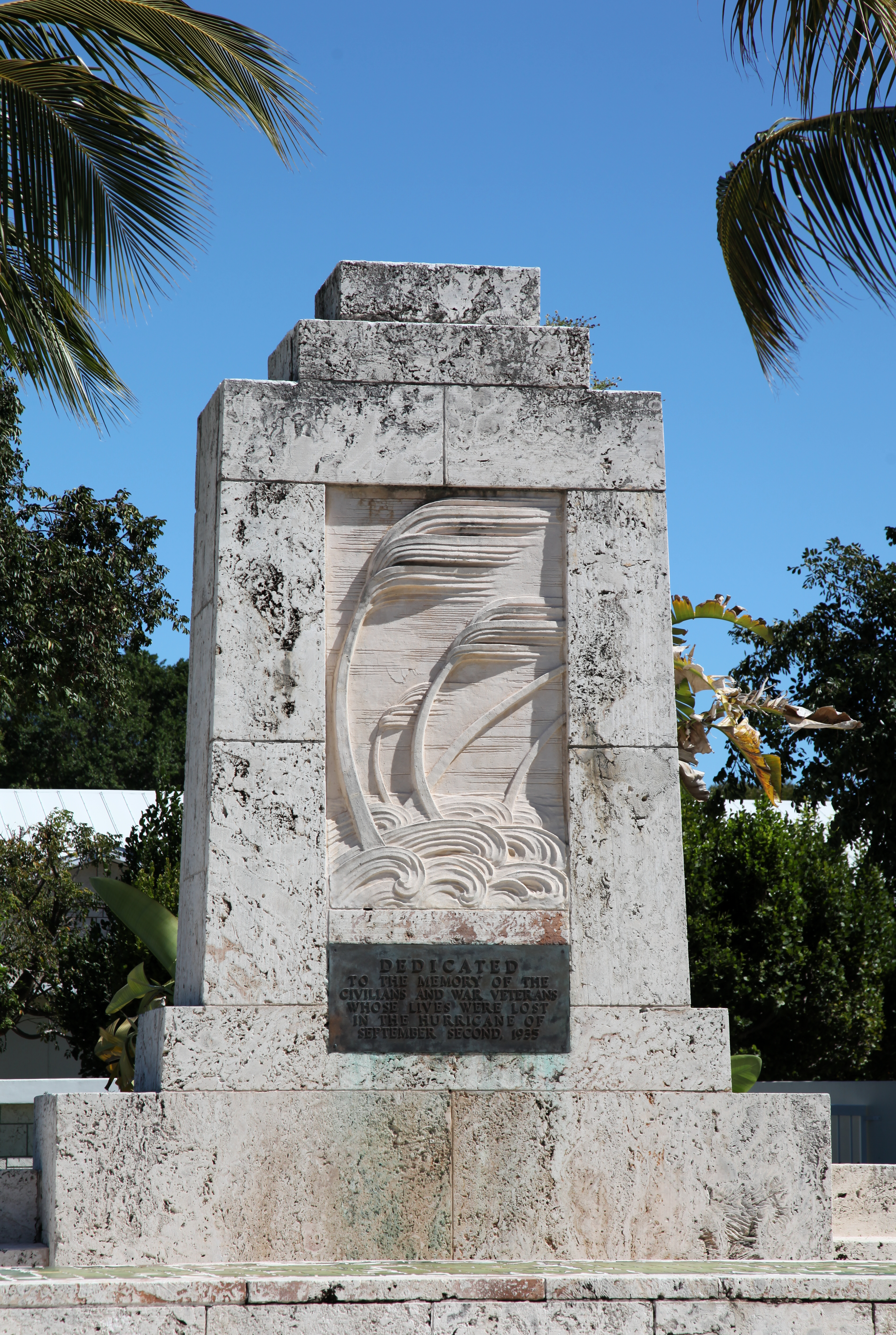
Relief and dedication

The memorial was added to the U.S. National Register of Historic Places on March 16, 1995. Local residents hold ceremonies at the monument every year on Labor Day and on Memorial Day to honor the veterans and the civilians.

==== Woodlawn Park North Cemetery ====
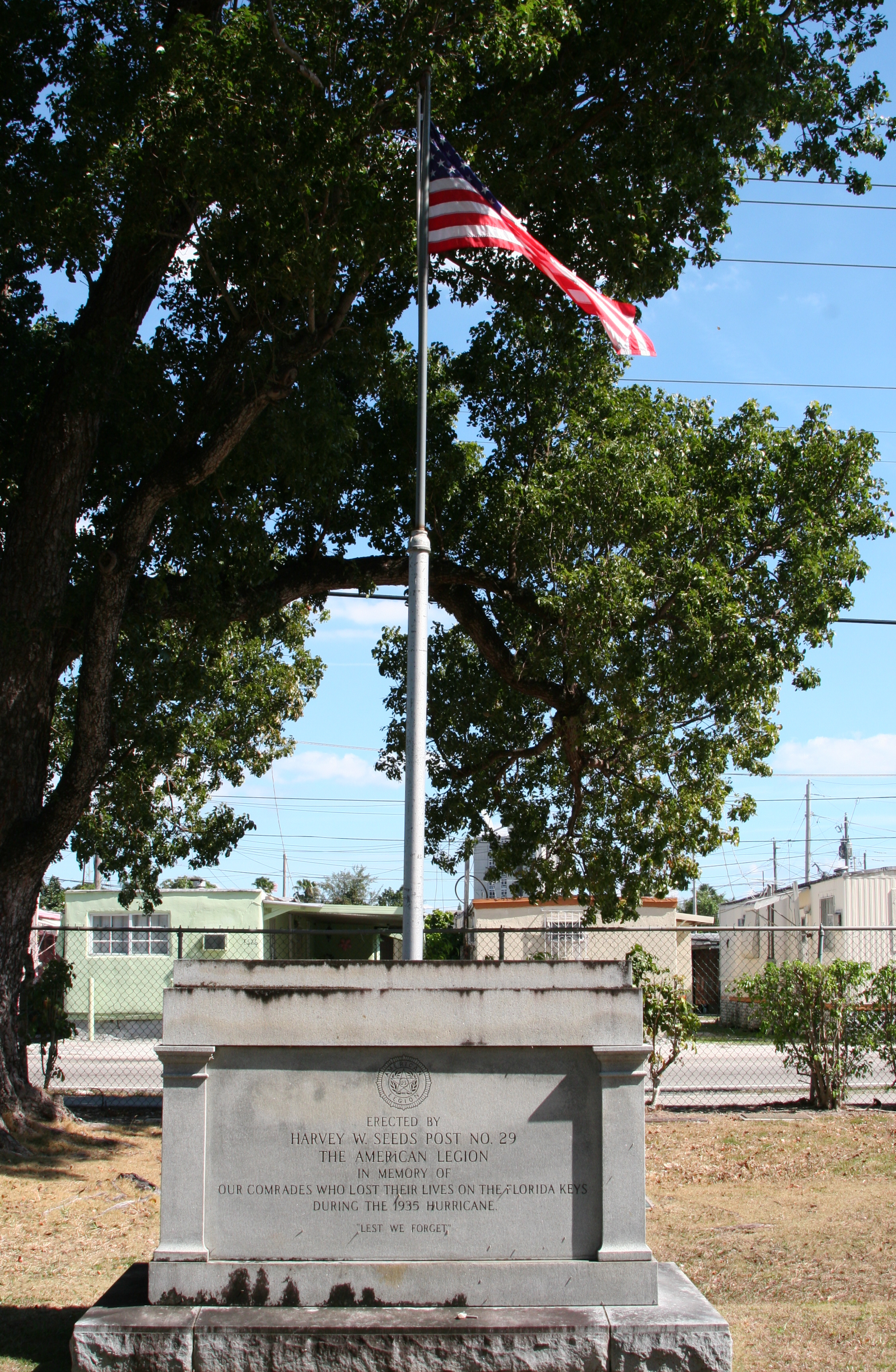
Hurricane Monument, Woodlawn Park North Cemetery, Miami, FL, on site of mass grave

On January 31, 1936, Harvey W. Seeds Post No. 29, American Legion, Miami, Florida, petitioned FERA for the deed to the Woodlawn plot. The Legion would use the empty grave sites for the burial of indigent veterans and accept responsibility for care of the plot. The State of Florida approved the title transfer.

==== Veterans Key ====
On February 27, 2006, the U.S. Board on Geographic Names approved a proposal by Jerry Wilkinson, the president of the Historical Preservation Society of the Upper Keys, to name a small island off the southern tip of Lower Matecumbe Key for the veterans who died in the hurricane. It is near where Camp #3 was located. Veterans Key and several concrete pilings are all that remain of the 1935 bridge construction project.

==== Department of Veterans Affairs Actions ====
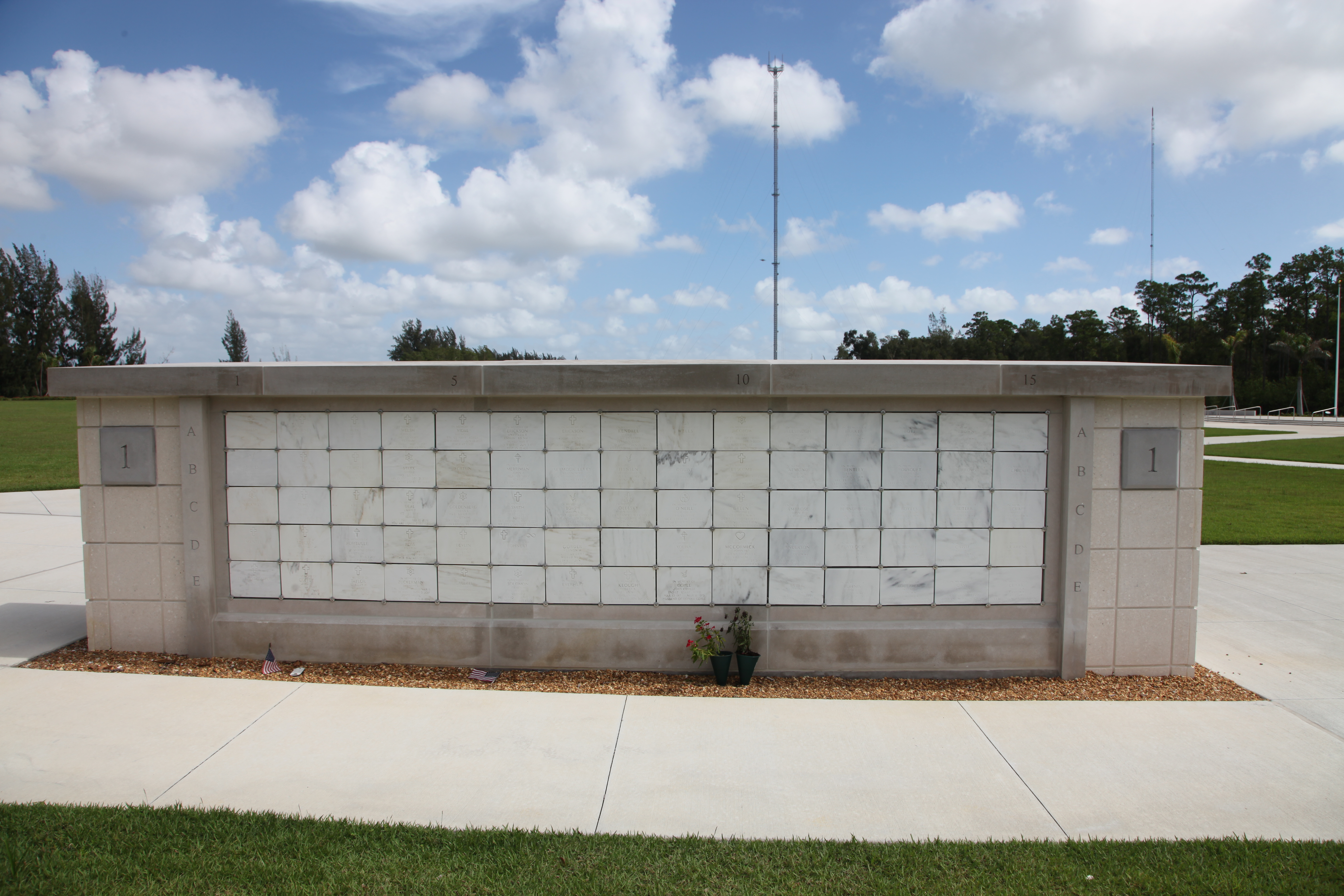
Memorial markers for veterans lost in 1935 Hurricane at South Florida National Cemetery

Government-furnished headstones and grave markers are provided for eligible veterans buried in National Cemeteries, State veterans cemeteries, and private cemeteries. Memorial markers are also provided when remains are unavailable for burial. Under a 2009 VA regulation, the applicant in all cases was defined as the veteran's next of kin. Prior to the 2009 rule any person with knowledge of the veteran could apply. When enforcement began in 2012, many groups and volunteers objected. They had worked for decades in cooperation with the VA to mark unmarked veterans' graves, many from the Civil War era. They argued that the next-of-kin (if any) was often impossible to locate and that the very existence of an unmarked grave was evidence of the family's indifference. Two bills were introduced in Congress, H. R. 2018 and S. 2700 which would have again allowed unrelated applicants. Both bills died in committee. On October 1, 2014, the VA proposed a rule change which would include unrelated individuals in the categories of applicants . The revision became effective on March 2, 2016. It added several categories of applicants unrelated to the veteran for headstones and grave markers; however, it retained the family member only restriction on memorial markers. This provision was challenged in an appeal to the United States Court of Appeals for Veterans Claims. The case was argued on January 14, 2021, and decided on February 28, 2022. The court ruled that the restriction was arbitrary and capricious, that it be set aside and remanded for further development. The VA appealed the ruling to the United States Court of Appeals for the Federal Circuit, but filed a joint stipulation of voluntary dismissal on April 24, 2024. Memorial markers for 166 veterans lost in the Labor Day Hurricane were placed at South Florida National Cemetery in 2023.

== See also ==
- List of Atlantic hurricane records
- List of Category 5 Atlantic hurricanes
