= WKEZ =

WKEZ may refer to:

- WKEZ (AM), a radio station (1240 AM) licensed to Bluefield, West Virginia
- WKEZ-FM, a radio station (96.9 FM) licensed to Tavernier, Florida
