= WPIK =

Radio station in Summerland Key, Florida

- Summerland Key, Florida; United States
- Broadcast area: Florida Keys area
- Frequency: 102.5 MHz
- Branding: Keys Talk 96.9/102.5

Programming
- Format: Conservative talk (WKEZ-FM simulcast)
- Affiliations: Premiere Networks; Westwood One; Compass Media Networks

Ownership
- Owner: Michael Stapleford; (Magnum Broadcasting, Inc.)
- Sister stations: WGAY, WKEZ-FM

Technical information
- Licensing authority: FCC
- Facility ID: 73880
- Class: C2
- ERP: 50,000 watts
- HAAT: 126 meters
- Transmitter coordinates: 24°40′35.00″N 81°30′41.00″W
- Repeater: WKEZ-FM (96.9 MHz Tavernier)

Links
- Public license information: Public file; LMS

WPIK (102.5 FM) is a radio station licensed to Summerland Key, Florida, United States. The station serves the Florida Keys area. The station is currently owned by Magnum Broadcasting, Inc.

On September 29, 2020, WPIK returned to the air with conservative talk, branded as "Keys Talk 96.9/102.5", simulcasting WKEZ-FM 96.9 Tavernier.
