= WFFG (AM) =

Radio station in Marathon, Florida

Coordinates: 24°41′28″N 81°06′30″W

- Marathon, Florida; United States
- Frequency: 1300 kHz

Programming
- Format: News/talk

Ownership
- Owner: Joseph P. Nascone; (The Great Marathon Radio Company)

History
- First air date: 1960

Technical information
- Licensing authority: FCC
- Facility ID: 65664
- Class: B
- Power: 2,500 watts unlimited

Links
- Public license information: Public file; LMS

WFFG (1300 AM) is an American radio station licensed to operate in Marathon, Florida, United States, in the Florida Keys, broadcasting a news/talk format.

== History ==
First licensed in 1960, the station was a 500-watt, four-tower directional station built on an uninhabited island in the Florida Keys. Telephone and electrical services were run to the island, exclusively for the station. A drawbridge was built for convenient transportation.

The original owners were Kentucky broadcasters, Bill Betts and Gilmore Nunn, who vacationed in Marathon. In the early 1960s they sold the station to Kentucky financier Garvis Kincaid where it became part of the Bluegrass Broadcasting chain, headquartered in Lexington, Kentucky.

Bluegrass sold the station to a former Michigan legislator and local resident, Emil Lockwood. Lockwood retained the station for less than three years before selling to competitors, the Thacker family, who then owned WMUM, a music station in Marathon.

The Thackers upgraded the station to 2,500 watts with a two tower directional signal. They sold both the AM and FM stations to Joe Nascone, a local resident formerly from Pennsylvania.

While the FCC database states that the station's transmitter tower is located on Boot Key, as well as the transmitter for Radio Marti. Radio Marti is actually on Sister's Creek Island, adjacent to Boot Key and inside the Marathon City limits.

As of July 2007, the station's programming consists of news/talk, including syndicated programming of Rush Limbaugh, Sean Hannity, G. Gordon Liddy and Bill O'Reilly.

The station was most recently owned by Jonathan Smith's Choice Radio Keys Corporation. Due to an inability to pay outstanding debts, the company assigned the licenses of WFFG and sister stations WGMX, WKEY-FM, and WKEZ-FM to a trustee on June 4, 2018, to be sold for the benefit of creditors. A sale of WFFG and WGMX to Joseph Nascone's The Great Marathon Radio Company was consummated on September 14, 2020, at a price of $35,000.
