= Leise Maersk (1921) =

Diesel-powered cargo ship

Coordinates: 55.500000°N 11.000000°W

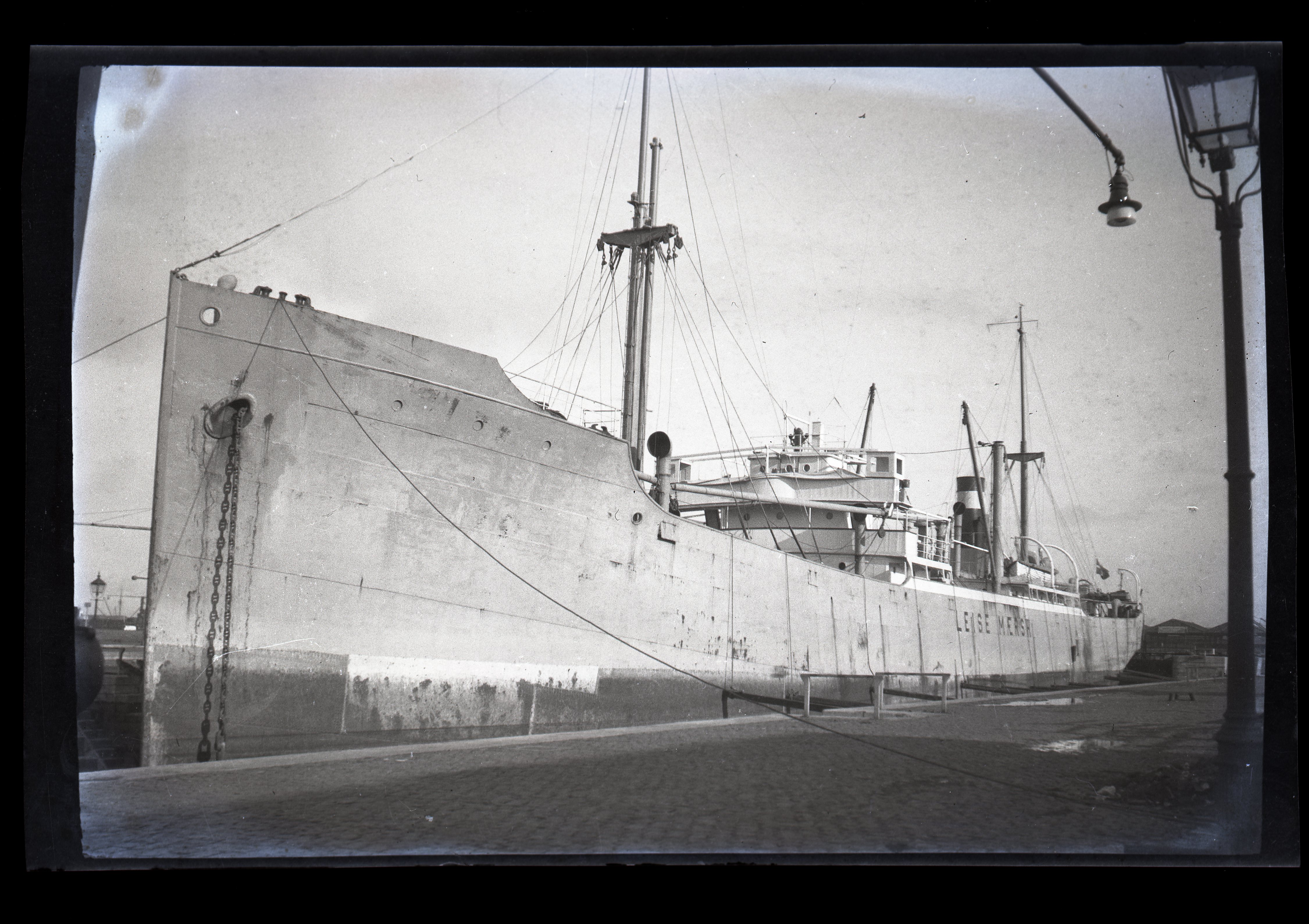

History
- Name: Leise Maersk
- Operator: Maersk Line (1921 to 1939) United Kingdom (1940)
- Route: US East Coast–Japan
- Builder: Odense Steel Shipyard
- Launched: 12 February 1921
- Christened
- Completed: August 1921
- Identification: Call sign: NCWP
- Fate: Sunk on 23 November 1940

General characteristics
- Type: Cargo ship
- Tonnage: 2,925 GRT; 1,748 NRT
- Length: 302.2 ft (92.1 m)
- Beam: 44.2 ft (13.5 m)
- Draught: 26.2 ft (8.0 m)
- Installed power: 1,500 hp (1,100 kW)

Leise Maersk was a diesel-powered cargo ship, which made the first voyage for the Maersk Line.

== Construction and modifications ==
Leise Maersk was built in 1921 in the Odense Steel Shipyard and was the first diesel-powered vessel in the Maersk fleet. She was lengthened in 1932 by 18 feet (5.5 metres) from her original 302.2 feet (92.1 metres) to 320.2 feet (97.6 metres).

== Specifications ==
Leise Maersk had a long stroke four-cycle diesel engine generating 1,500 indicated horsepower (1,100 kW), which translated to 1,150 shp (860 kW) at 85 rpm, turning a single screw.

== Career ==
=== Early career ===
The ship's first captain was C Thygesen.

=== Armenia aid ===
In 1922, the ship bought donated relief goods for Armenians from New York to Constantinople, including an entire ambulance train, 11 tractors, four trucks and various farm machinery and implements.

=== Maersk Line service ===
The Maersk Line was established in Maersk's New York office as an agreement was make with the Ford Motor Company to transport car parts from North American factories to assembly plants in Japan. As a result, starting on 12 July 1928 Leise Maersk made a voyage from Baltimore to New York and Savannah before passing through the Panama Canal after which the ship called at San Pedro and Los Angeles. She then crossed the Pacific Ocean, arriving at Yokohama on 10 September before continuing to Manila and Iloilo.

=== Labor Day hurricane ===
On 2 September 1935 Leise Maersk was near Florida when the Labor Day hurricane struck the area. The force of the hurricane lifted the ship over Alligator Reef, she was grounded 4 miles (6.4 km) away. There was no loss of life and she was salvaged on 20 September 1935.

=== World War II ===
In 1940, Leise Maersk was transferred to the Ministry of War Transport and participated in North Atlantic convoys. In 1940 she sailed out from Sydney, Nova Scotia, Canada, carrying 4,500 tons of grain and general cargo to Sharpness as part of convoy SC 11. On 23 November, she was torpedoed by the Kriegsmarine submarine U-100 and sunk west of the Outer Hebrides. Seventeen of her 24-man crew were lost, with the survivors being rescued by a Dutch salvage tug and taken to Campbeltown.
