= WKEZ-FM =

- Tavernier, Florida; United States
- Broadcast area: Florida Keys
- Frequency: 96.9 MHz
- Branding: Keys Talk 96.9/102.5

Programming
- Format: Conservative talk
- Affiliations: Premiere Networks; Westwood One; Compass Media Networks

Ownership
- Owner: Michael Stapleford; (Magnum Broadcasting, Inc.)
- Sister stations: WGAY, WPIK

History
- First air date: November 21, 1997 (as WIFL)
- Former call signs: WIFL (1997–1999)
- Call sign meaning: Florida Keys EaZy Listening (previous format)

Technical information
- Licensing authority: FCC
- Facility ID: 34351
- Class: C3
- ERP: 25,000 watts
- HAAT: 68 meters (223 ft)
- Transmitter coordinates: 25°1′35.00″N 80°30′30.00″W
- Repeaters: WPIK (102.5 MHz, Summerland Key)

Links
- Public license information: Public file; LMS

WKEZ-FM (96.9 FM) is a commercial radio station broadcasting a conservative talk radio format, known as "Keys Talk 96.9/102.5." Licensed to Tavernier, Florida, the station serves the Florida Keys. The station is owned by Magnum Broadcasting, which also owns 105.7 WGAY in Sugarloaf Key.

The station airs a local news block in morning drive time, followed by nationally syndicated shows from Glenn Beck, Rush Limbaugh, Sean Hannity, Mark Levin, Buck Sexton, Coast to Coast AM with George Noory and This Morning, America's First News with Gordon Deal.

WKEZ-FM has an effective radiated power (ERP) of 25,000 watts. The transmitter is on Wellington Drive in Tavernier, off U.S. Route 1. Programming is also heard on 102.5 MHz.

== History ==
The station signed on the air as WIFL on November 21, 1997. On May 6, 1999, the station changed its call sign to the current WKEZ-FM. The EZ in the call letters referred to the station's easy listening format and the K stood for Keys.

On June 8, WKEZ-FM changed its format from easy listening to oldies, branded as "True Oldies".

On April 1, 2017, WKEZ-FM changed its format from oldies to classic hits, branded as "Mix 96.9". (info taken from stationintel.com)

The station was most recently owned by Jonathan Smith's Choice Radio Keys Corporation. Due to an inability to pay outstanding debts, the company assigned the licenses of WGMX and sister stations WFFG, WGMX, and WKEY-FM to a trustee on June 4, 2018, to be sold for the benefit of creditors. Effective July 27, 2020, WKEZ-FM was sold to Magnum Broadcasting, Inc. for $100,000.

On September 29, 2020, WKEZ-FM dropped its simulcast with WGMX and changed its format to conservative talk, branded as "Keys Talk 96.9/102.5" in a simulcast with WPIK.
