= WKEY-FM =

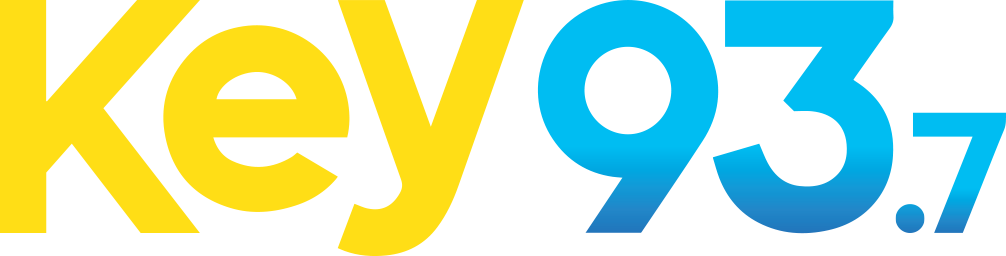
- Key West, Florida; United States
- Broadcast area: Key West and Lower Florida Keys
- Frequency: 93.7 MHz
- Branding: Key 93.7

Programming
- Format: Yacht rock

Ownership
- Owner: Magnum Broadcasting, Inc.

History
- First air date: November 17, 1985; 40 years ago
- Former call signs: WKRY (1985–1999)
- Former frequencies: 93.5 MHz
- Call sign meaning: Key West

Technical information
- Licensing authority: FCC
- Facility ID: 34354
- Class: C3
- ERP: 6,100 watts
- HAAT: 43 meters (141 ft)
- Transmitter coordinates: 24°34′19″N 81°44′24″W

Links
- Public license information: Public file; LMS
- Webcast: Listen Live
- Website: key937radio.com

WKEY-FM (93.7 MHz) is a radio station located in Key West, Florida, United States. It is owned by William Ostrander through licensee Radio One Key West, LLC., with advertising sales and station broadcast operations conducted through a partnership with Magnum Broadcasting. WKEY broadcasts a yacht rock format known as "Key 93.7", they broadcast from studios and offices located on Front Street in Key West and transmitter facilities located on 1st Avenue in the unincorporated area of Stock Island.

== History ==
The station went on the air as WKRY on 93.5 MHz on November 17, 1985, with a beautiful music format. By 1989, it was an easy listening station with 20 hours of jazz music and 8 hours of classical music a week. On November 23, 1999, the station changed its call sign to the current WKEY-FM. On June 8, 2011, WKEY-FM changed formats to oldies, branded as "True Oldies". The station was moved to 93.7 MHz in 2013 as a contingency of relocating 104.3 MHz from West Palm Beach south toward the Miami market.

Jonathan Smith's Choice Radio Keys Corporation acquired the station in 2016. By that time, it was operating as part of a regional simulcast with WGMX and WKEZ-FM, known as "The Mix". The station then changed to classic hits as "Mix 93.7" on April 1, 2017. Due to an inability to pay outstanding debts, the company assigned the licenses of those stations and AM outlet WFFG to a trustee on June 4, 2018, to be sold for the benefit of creditors.

Effective November 4, 2020, the trustee sold WKEY-FM to Spottswood Partners II, Ltd., for $15,000 and the cancellation of a lease valued at $85,899. The station had been off the air since March 2020, with the trustee citing needed tower work. On January 8, 2021, WKEY-FM resumed broadcasting, branded as "93.7 NRG", a new non-stop dance and disco music format created by NRG Media of Florida, which leased the station from Spottswood.

WKEY was purchased by Radio One Key West, LLC—headed by Buffalo, New York, broadcaster William Ostrander, who goes by the name "Buddy Shula" and owns WECK serving that city—on October 1, 2022, for $301,000. On October 18, WKEY-FM‘s format changed from smooth jazz to "mellow rock", branded as "Key 93.7". Ostrander is in the process of selling WKEY to Magnum Broadcasting.

On February 6, 2026 William Ostrander and his Radio One Key West, LLC. completed the sale of WKEY-FM to Magnum Broadcasting which until the sale operated WKEY under a Local Marketing Agreement.

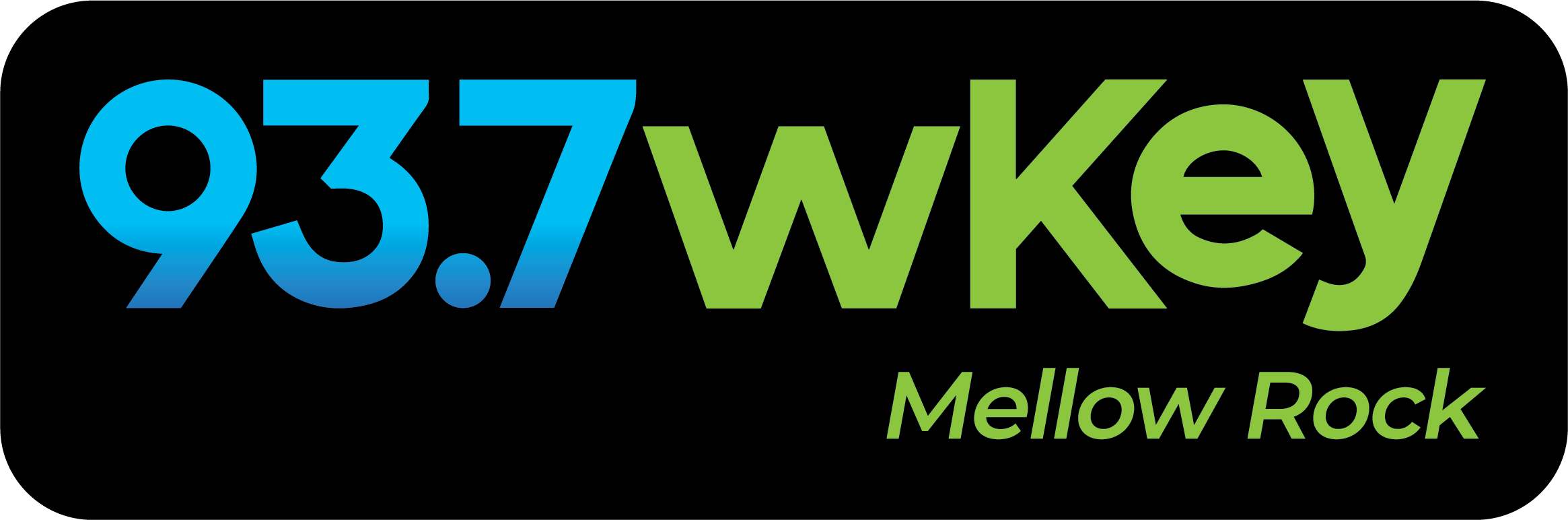
Former Logo
