= WGMX =

Radio station in Marathon, Florida

- Marathon, Florida; United States
- Frequency: 94.3 MHz

Programming
- Format: Silent

Ownership
- Owner: Joseph P. Nascone; (The Great Marathon Radio Company)
- Sister stations: WFFG

History
- First air date: 1976 (as WMUM)
- Former call signs: WMUM (1976–1990)

Technical information
- Licensing authority: FCC
- Facility ID: 65663
- Class: C2
- ERP: 26,500 watts
- HAAT: 84 meters (276 ft)
- Transmitter coordinates: 24°41′31.5″N 81°6′30.3″W

Links
- Public license information: Public file; LMS

WGMX (94.3 FM) is a radio station licensed to Marathon, Florida, United States.

== History ==
The station originally went on the air in 1976 as WMUM, Stereo Island, and was owned by John and June Thacker. It was a Class A FM station on 94.3 MHz and took the market by storm with its easy listening music format and limited commercial breaks, along with a fulltime local news department. The Thackers later bought local AM station, WFFG, and moved the FM operation to Boot Key, sharing studio and transmitter facilities.

The Thackers sold WMUM to Joe Nascone, who was from Pennsylvania and the call letters were changed to WGMX.

On June 8, 2011, WGMX changed its format from adult contemporary "Mix 94.3" to oldies, branded as "True Oldies".

On April 1, 2017, WGMX changed its format from oldies to classic hits, branded as "Mix 94.3".

The station was most recently owned by Jonathan Smith's Choice Radio Keys Corporation. Due to an inability to pay outstanding debts, the company assigned the licenses of WGMX and sister stations WFFG, WKEY-FM, and WKEZ-FM to a trustee on June 4, 2018, to be sold for the benefit of creditors. A sale of WGMX and WFFG to Joseph Nascone's The Great Marathon Radio Company was consummated on September 14, 2020, at a price of $35,000.
