= Boot Key =

Island in the middle Florida Keys, United States

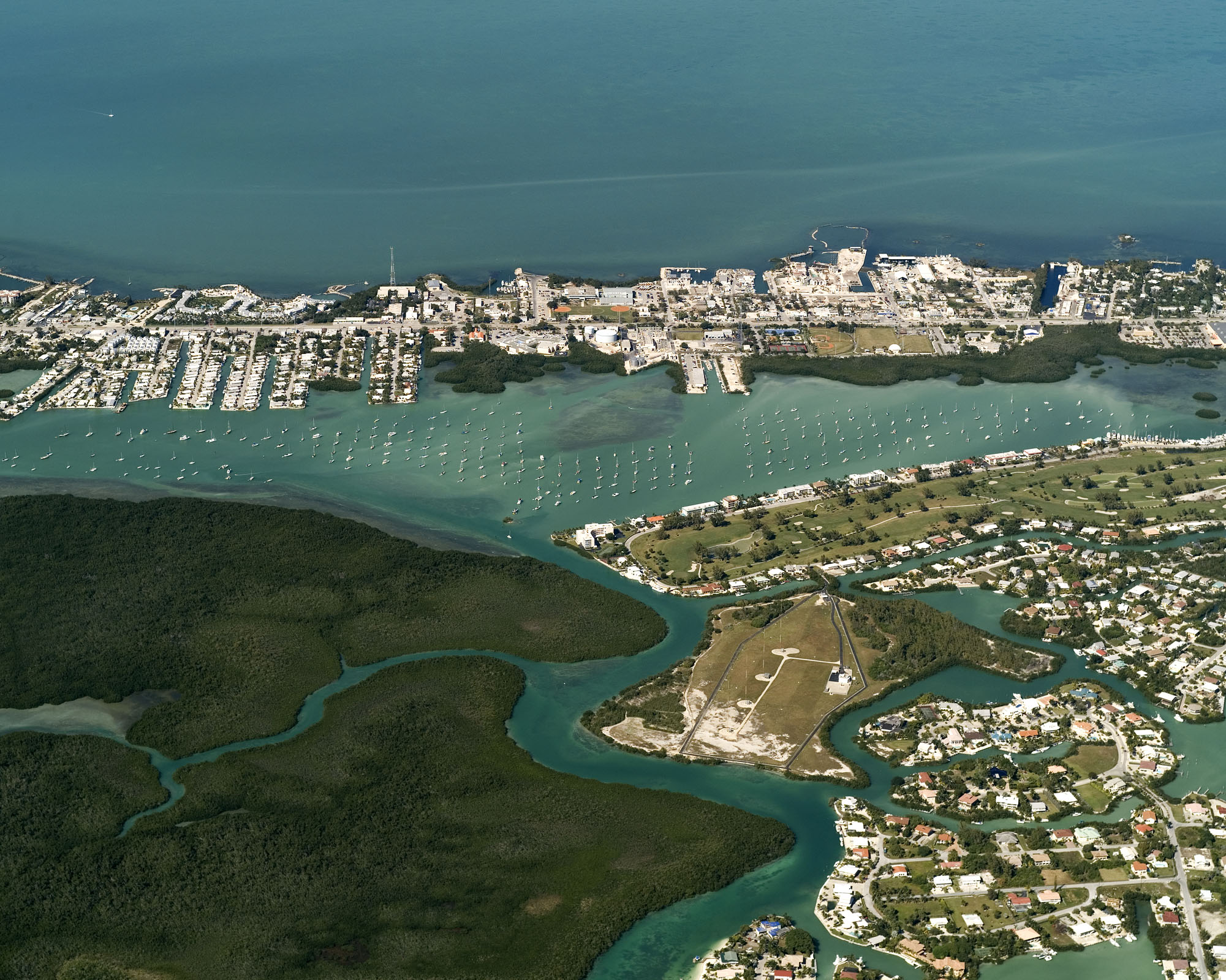
- Looking north over Boot Key Harbor

- Boot Key Boot Key (the Caribbean)

Geography
- Location: Gulf of Mexico
- Coordinates: 24.696°N 81.102°W
- Archipelago: Florida Keys
- Adjacent to: Florida Straits

Administration
- United States
- State: Florida
- County: Monroe

Boot Key is an island in the middle Florida Keys located adjacent to Key Vaca. Boot Key is within the city limits of Marathon, Florida, United States. The island is largely undeveloped. A draw bridge that once connected the island to Key Vaca was demolished by the city in 2010 after failing FDOT's inspection.

"Boot Key has been protected from development since 2011 by NOAA’s Coastal & Estuarine Land Conservation Program."

Immediately adjacent to Boot Key is a 38-acre (15 ha) tract of land from which the United States Government broadcasts Radio Marti. These broadcasts consist of anti-communist news and information directed towards residents of Cuba, in an attempt to support opposition against the Cuban government.

A hawk watch is conducted every fall on Boot Key.

== Education ==
It is in the Monroe County School District. It is zoned to Stanley Switick Elementary School (K-8) in Marathon.
