= WGAY (FM) =

Radio station in Sugarloaf Key, Florida, United States

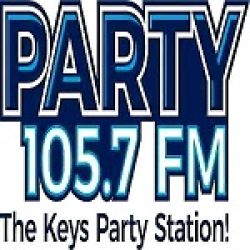
- Sugarloaf Key, Florida; United States
- Broadcast area: Key West
- Frequency: 105.7 MHz
- Branding: Party 105.7 FM

Programming
- Language: English
- Format: Dance radio
- Affiliations: Compass Media Networks

Ownership
- Owner: Magnum Radio

History
- First air date: July 1, 2018

Technical information
- Licensing authority: FCC
- Facility ID: 190443
- Class: C2
- ERP: 22,000 watts
- HAAT: 145 meters (476 ft)
- Transmitter coordinates: 24°40′37.05″N 81°30′38.03″W

Links
- Public license information: Public file; LMS
- Webcast: Listen live
- Website: thekeyspartystation.com

WGAY (105.7 MHz) is an FM radio station broadcasting a dance radio format. Licensed to Sugarloaf Key, Florida, the station serves the Florida Keys area. The station is currently owned by Magnum Radio.
