= Layton, Florida =

- City
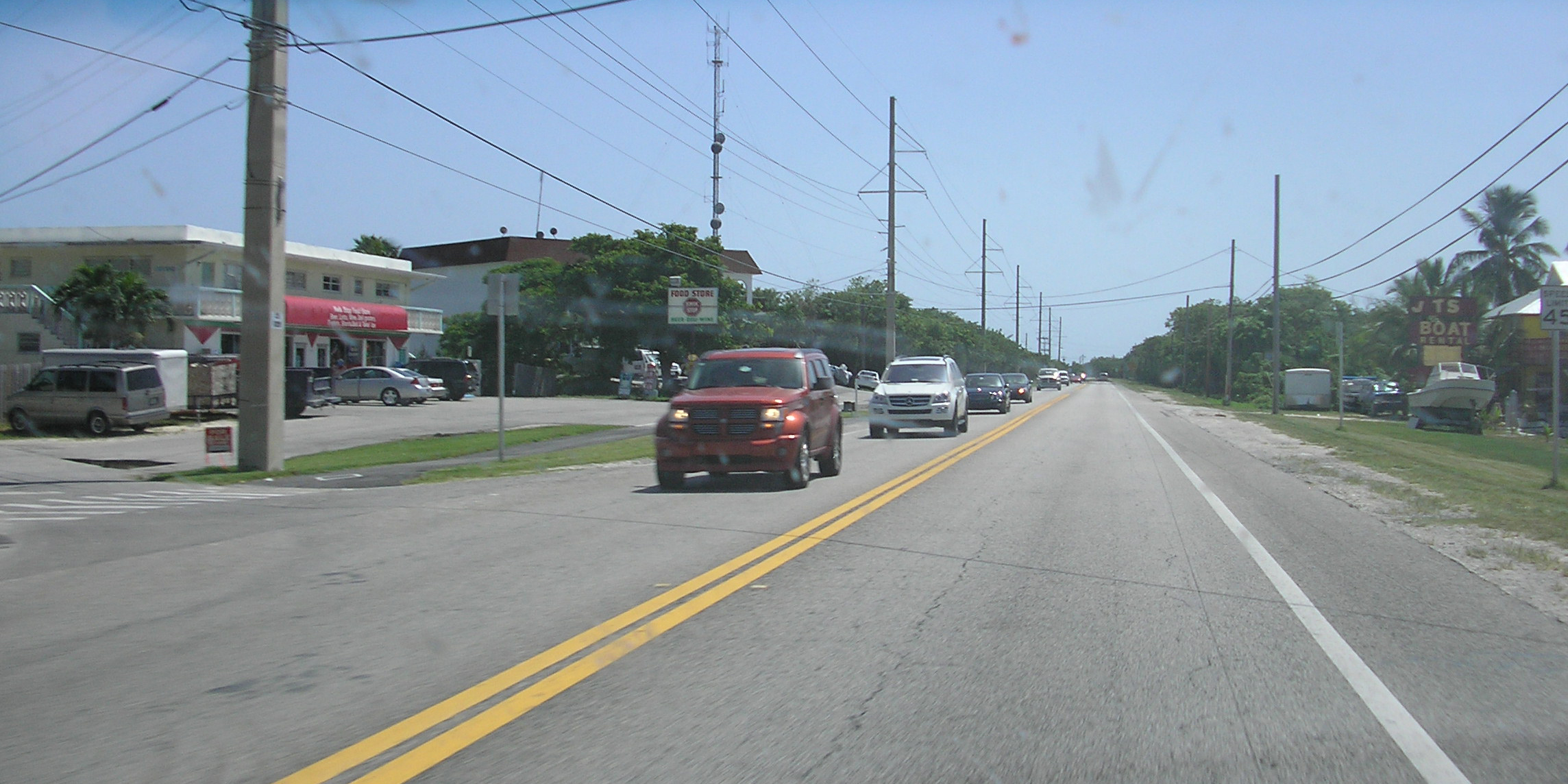
- Downtown Layton as seen from US 1 looking south along the road

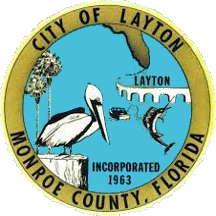
- Seal

- Location in Monroe County and the state of Florida

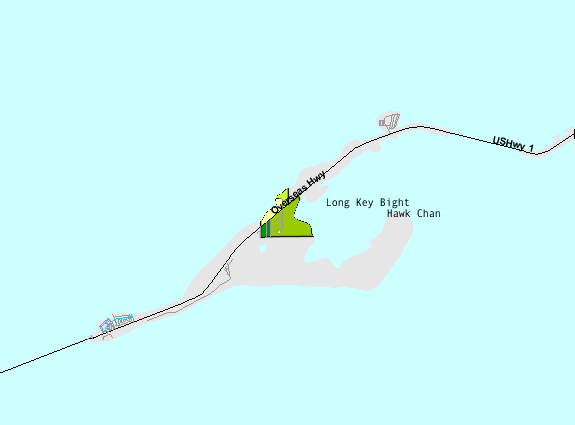
- U.S. Census Bureau map showing city limits
- Coordinates: 24°49′29″N 80°48′46″W
- Country: United States
- State: Florida
- County: Monroe
- Settled (Long Key Settlement): c. Late 1800s–1910
- Incorporated (City of Layton): September 18, 1963

Government
  - Type: Mayor-Council
  - Mayor: Bruce Halle
  - Vice Mayor: Gregory Lewis
  - Councilors: Jared Rodriguez, Megan Jones, Cindy Lewis, and Susan Grant
  - City Administrator and City Clerk: Mimi M. Young
  - City Attorney: Henry O'Conner

Area
  - Total: 0.22 sq mi (0.58 km^{2})
  - Land: 0.16 sq mi (0.42 km^{2})
  - Water: 0.062 sq mi (0.16 km^{2})
- Elevation: 0 ft (0 m)

Population (2020)
  - Total: 210
  - Density: 1,293.6/sq mi (499.47/km^{2})
- Time zone: UTC-5 (Eastern (EST))
  - Summer (DST): UTC-4 (EDT)
- ZIP code: 33001
- Area code(s): 305, 786, 645
- FIPS code: 12-39725
- GNIS feature ID: 2404899
- Website: www.cityoflayton.com

Layton is a city located on the island of Long Key in Monroe County, Florida, United States. The city is part of the Florida Keys. The population was 210 at the 2020 census.

== History ==
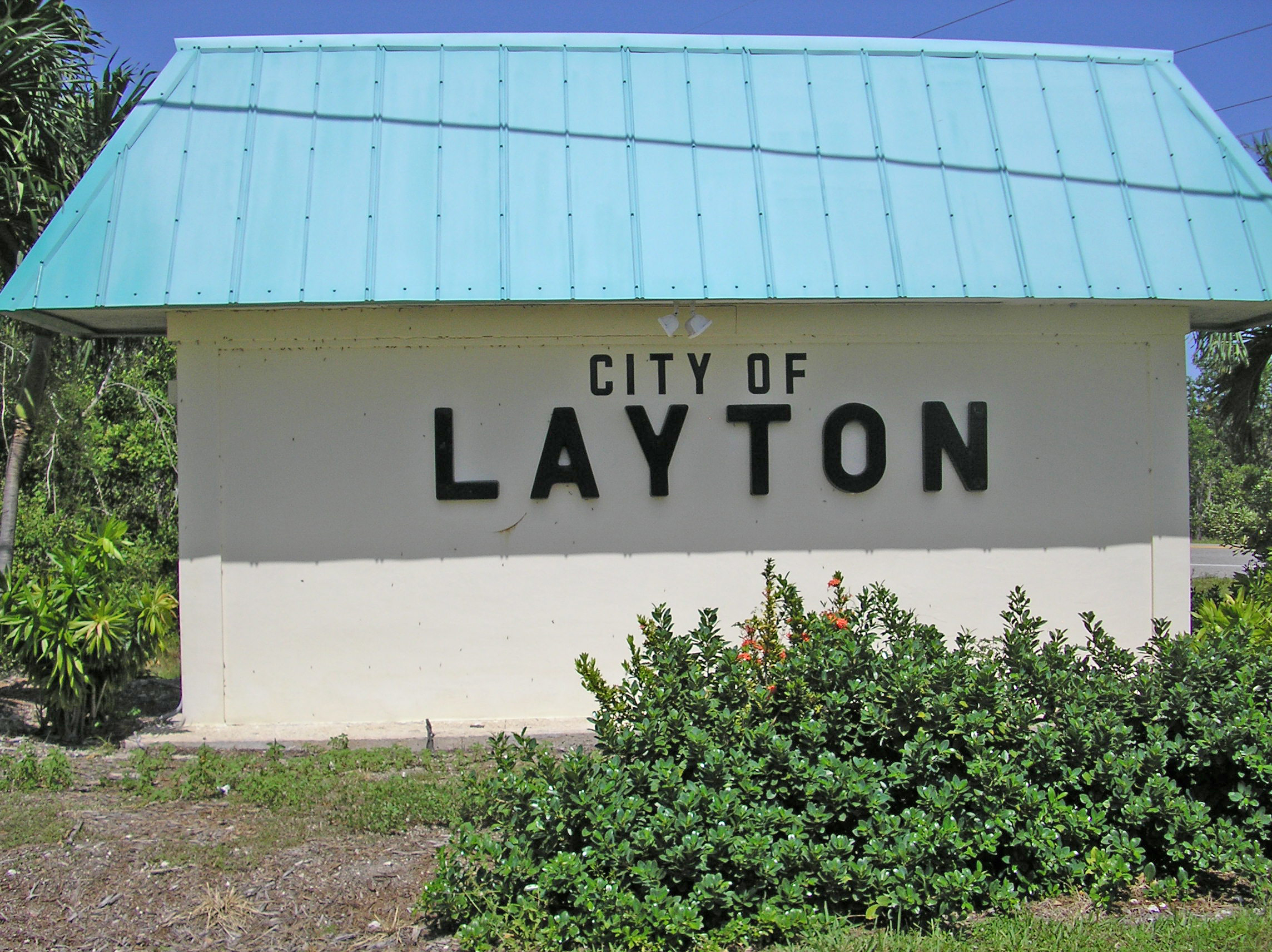
A sign indicating the border of the city of Layton

In the late 19th century, Long Key was used as a coconut plantation. By 1910, Layton was becoming famous as a fishing destination, thanks in part to promotion by sportswriter, Zane Grey. However, the developing tourist infrastructure on Long Key, including a station on the Overseas Railroad, was largely destroyed by the Labor Day Hurricane of 1935.

After World War II, Mary V. Layton (1907-1993) and Delbert “Del” Layton (1906-1987), who ran a grocery business in Miami, bought 40 acres (160,000 m^{2}) on Long Key and started developing the property as "Layton's Long Key Fishing Camp", which grew substantially over the succeeding years.

The City of Layton was officially incorporated on September 18, 1963.

The land that would become Long Key State Park was acquired between 1961 and 1973; the park opened on October 1, 1969.

== Geography ==
The City of Layton is on Long Key and located along U.S. Route 1. Via US 1 it is 66 miles (106 km) northeast of Key West and 88 miles (142 km) southwest of Miami.

According to the United States Census Bureau, the city has a total area of 0.22 square miles (0.57 km^{2}). 0.16 square miles (0.41 km^{2}) of it are land and 0.06 square miles (0.16 km^{2}) of it (27.03%) are water.

=== Climate ===
The City of Layton has a tropical climate, similar to the climate found in much of the Caribbean. It is part of the only region in the 48 contiguous states that falls under that category. More specifically, it generally has a tropical savanna climate (Köppen climate classification: Aw), bordering a tropical monsoon climate (Köppen climate classification: Am).

== Demographics ==
Historical population
Census	Pop.	Note	%±
1970	100		—
1980	88		−12.0%
1990	183		108.0%
2000	186		1.6%
2010	184		−1.1%
2020	210		14.1%
U.S. Decennial Census

=== 2010 and 2020 census ===
Layton racial composition (Hispanics excluded from racial categories) (NH = Non-Hispanic)
Race	Pop 2010	Pop 2020	% 2010	% 2020
White (NH)	158	165	85.87%	78.57%
Black or African American (NH)	4	2	2.17%	0.95%
Native American or Alaska Native (NH)	3	0	1.63%	0.00%
Asian (NH)	4	0	2.17%	0.00%
Pacific Islander or Native Hawaiian (NH)	0	0	0.00%	0.00%
Some other race (NH)	0	0	0.00%	0.00%
Two or more races/Multiracial (NH)	2	2	1.09%	0.95%
Hispanic or Latino (any race)	13	41	7.07%	19.52%
Total	184	210		

As of the 2020 United States census, there were 210 people, 55 households, and 28 families residing in the city.

As of the 2010 United States census, there were 184 people, 76 households, and 47 families residing in the city.

=== 2000 census ===
As of the census of 2000, there were 186 people, 84 households, and 50 families living in the city. The population density was 860.0 inhabitants per square mile (332.0/km^{2}). There were 165 housing units at an average density of 762.9 per square mile (294.6/km^{2}). The racial makeup of the city was 98.92% White, 0.54% African American and 0.54% Asian. Hispanic or Latino of any race were 2.15% of the population.

In 2000, there were 84 households, out of which 15.5% had children under the age of 18 living with them, 56.0% were married couples living together, 1.2% had a female householder with no husband present, and 39.3% were non-families. 22.6% of all households were made up of individuals, and 4.8% had someone living alone who was 65 years of age or older. The average household size was 2.21 and the average family size was 2.61.

In 2000, in the city, the population was spread out, with 11.3% under the age of 18, 7.5% from 18 to 24, 23.1% from 25 to 44, 39.8% from 45 to 64, and 18.3% who were 65 years of age or older. The median age was 51 years. For every 100 females, there were 95.8 males. For every 100 females age 18 and over, there were 98.8 males.

In 2000, the median income for a household in the city was $53,750, and the median income for a family was $73,750. Males had a median income of $29,896 versus $23,125 for females. The per capita income for the city was $23,773. About 11.7% of families and 15.4% of the population were below the poverty line, including none of those under the age of eighteen and 21.4% of those 65 or over.

=== Languages ===
As of 2000, English as a first language accounted for 90.68%, while Spanish as a mother tongue made up 9.31% of the population.

== Education ==
All public schools are served by the Monroe County School District. Students are zoned to Plantation Key School (K-8).
