= Long Key State Park =

State park in Florida, United States

- IUCN category V (protected landscape/seascape)
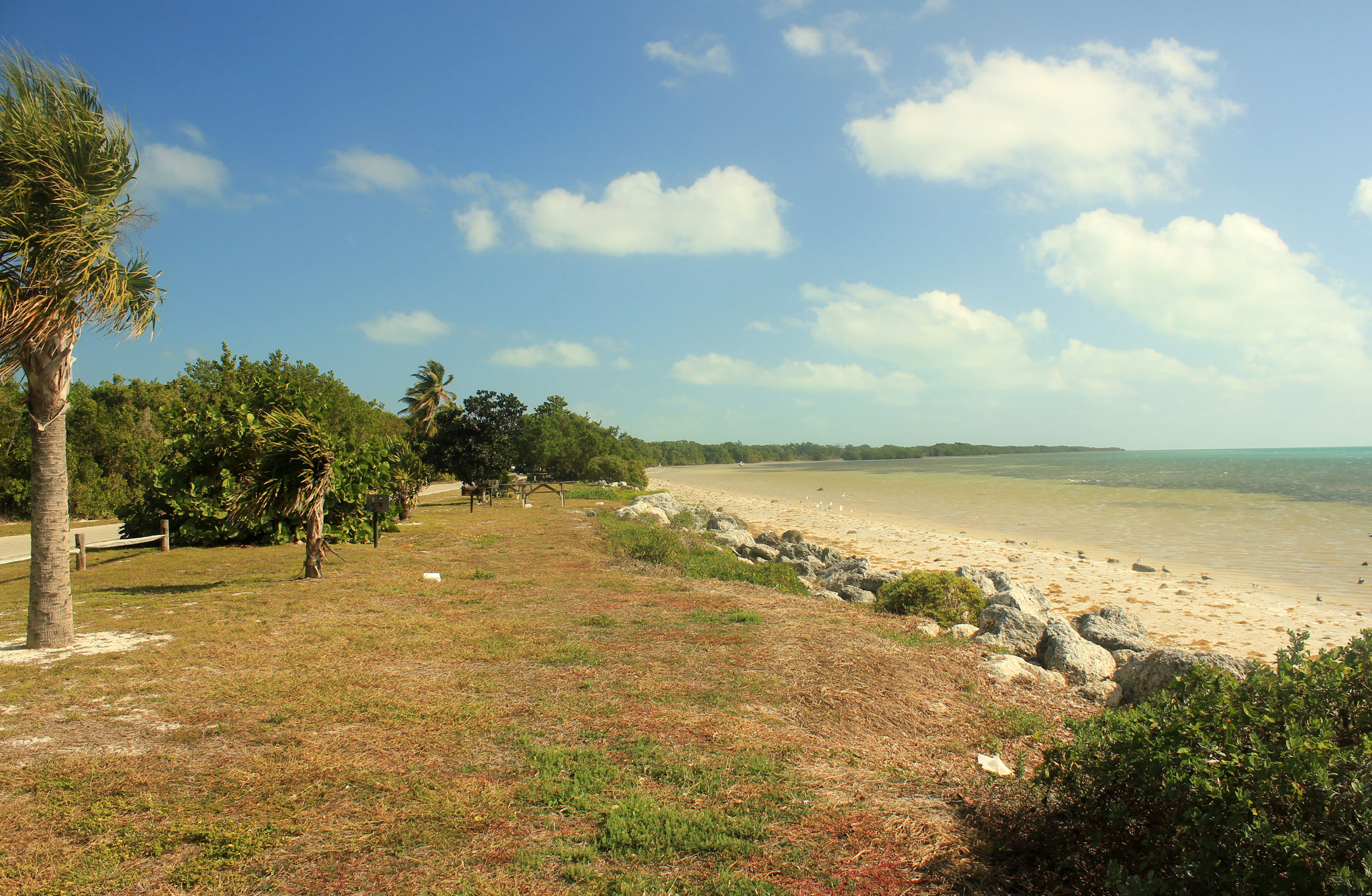

- Location within Florida Location within the United States
- Interactive map of Long Key State Park
- Location: Monroe County, Florida, United States
- Nearest city: Long Key, Florida
- Coordinates: 24°49′01″N 80°49′12″W
- Area: 965 acres (3.91 km^{2})
- Governing body: Florida Department of Environmental Protection

Long Key State Park is a 965-acre (3.91 km^{2}) Florida State Park located on Long Key, one of the Florida Keys, in Monroe County, Florida, United States. It is at mile marker 67.5 on U.S. 1, 67400 Overseas Highway.

== History ==
Prehistoric coral reefs grew here over the course of millennia, when the sea level was over 20 feet (6.1 m) deeper. The remnants came to form Long Key, and the rest of the Florida Keys.

The climate and waters provided abundant plant and aquatic life for the Calusa, who settled in the area long before Spanish explorers arrived.

"Cayo Vivora", or Rattlesnake Key, is what the first Spaniards called the island, since to them it resembled a snake with its jaws open.

By the early twentieth century, Long Key became an important depot for the completed Key West Extension of the Florida East Coast Railroad. The railroad's founder, Henry Flagler, also established the Long Key Fishing Camp, a resort that attracted the greatest saltwater fishermen from around the world. But it did not last for long, when in 1935, the Labor Day hurricane devastated the Club, the railroad, and much of the Keys.

The land that came to comprise the park was acquired between 1961 and 1973, with the official opening in 1969.

== Biology ==
The plant life at Long Key originated in the Caribbean. Trees include mangrove, West Indian mahogany (Swietenia mahagoni), Jamaica fish poisontree (Piscidia piscipula), poisonwood (Metopium toxiferum), gumbo-limbo (Bursera simaruba) and oysterwood (Gymnanthes lucida).

The shallow waters are a haven for saltwater fish and other marine life. Numerous wading birds can be seen, especially during the winter.

White-crowned pigeons inhabit the park's hardwood hammocks and feed on poisonwood fruit. These elevated, relatively dry habitats also provide refuge for songbirds.

=== Gallery ===
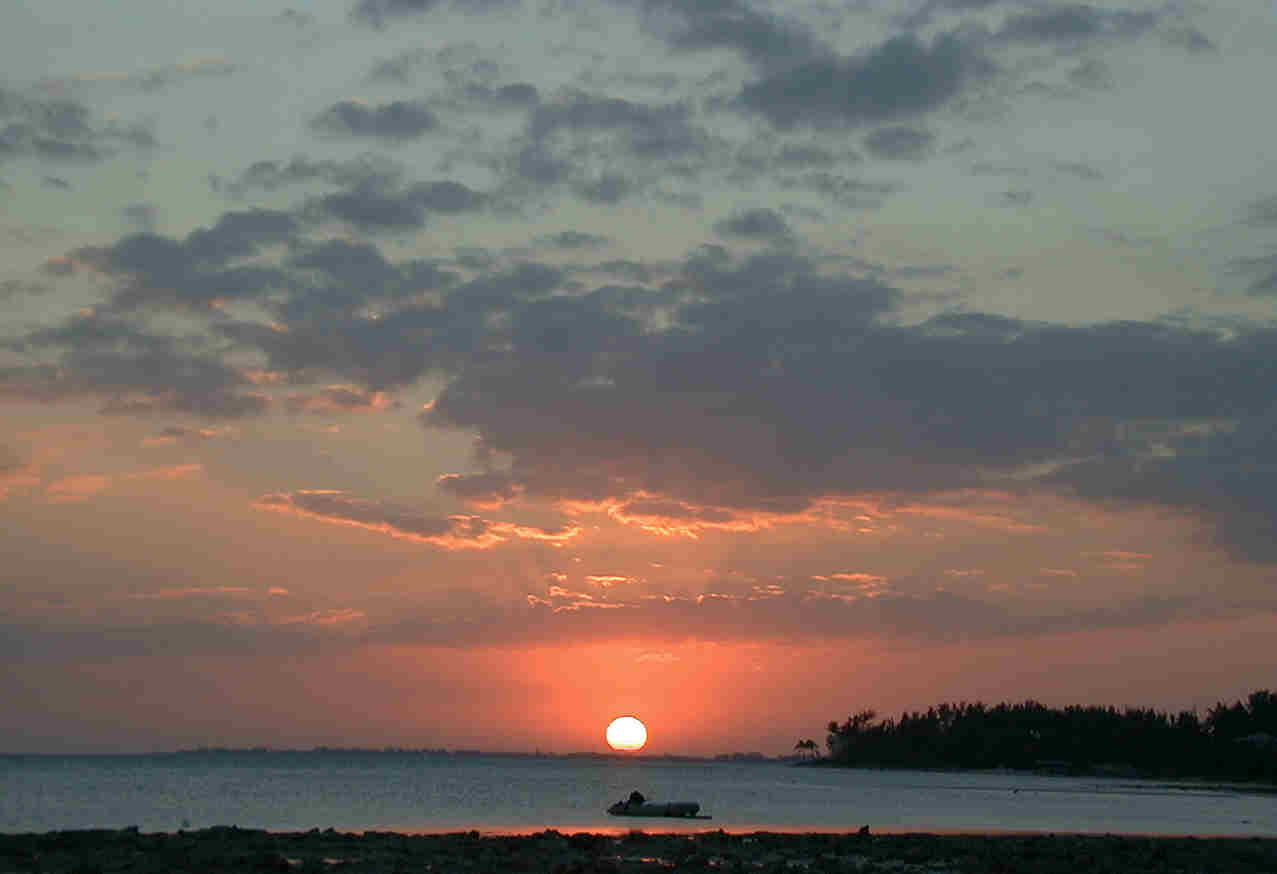
Sunset from the campground.

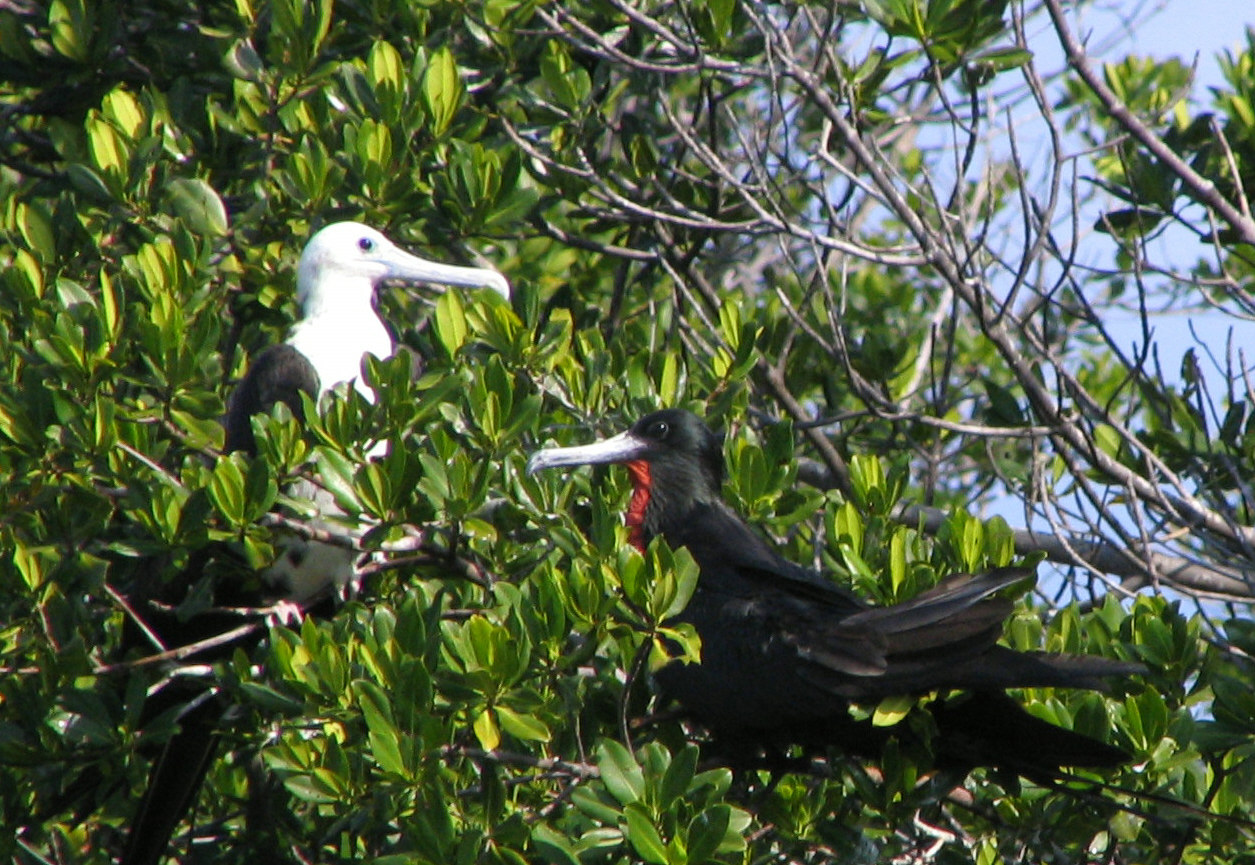
Magnificent frigatebirds

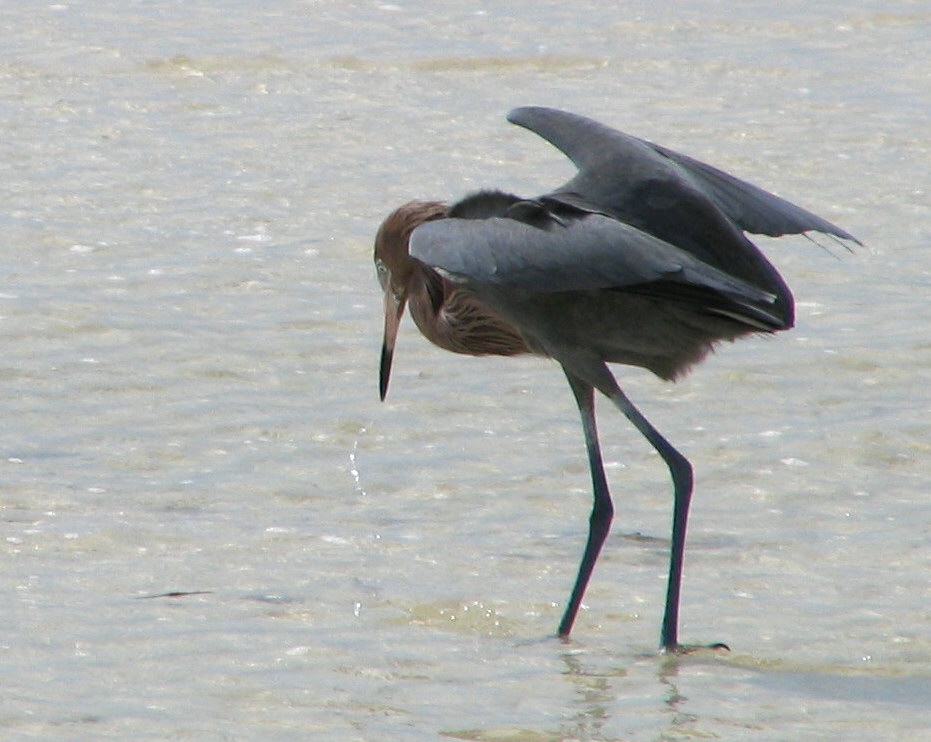
Reddish egret

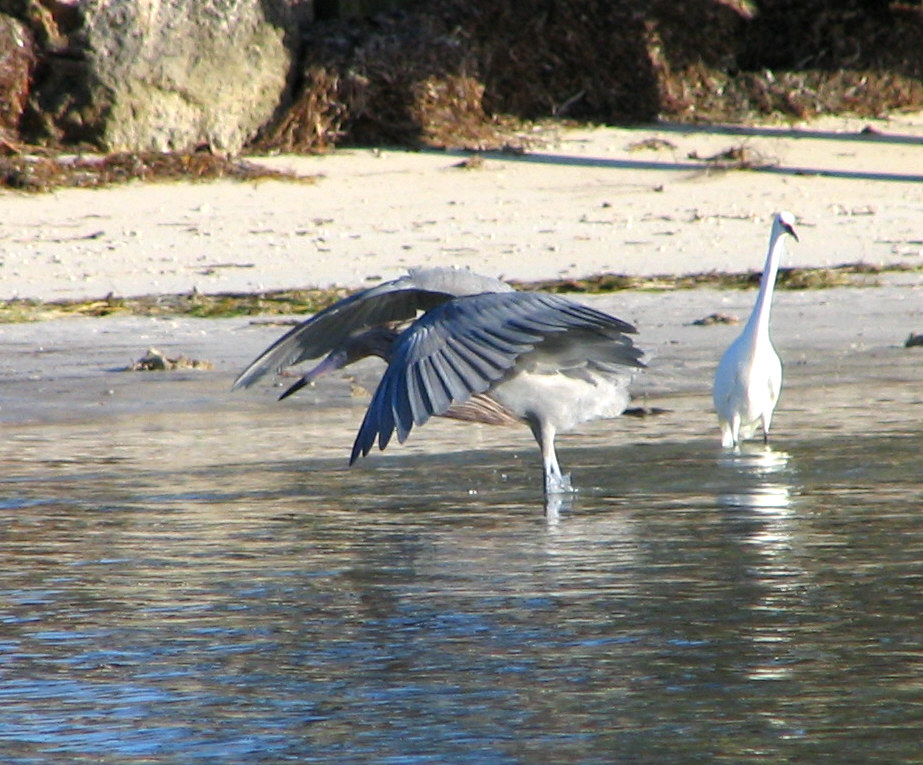
Reddish egret with a great egret looking on.

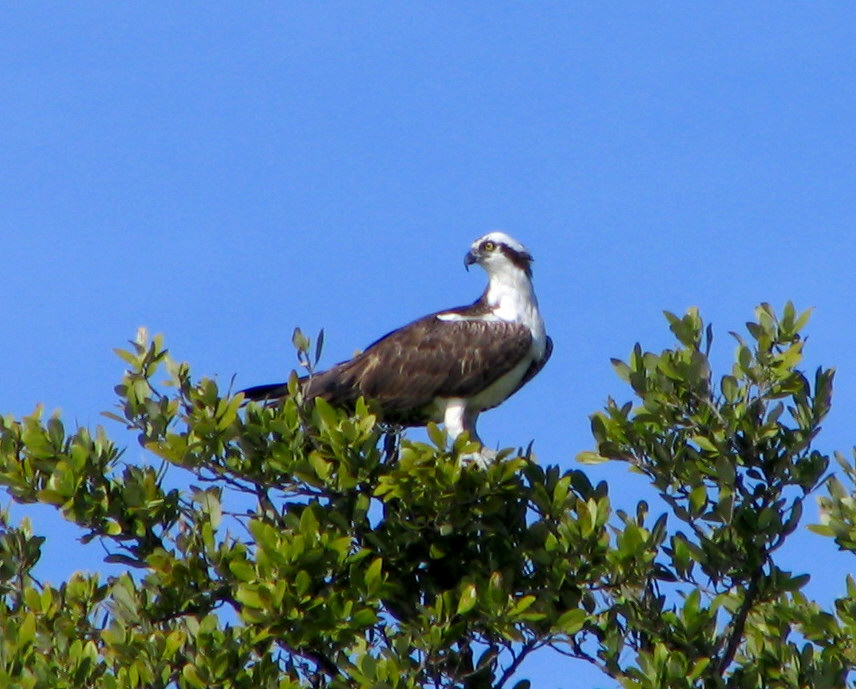
Osprey

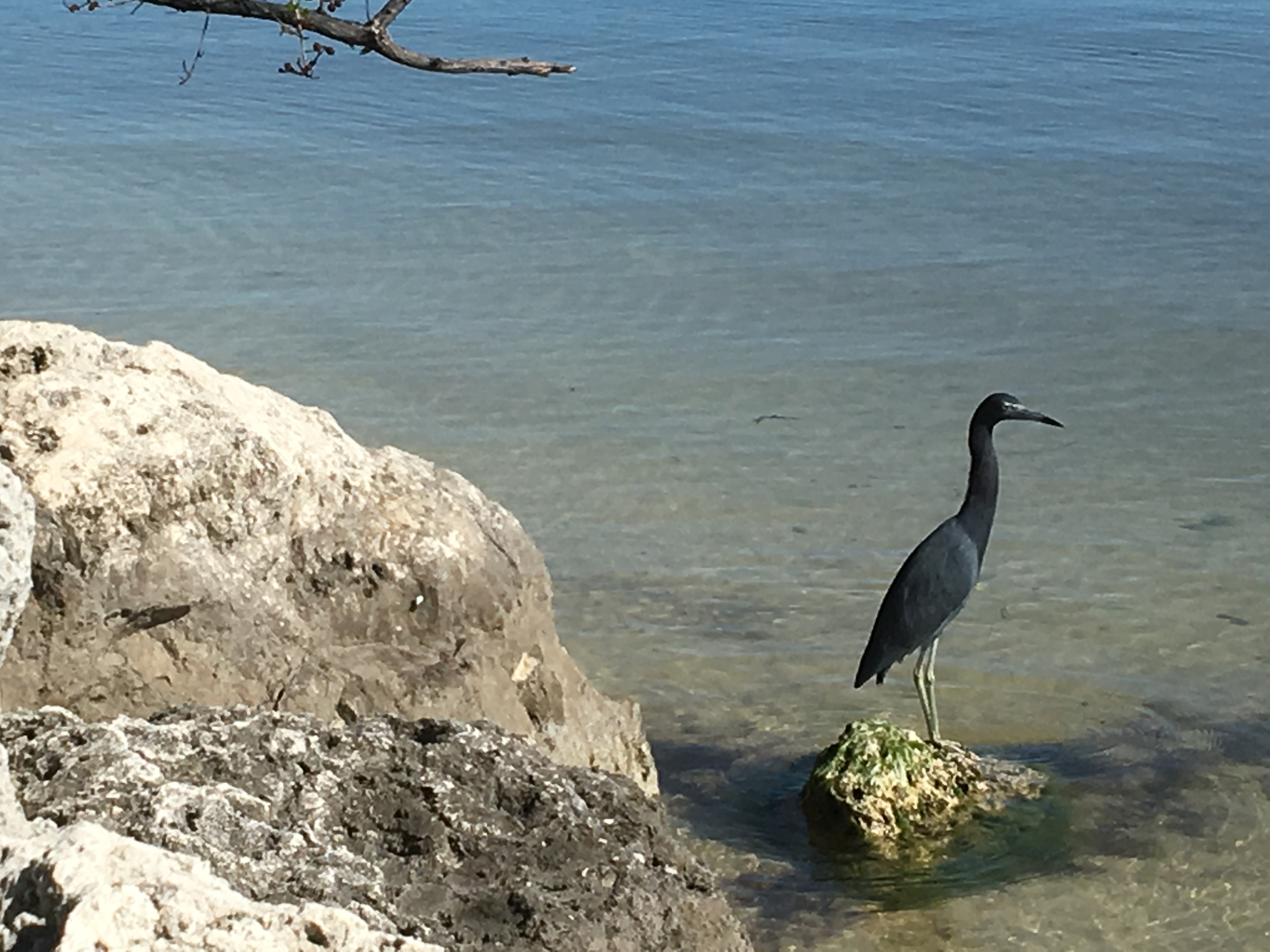
Little blue heron

== Recreational activities ==
Activities include swimming, snorkeling, kayaking, picnicking, hiking, and birding as well as full facility camping. Amenities include two nature trails (The Golden Orb Trail, and Layton Trail), picnic areas, restrooms, and 60 full-facility campsites.
