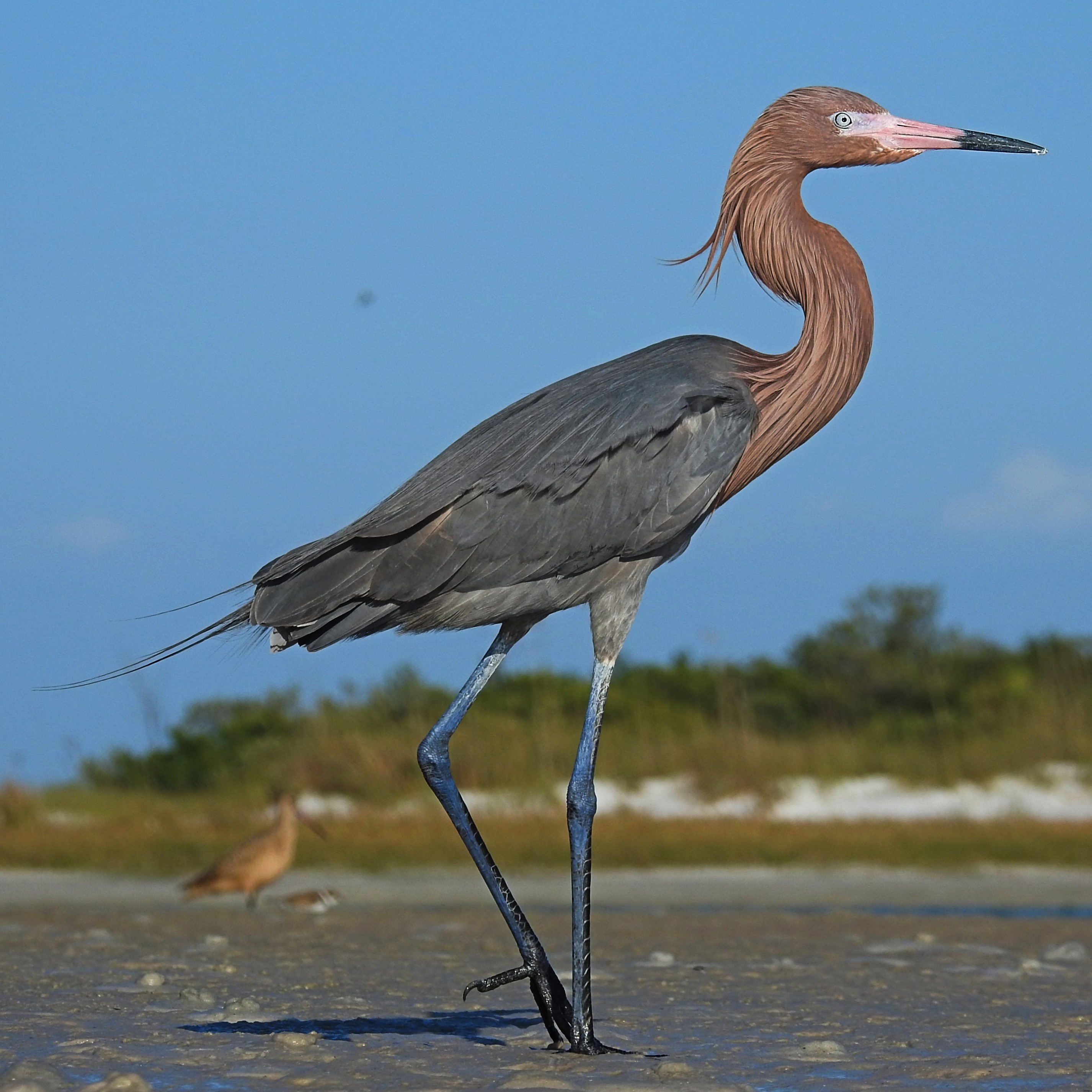
- Reddish egret in breeding plumage at Fort Desoto, Florida, US

Conservation status
- Near Threatened (IUCN 3.1)

Scientific classification
- Kingdom: Animalia
- Phylum: Chordata
- Class: Aves
- Order: Pelecaniformes
- Family: Ardeidae
- Genus: Egretta
- Species: E. rufescens

Binomial name
- Egretta rufescens (Gmelin, 1789)
- Breeding Year-round Nonbreeding

Synonyms
- Ardea rufescens Gmelin, 1789; Dichromanassa rufescens (Gmelin, 1789); Hydranassa rufescens subsp. rufescens Stotz et al., 1996

= Reddish egret =

Species of bird

The reddish egret (Egretta rufescens) is a medium-sized heron that is a resident breeder in Central America, the Bahamas, the Caribbean, the Gulf Coast of the United States (primarily Texas), and Mexico. The egret is known for its unusual foraging behavior compared to other herons as well as its association with mud flats, its habitat of choice.

In the past, this bird was a victim of the plume trade and is North America's "rarest and least studied ardeid."

== Taxonomy ==
The reddish egret was formally described in 1789 by the German naturalist Johann Friedrich Gmelin in his revised and expanded edition of Carl Linnaeus's Systema Naturae. He placed it with the herons, cranes and egrets in the genus Ardea and coined the binomial name Ardea rufescens. Gmelin based his description on that of the English ornithologist John Latham who in 1785 had included the species in his multi-volume A General Synopsis of Birds. Latham had in turn based his own description on the "L'Aigrette rousse, de la Louisiane" that the French polymath Comte de Buffon had described and illustrated in his Histoire Naturelle des Oiseaux. The reddish egret is now placed with 12 other species in the genus Egretta that was introduced in 1817 by the German naturalist Johann Reinhold Forster. The genus name comes from the Provençal French word for the little egret, aigrette, a diminutive of aigron, "heron". The specific epithet rufescens is Latin meaning "reddish".

Two subspecies are recognized:

- E. r. rufescens (Gmelin 1789) – south US, West Indies and Mexico
- E. r. dickeyi (Van Rossem, 1926) – Baja California (Mexico)

== Description ==
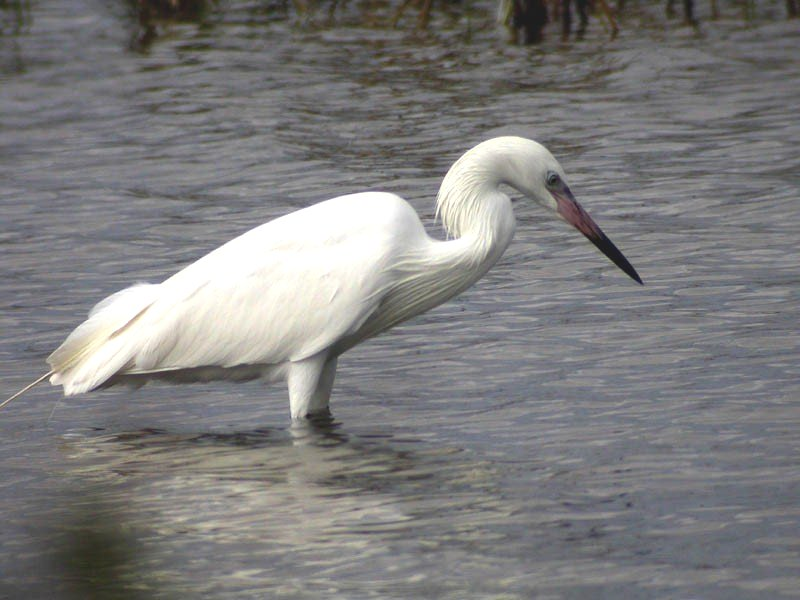
Adult white morph

This species reaches 68–82 cm (27–32 in) in length, with a 116–125 cm (46–49 in) wingspan. Body mass in this species can range from 364–870 g (0.802–1.918 lb). Among standard linear measurements, the wing chord is 29–34.3 cm (11.4–13.5 in), the tail is 8.8–13 cm (3.5–5.1 in), the bill is 7.3–9.2 cm (2.9–3.6 in) and the tarsus is 11.7–14.7 cm (4.6–5.8 in). It is a medium-sized, long-legged, long-necked heron with a long pointed pinkish bill with a black tip. It is distinctly larger than other co-existing members of the genus Egretta, but smaller than the great blue heron and great egret. The legs and feet are bluish-black. While the sexes are similar, there are two distinct color morphs. The adult dark morph has a slate blue body and reddish head and neck with shaggy plumes. The adult white morph has entirely white body plumage. Young birds have a brown body, head, and neck. During mating, the male's plumage stands out in a ruff on its head, neck and back. The bird's usual cry is a low, guttural croak.

== Behavior ==
The reddish egret is considered one of the most active herons, and is often seen on the move. It stalks its prey (fish, frogs, crustaceans, and insects) in shallow water, typically near mud flats, while frequently running energetically and using the shadow of its wings to reduce glare on the water once it is in position to spear its prey. Due to its bold, rapacious yet graceful feeding behavior and its typical proximity to mud flats, author Pete Dunne nicknamed the reddish egret "the Tyrannosaurus rex of the Flats".

=== Breeding ===
The reddish egret is a resident breeder in Central America, The Bahamas, the Caribbean, the Gulf Coast of the United States, and Mexico. Its breeding habitat is tropical swamps. It nests in colonies, often with other herons, usually on platforms of sticks in trees or shrubs. These colonies are usually located on coastal islands. In Texas, however, these nests are often built on the ground, sometimes on oyster shell beaches. These birds have raucous courtship displays. They generally involve shaking of the head during the greeting ceremony, followed by chases and circle flights. They also involve raising of the neck, back and crest feathers, accompanied by bill clacking, similar to the tricolored heron (Egretta tricolor).

According to the Texas Parks and Wildlife Department, there are only 1,500 to 2,000 nesting pairs of reddish egrets in the United States—and most of these are in Texas. They are classified as "threatened" in Texas and receive special protection.

== Gallery ==
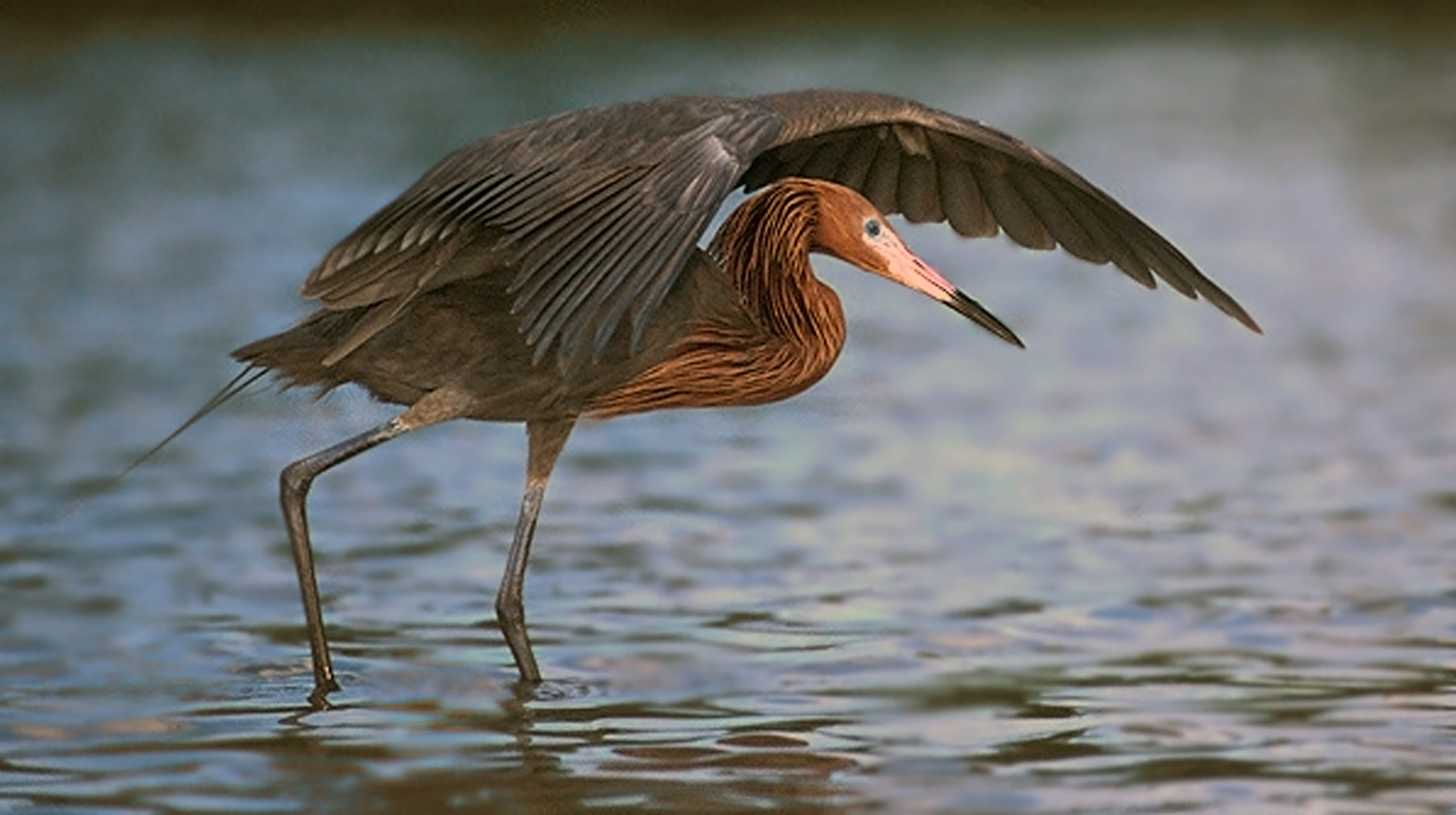
Canopy hunting

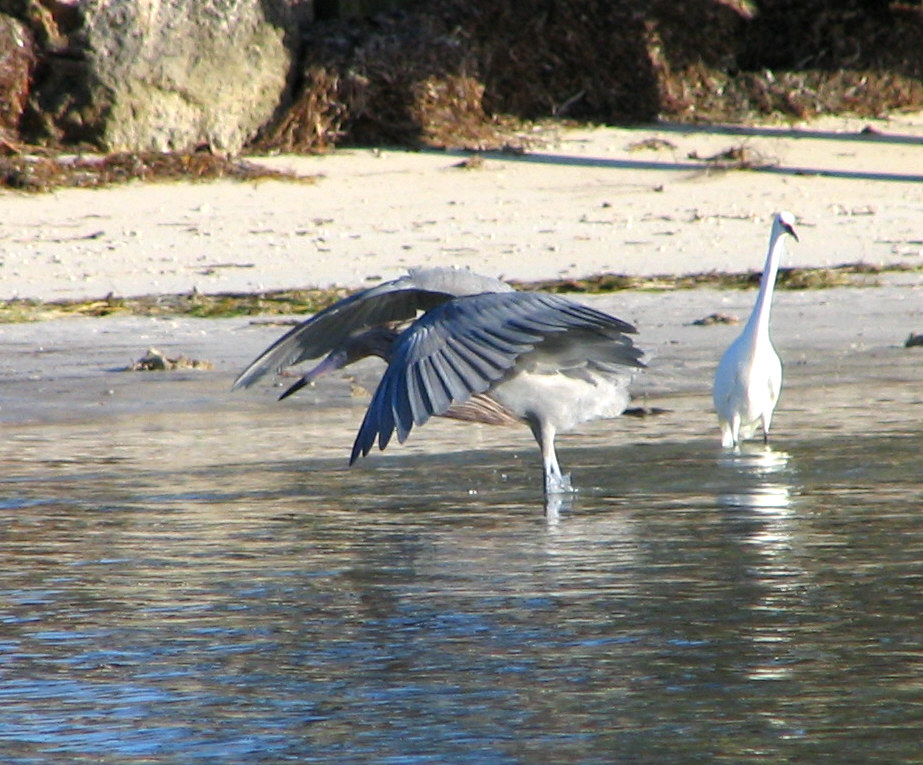
With great egret at Long Key State Park

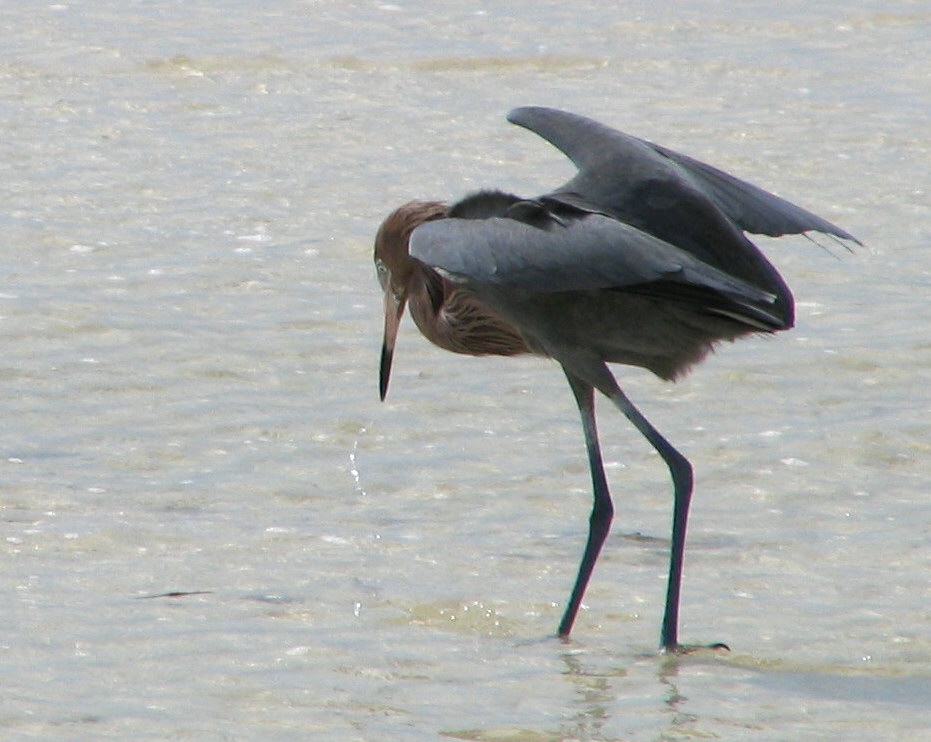
At Long Key State Park

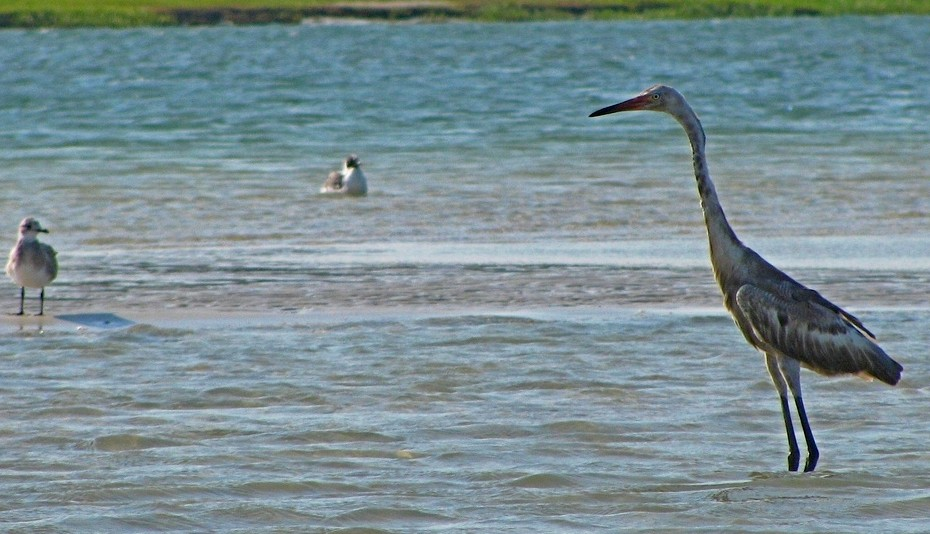
Intermediate morph in Jacksonville, Florida

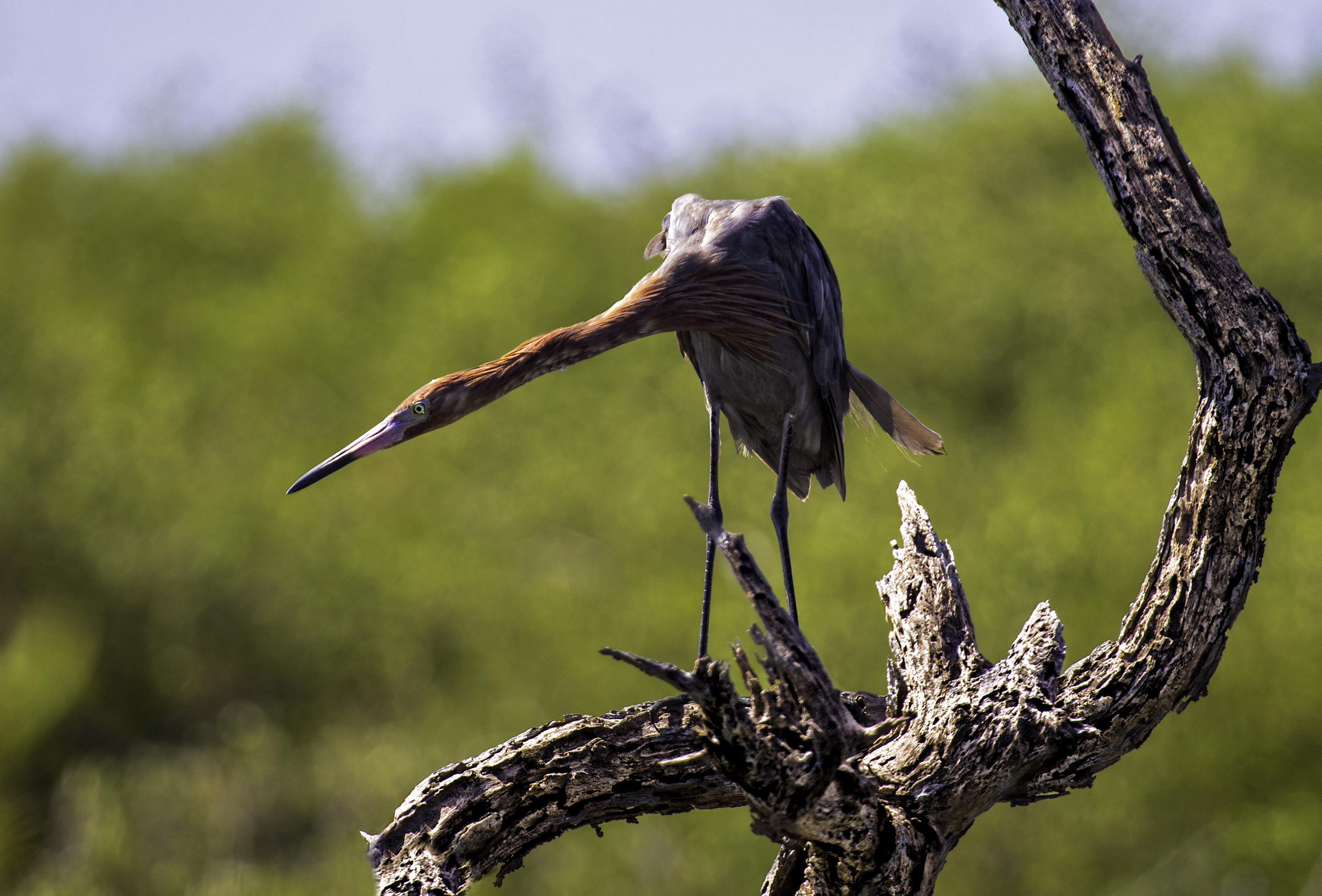
Fishing the mangroves, Lac Cai, Bonaire

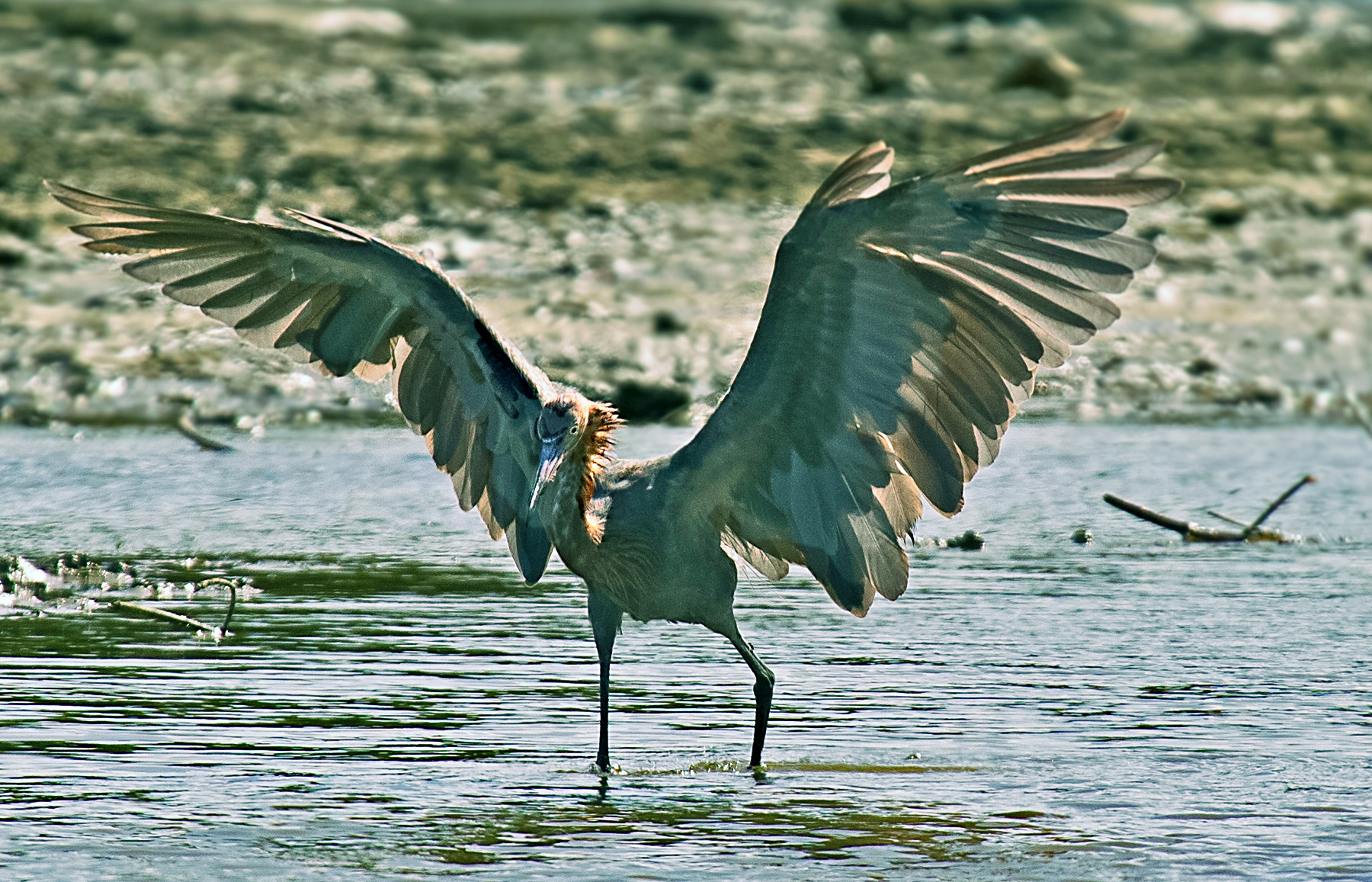
Canopy fishing, Lac Cai, Bonaire

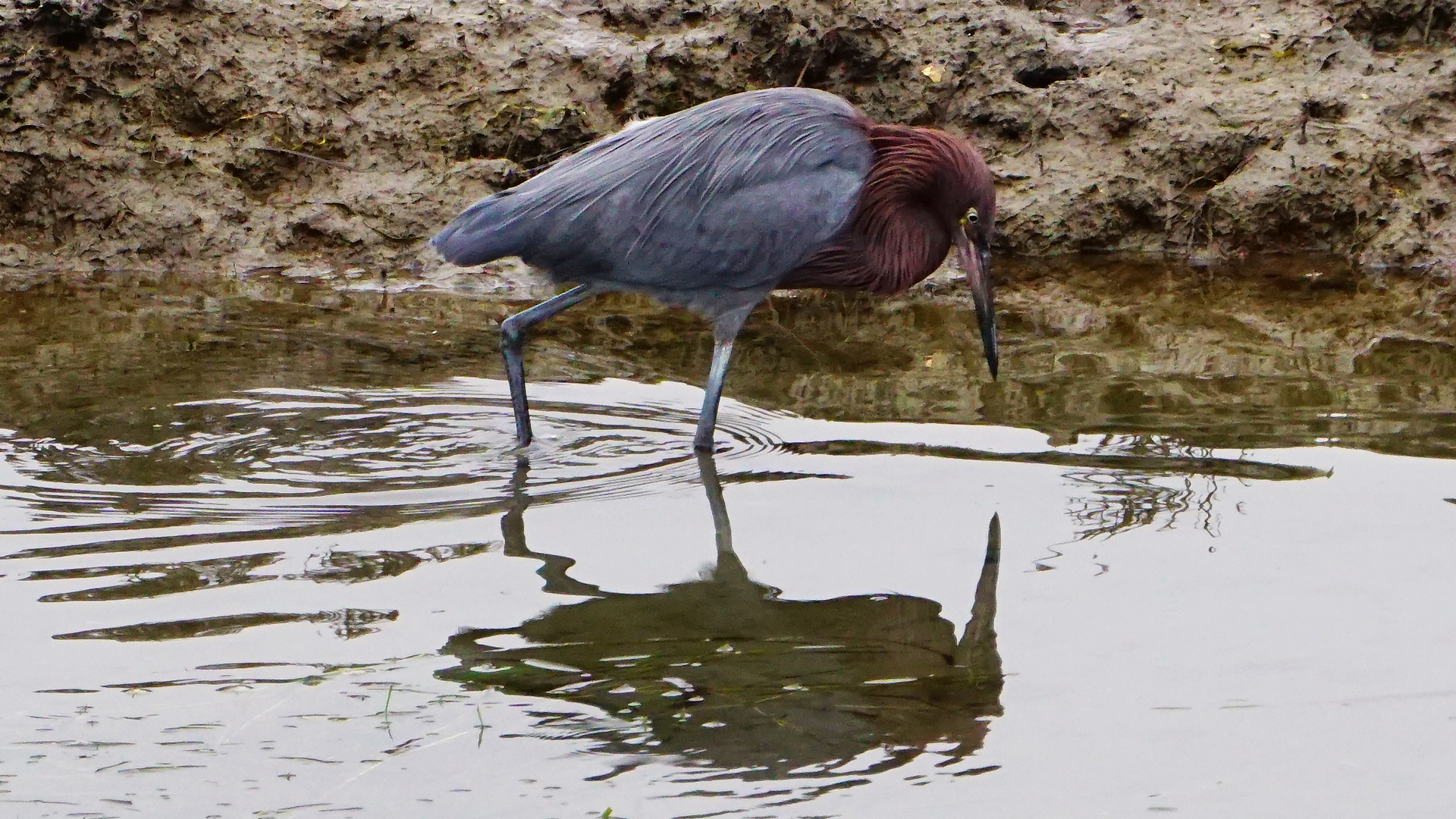
Reddish Egret (Bolsa Chica Wetlands, Huntington Beach, California)

== Predation ==
In Florida, reddish egrets may be eaten by some growth stage of invasive snakes like Burmese pythons, reticulated pythons, Southern African rock pythons, Central African rock pythons, boa constrictors, yellow anacondas, Bolivian anacondas, dark-spotted anacondas, and green anacondas.
