= Long Key Fishing Camp =

Coordinates: 24.826°N 80.814°W

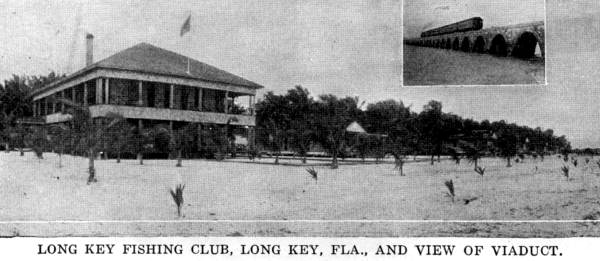
Long Key Fishing Camp, ca. 1919

Long Key Fishing Camp was established on Long Key in Florida in 1908 by Henry M. Flagler's Florida East Coast Railway Company for the use of tourists to enjoy what was described as "some of the best fishing in the world". It initially served as housing for some of the employees who were building the Overseas Railroad to Key West.

Long Key Fishing Camp featured a two-story hotel and a number of cottages. The camp was made famous by author Zane Grey, who was a regular resident, and a pioneer of the sport of sail fishing. Grey became the first president of the Long Key Fishing Club in 1917. The list of early distinguished guests included Herbert Hoover, Franklin Roosevelt, Andrew Mellon, Charles Kettering, and other notables.

The fishing camp was destroyed by the Labor Day Hurricane of 1935, as was the Overseas Railroad. After the latter was destroyed, the Overseas Highway (U.S. 1), was built across Long Key in replacement.
