= Long Key =

Island in the Florida Keys, Florida, United States

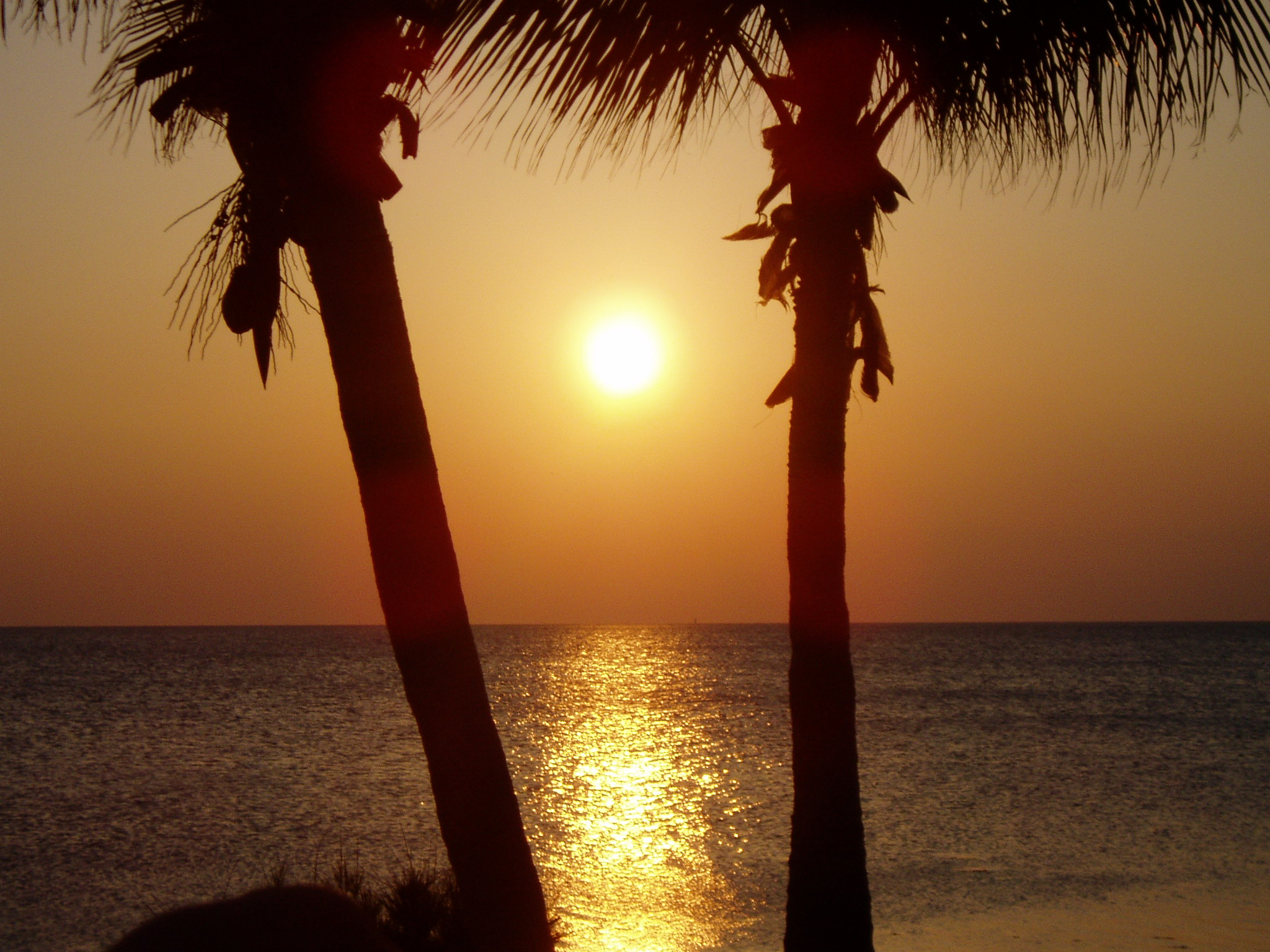
- View of sunset from the city of Layton.

- Long Key Long Key (the Caribbean)

Geography
- Location: Gulf of Mexico
- Coordinates: 24.819°N 80.814°W

Administration
- United States
- State: Florida
- County: Monroe

Long Key is an island in the middle Florida Keys. Long Key was called Cayo Víbora (Rattlesnake Key) by early Spanish explorers, a reference to the shape of the island, which resembles a snake with its jaws open, rather than to its denizens. The city of Layton is located on Long Key. The 965-acre (3.9 km^{2}) state park (3.9 km^{2}) was dedicated October 1, 1969.

U.S. 1 (or the Overseas Highway) crosses the key at approximately mile markers 65.5--71, between Fiesta Key and Conch Key. It is the home of Long Key State Park, a favorite of campers and nature lovers, the camp sites are on the beach but the proximity of US1 makes it noisy. It is smaller and less developed than the neighboring incorporated village of Islamorada to the northeast and city of Marathon to the southwest.

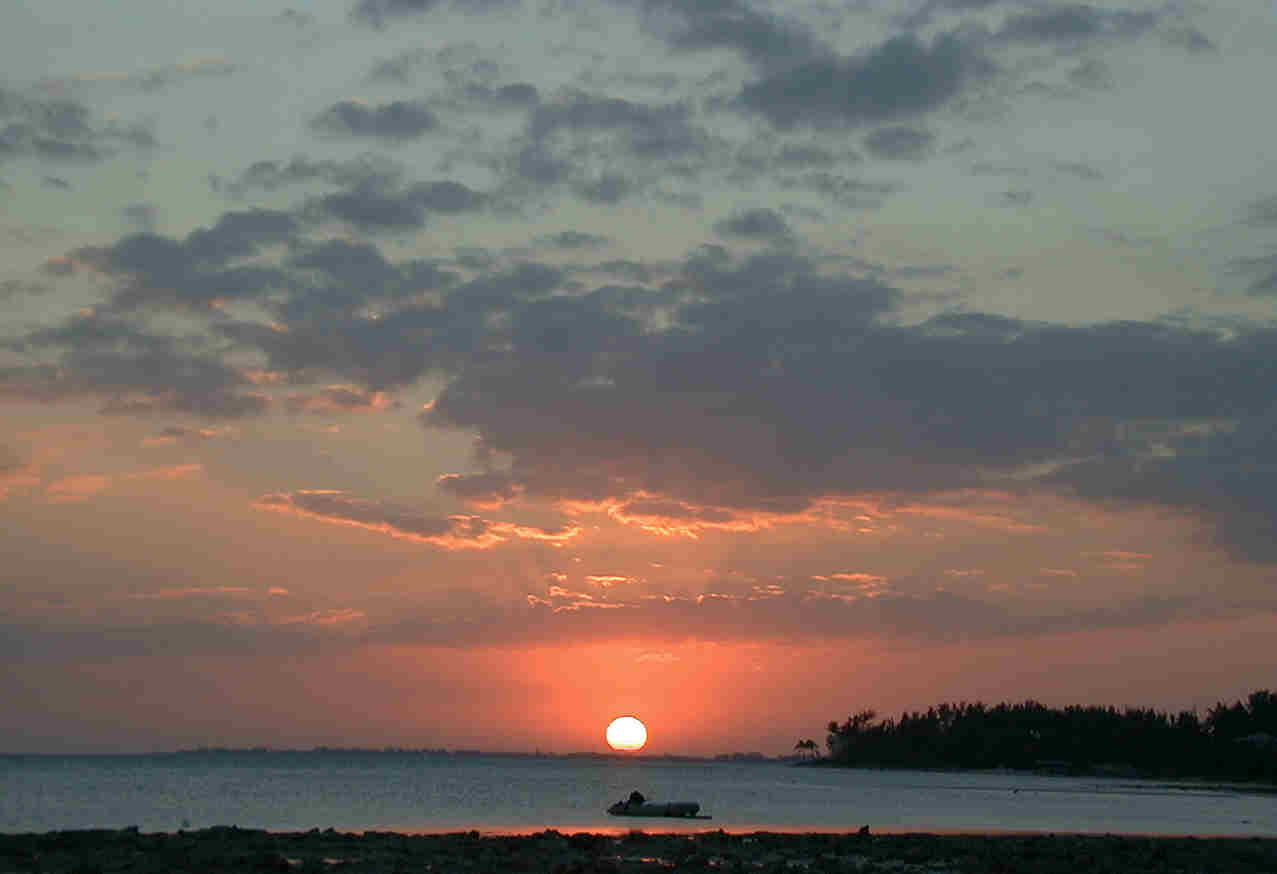
Sunset from Long Key State Park campground

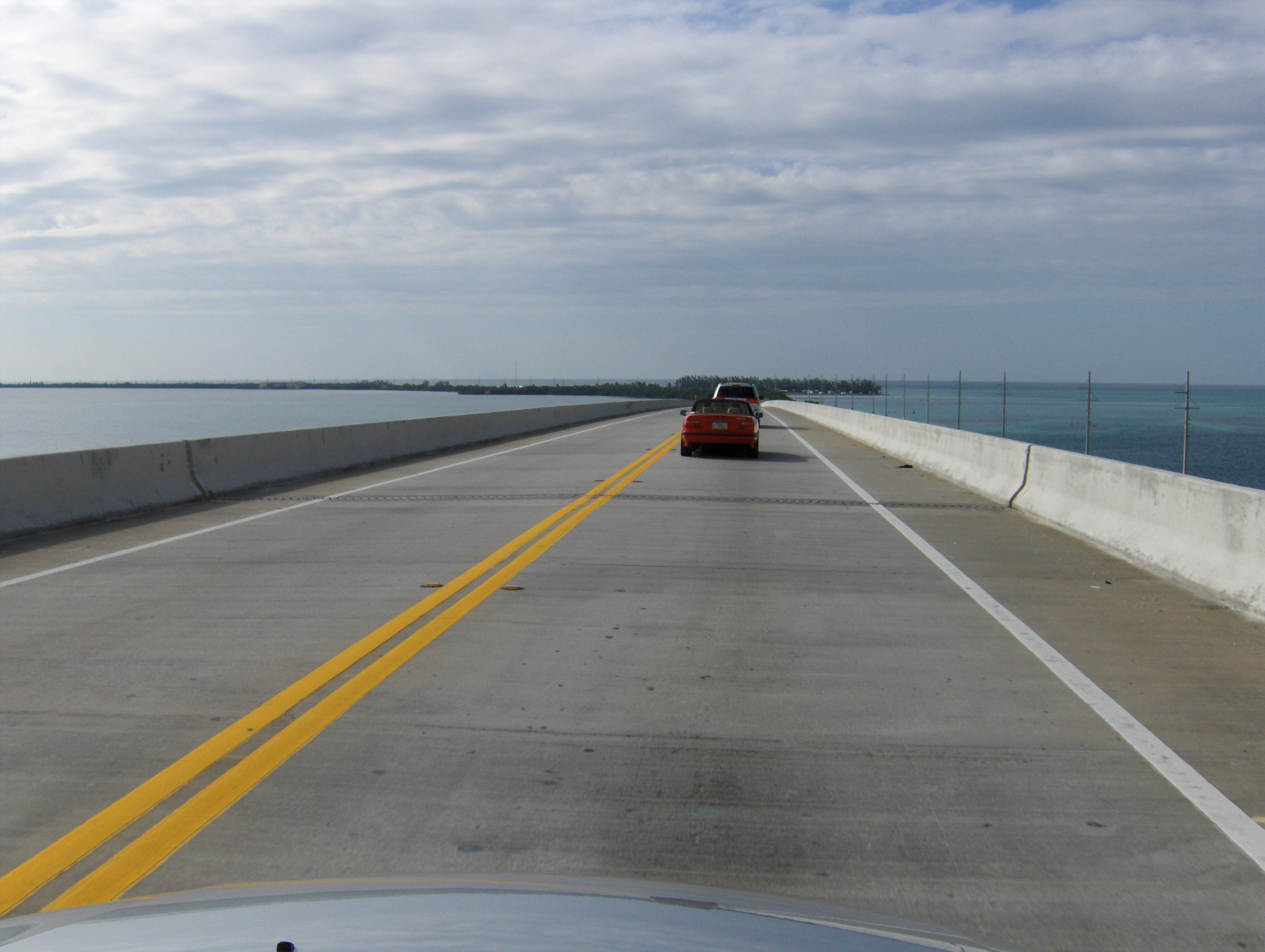
Bridge over channel #5, connecting Long Key with Craig Key. The eastern end of Long and Fiesta Keys are in the background.

== History ==
It was visited by C.W. Pierce in his boat, Bonton (1885). He stopped at the lower end of the key where there was a house with a cistern and replenished his water supply.

The key was a depot site during the railroad years, and it was also the site of the well known Long Key Fishing Camp.

== Education ==
It is in the Monroe County School District. It is zoned to Plantation Key Elementary School (K-8) in Plantation Key.
