= Tavernier, Florida =

- Census-designated place
- Location in Monroe County and the state of Florida

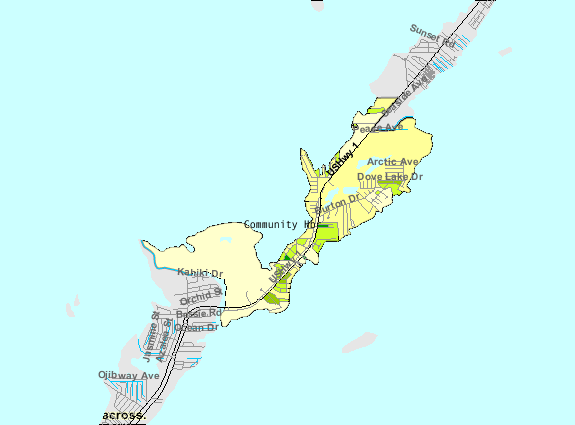
- U.S. Census Bureau map showing CDP boundaries
- Coordinates: 25°0′55″N 80°30′49″W
- Country: United States
- State: Florida
- County: Monroe

Area
  - Total: 2.64 sq mi (6.83 km^{2})
  - Land: 2.51 sq mi (6.51 km^{2})
  - Water: 0.12 sq mi (0.32 km^{2})
- Elevation: 0 ft (0 m)

Population (2020)
  - Total: 2,530
  - Density: 1,006.5/sq mi (388.63/km^{2})
- Time zone: UTC-5 (Eastern (EST))
  - Summer (DST): UTC-4 (EDT)
- ZIP code: 33070
- Area code: 305
- FIPS code: 12-71250
- GNIS feature ID: 2402916

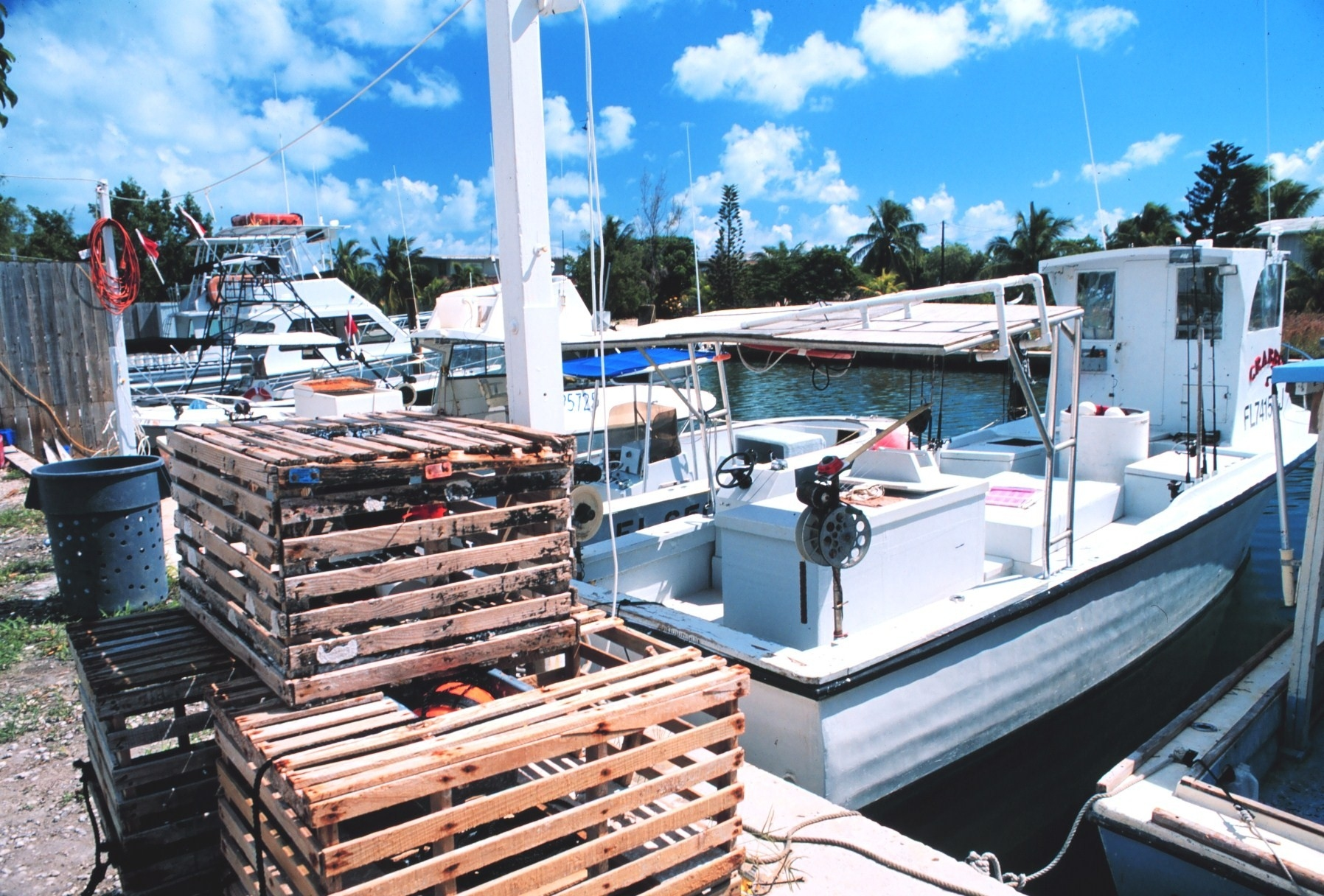
Crab boats in Tavernier

Tavernier is a census-designated place (CDP) and unincorporated community in Monroe County, Florida, United States on Key Largo, the largest island in the upper Florida Keys. Tavernier's population was 2,530 at the 2020 census, up from 2,136 in 2010.

== Geography ==
Tavernier occupies the southwesternmost 3 miles (5 km) of Key Largo, the largest of the Florida Keys. Tavernier is bordered to the northeast by the community of Key Largo and to the southwest, across Tavernier Creek, by the village of Islamorada on Plantation Key.

U.S. Route 1 (the Overseas Highway) runs through Tavernier, leading southwest 90 miles (140 km) to Key West and northeast 64 miles (103 km) to Miami.

According to the United States Census Bureau, the Tavernier CDP has a total area of 2.6 square miles (6.7 km^{2}), of which 0.1 sq mi (0.3 km^{2}), or 4.66%, is covered by water.

=== Climate ===
Tavernier has a tropical savanna climate (Aw), according to the Köppen climate classification.

Climate data for Tavernier, Florida (1991-2020 normals, extremes 1936–2009)
Month	Jan	Feb	Mar	Apr	May	Jun	Jul	Aug	Sep	Oct	Nov	Dec	Year
Record high °F (°C)	87 (31)	87 (31)	90 (32)	94 (34)	94 (34)	97 (36)	97 (36)	98 (37)	98 (37)	94 (34)	90 (32)	89 (32)	98 (37)
Mean maximum °F (°C)	82.1 (27.8)	82.8 (28.2)	84.4 (29.1)	86.7 (30.4)	88.6 (31.4)	91.1 (32.8)	92.5 (33.6)	93.0 (33.9)	91.3 (32.9)	88.8 (31.6)	85.4 (29.7)	82.9 (28.3)	93.6 (34.2)
Mean daily maximum °F (°C)	75.2 (24.0)	77.2 (25.1)	78.9 (26.1)	82.6 (28.1)	85.5 (29.7)	88.0 (31.1)	89.3 (31.8)	89.7 (32.1)	87.8 (31.0)	84.7 (29.3)	80.5 (26.9)	77.2 (25.1)	83.1 (28.4)
Daily mean °F (°C)	69.5 (20.8)	71.3 (21.8)	73.1 (22.8)	77.1 (25.1)	80.3 (26.8)	82.9 (28.3)	84.4 (29.1)	84.4 (29.1)	82.9 (28.3)	80.1 (26.7)	75.3 (24.1)	71.9 (22.2)	77.8 (25.4)
Mean daily minimum °F (°C)	63.9 (17.7)	65.4 (18.6)	67.3 (19.6)	71.6 (22.0)	75.1 (23.9)	77.9 (25.5)	79.6 (26.4)	79.0 (26.1)	78.1 (25.6)	75.4 (24.1)	70.1 (21.2)	66.7 (19.3)	72.5 (22.5)
Mean minimum °F (°C)	47.9 (8.8)	50.0 (10.0)	54.9 (12.7)	60.5 (15.8)	68.4 (20.2)	71.5 (21.9)	73.0 (22.8)	72.6 (22.6)	72.5 (22.5)	67.7 (19.8)	58.3 (14.6)	52.0 (11.1)	45.2 (7.3)
Record low °F (°C)	35 (2)	39 (4)	40 (4)	51 (11)	61 (16)	65 (18)	69 (21)	66 (19)	66 (19)	55 (13)	42 (6)	35 (2)	35 (2)
Average precipitation inches (mm)	2.11 (54)	2.17 (55)	1.64 (42)	1.91 (49)	3.81 (97)	5.58 (142)	3.98 (101)	5.64 (143)	7.98 (203)	5.64 (143)	2.40 (61)	2.13 (54)	44.99 (1,143)
Average precipitation days (≥ 0.01 in)	5.6	4.4	5.2	4.8	5.8	11.1	9.4	12.4	13.3	11.7	6.0	6.4	96.1
Source: NOAA

== Demographics ==
Historical population
Census	Pop.	Note	%±
1980	1,834		—
1990	2,433		32.7%
2000	2,173		−10.7%
2010	2,136		−1.7%
2020	2,530		18.4%
U.S. Decennial Census

=== 2020 census ===
As of the 2020 census, Tavernier had a population of 2,530. The median age was 49.9 years; 14.7% of residents were under 18 and 23.7% were 65 or older. For every 100 females, there were 102.7 males, and for every 100 females 18 and over, there were 100.7 males 18 and over.

All of the residents lived in urban areas, whilenone lived in rural areas.

Of the 1,149 households in Tavernier, 22.3% had children under 18 living in them, 42.6% were married-couple households, 23.7% were households with a male householder and no spouse or partner present, and 23.5% were households with a female householder and no spouse or partner present. About 31.7% of all households were made up of individuals, and 14.4% had someone living alone who was 65 or older.

The CDP had 2,016 housing units, of which 43.0% were vacant. The homeowner vacancy rate was 4.1% and the rental vacancy rate was 12.3%.

Tavernier racial composition
Race	Number	Percentage
White (non-Hispanic)	1,595	63.04%
Black or African American (non-Hispanic)	25	0.99%
Native American	10	0.4%
Asian	17	0.67%
Other/mixed	62	2.45%
Hispanic or Latino	821	32.45%

=== 2000 census ===
In the 2000 census, 2,173 people resided in the CDP, making up 938 households, and 602 families. The population density was 321.5/km^{2} (832.1/mi^{2}). The 1,806 housing units had an average density of 267.2/km^{2} (691.6/mi^{2}). The racial makeup of the CDP was 96.78% White, 0.83% African American, 0.46% Native American, 0.32% Asian, 0.05% Pacific Islander, 0.78% from other races, and 0.78% from two or more races. Hispanics or Latinos of any race were 19.51% of the population.

Of the 938 households, 26.3% had children under 18 living with them, 50.6% were married couples living together, 8.1% had a female householder with no husband present, and 35.8% were not families. About 26.1% of all households were made up of individuals, and 7.8% had someone living alone who was 65 or older. The average household size was 2.29, and the average family size was 2.74.

In the CDP, 20.4% of the population was under 18, 4.8% were from 18 to 24, 28.3% were from 25 to 44, 31.0% were from 45 to 64, and 15.5% were 65 or older. The median age was 43 years. For every 100 females, there were 103.5 males. For every 100 females 18 and over, there were 102.8 males.

The median income in the CDP for a household was $40,881 and for a family was $46,141. Males had a median income of $30,221 versus $26,397 for females. The per capita income for the CDP was $22,592. About 7.3% of families and 9.9% of the population were below the poverty line, including 15.6% of those under 18 and 8.5% of those 65 or over.

== Education ==
Monroe County School District operates public schools.

Residents are zoned to Plantation Key School on Plantation Key.

Coral Shores High School in Islamorada has a Tavernier address.

== Notable people ==
- William O'Brien, 21st police chief of Miami
