= Port Largo Seaplane Base =

- IATA: KYL; ICAO: none

Summary
- Serves: Key Largo, Florida
- Location: Monroe County, Florida
- Elevation AMSL: 8 ft / 2 m
- Coordinates: 25°04′14″N 080°27′34″W

Map
- Location of the airport in Florida

The Port Largo Seaplane Base (IATA: KYL) is a seaplane base located 2 miles (3.2 km) southwest of Key Largo in Monroe County, Florida, United States.
