= Lower Matecumbe Key =

Island in Florida, United States

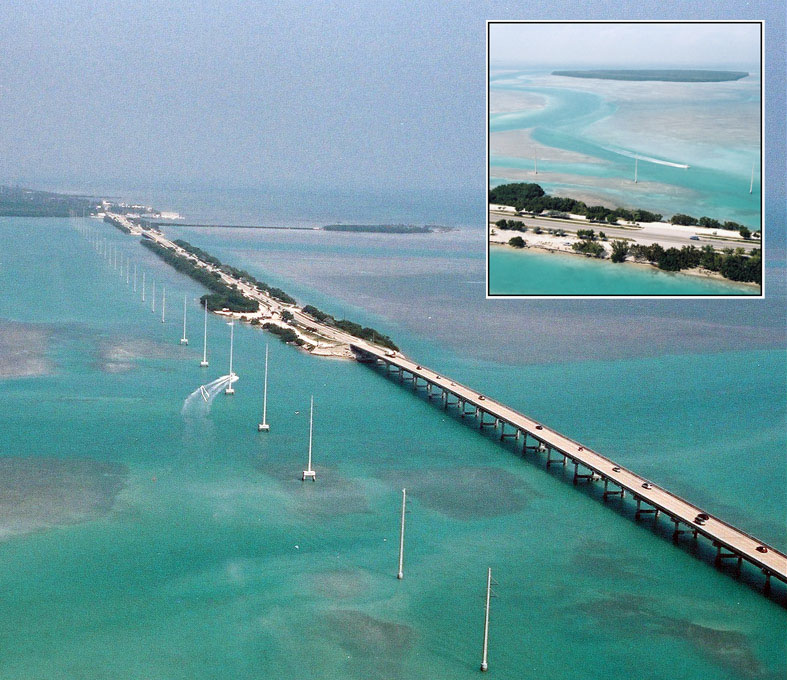
- Aerial view of the causeway and bridge just northeast of Lower Matecumbe Key. The southwestern tip of the Upper Matecumbe Key is in the upper left. Indian Key can be seen in the inset.

- Lower Matecumbe Key Lower Matecumbe Key (the Caribbean)

Geography
- Location: Gulf of Mexico
- Coordinates: 24.866°N 80.712°W

Administration
- United States
- State: Florida
- County: Monroe

Lower Matecumbe Key is an island in the upper Florida Keys, United States, located on U.S. 1 between mile markers 73–78.

All of the key is within the Village of Islamorada as of November 4, 1997, when it was incorporated.

It is home to the main base of the Florida National High Adventure Sea Base.

The island lies to the southwest of Upper Matecumbe Key, and to the northeast of Craig Key.

This key is the site of a number of Indian mounds and middens, most of which were destroyed during the building of the Overseas Railroad. A number of natural wells were also located here, at the northeast end of the key. These wells were well known to early seafaring men as the most reliable source of fresh water in the Keys. They, too were destroyed during the railroad era, and the location of their site has been lost. The southwestern end of the key is the site of a former sand mining operation.

== Tourist attractions ==
A local attraction is Anne's Beach, located at mile marker 74 on the east side (oceanside) of the roadway.

== Education ==
It is in the Monroe County School District. The zoned K-8 is Plantation Key School on Plantation Key.
