= Key Largo School =

Coordinates: 25.153032°N 80.387484°W

- Key Largo, Monroe, Florida 33037; United States

Information
- Superintendent: Edward C. Tierney
- Principal: Darren Pais
- Staff: 60.00 (FTE)
- Grades: K through 8th
- Enrollment: 841 (2019-20)
- Student to teacher ratio: 14.02
- Colors: Blue and Gold and White
- Mascot: Tornados
- Rival: Plantation Key School
- Website: Key Largo School

Key Largo School, located on mile marker 105, is a public K-8 school in Key Largo, Florida, within the Monroe County School District.

KLS was designated a Blue Ribbon School of Excellence under principal Frankie St. James. and is listed as one of the Top 50 Schools in the State of Florida. Grade levels are K through 8th Grade and are headed by Principal Darren Pais. As of 2006, KLS had 995 students. Their mascot is the Tornado and their school colors are Blue and Gold. The school was designated an Advancement Via Individual Determination (AVID) National Demonstration School under principal Laura Lietaert in 2019 signifying it as a model school and one of the top AVID schools in the nation.

The school officially opened in 1972 after being scheduled to open in 1971. Businesses in the Key Largo community housed different grade level groups of students from August until January when the new building was ready to open its doors. In 2008, the original elementary school building was demolished and a new building that would fit all grades K-8 was constructed. The old middle school building now accommodates electives.
