= Tony Bryant =

American football player (born 1976)

No. 94, 92
- Position: Defensive end

Personal information
- Born: September 3, 1976 (age 50); Marathon, Florida, U.S.
- Listed height: 6 ft 6 in (1.98 m)
- Listed weight: 282 lb (128 kg)

Career information
- High school: Marathon
- College: Florida State
- NFL draft: 1999: 2nd round, 40th overall pick

Career history
- Oakland Raiders (1999–2002); New Orleans Saints (2003–2005); St. Louis Rams (2006)

Awards and highlights
- Second-team All-ACC (1998)
- Stats at Pro Football Reference

Tony Bryant (born September 3, 1976) is an American former professional football player who was a defensive end who played in the National Football League (NFL) for the Oakland Raiders from 1999 to 2002 and the New Orleans Saints from 2003 to 2005. He played college football for the Florida State Seminoles.

== High school ==
Bryant was born and raised in Marathon, Florida. He attended Marathon High School and played for the Marathon Dolphin football team where he received many of awards including Best All-Around Athlete, All American Defensive End, First-team All State, Monroe County Player of the Year, and All County Team. Tony was honored at Marathon High School on October 31, 2008, when his jersey number 45 was retired.

== College ==
Bryant attended Copiah-Lincoln Community College for two years. While there he earned his Associate of Arts degree in Child Development. He also played football and earned honors including being named an All-American Defensive End and NJCAA Most Valuable Player. He was also the No.6 Junior College Prospect, and Top Junior College Player. After attending Copian Lincoln Junior College he went on to attend Florida State University. There he recorded 14 career sacks and 87 tackles. He was also named to the All-ACC 2nd team.

== Professional career ==
He was picked with the ninth pick in the second round of the 1999 NFL draft by the Oakland Raiders. He played for the Raiders from 1999 to 2002. There he recorded 92 solo tackles, 35 assists, 17 sacks, and 1 safety. He was also part of the Raiders Super Bowl season in 2002. In 2003, he signed with the New Orleans Saints, and played there until 2005. After the Saints he went to the St. Louis Rams in 2006.
