= Marathon Middle High School =

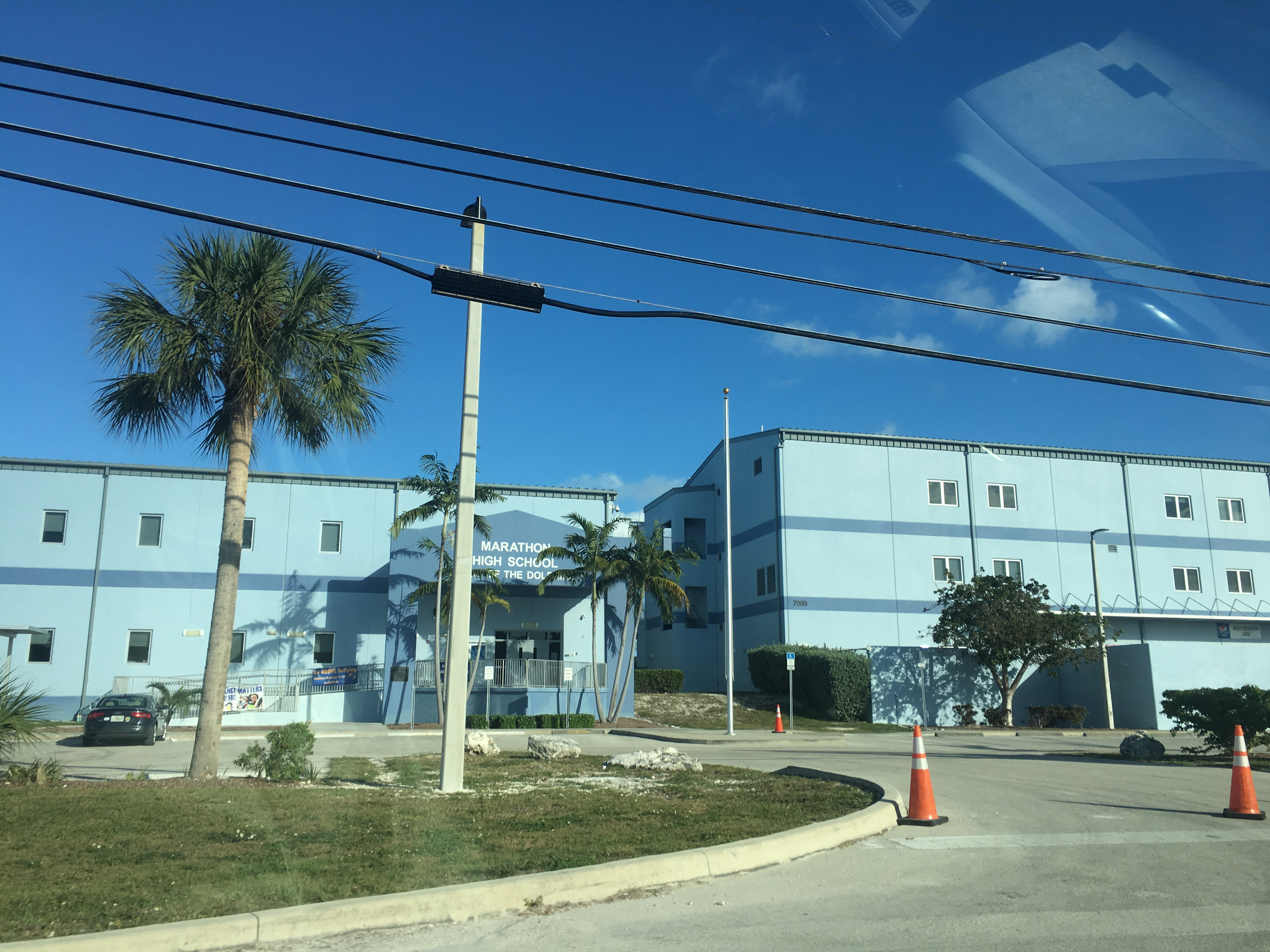

Location
- 350 Sombrero Beach Road; Marathon, Florida 33050; United States
- Coordinates: 24°42′15″N 81°04′41″W

Information
- Type: Public middle school and high school
- Established: 1957
- School district: Monroe County School District
- Superintendent: Edward C. Tierney
- Principal: Christine Paul
- Teaching staff: 45.00 (FTE) (2022–23)
- Grades: 6–12
- Gender: Co-educational
- Enrollment: 707 (2022–23)
- Student to teacher ratio: 15.71 (2022–23)
- Campus: Remote town
- Colors: Blue; Gold; White
- Athletics conference: FHSAA Division 32, District 18
- Sports: baseball; basketball; cross country; football; golf; soccer; softball; tennis; track and field; volleyball; weightlifting
- Mascot: Dolphins
- Newspaper: Dolphin Pride
- Website: www.keysschools.com/o/mmhs

Marathon Middle High School is a public middle school and high school in Marathon, Florida in the Florida Keys. It is within the Monroe County School District.

== Notable alumni ==
- Tony Bryant – American football player
