= Ran Carthon =

American football player and executive (born 1981)

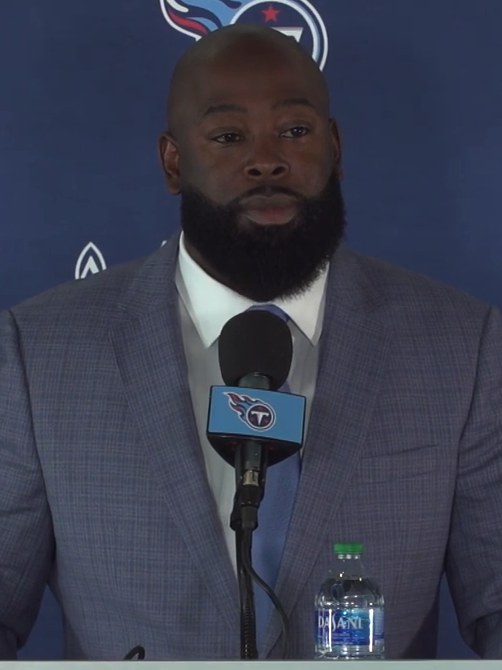
- Carthon as Tennessee Titans general manager, 2023

No. 35
- Position: Running back

Personal information
- Born: February 10, 1981 (age 45); Osceola, Arkansas, U.S.
- Listed height: 6 ft 0 in (1.83 m)
- Listed weight: 218 lb (99 kg)

Career information
- High school: Key West (Key West, Florida)
- College: Florida (2000–2003)
- NFL draft: 2004: undrafted

Career history

Playing
- Indianapolis Colts (2004)*; Dallas Cowboys (2004)*; Indianapolis Colts (2004–2005); Green Bay Packers (2005)*; Seattle Seahawks (2006)*; Indianapolis Colts (2006); Detroit Lions (2006)*
- * Offseason or practice squad member only

Operations
- Atlanta Falcons (2008–2011) Pro scout; St. Louis / Los Angeles Rams (2012–2016) Director of player personnel; San Francisco 49ers (2017–2020) Director of pro personnel; San Francisco 49ers (2021–2022) Director of player personnel; Tennessee Titans (2023) General manager; Tennessee Titans (2024) Executive vice president and general manager

Career NFL statistics
- Rushing yards: 22
- Rushing average: 1.4
- Rushing touchdowns: 2
- Stats at Pro Football Reference
- Executive profile at Pro Football Reference

Arandric Kornell "Ran" Carthon (born February 10, 1981) is an American professional football executive and former running back. He previously served as an executive for the San Francisco 49ers, St. Louis / Los Angeles Rams, and Atlanta Falcons, and was the general manager of the Tennessee Titans in 2023 and 2024.

Carthon played college football at Florida and signed as an undrafted free agent with the Indianapolis Colts in 2004. He played for three seasons in the NFL with the Colts and Detroit Lions. He is the son of former NFL running back Maurice Carthon.

== Early life ==
Carthon was born in Osceola, Arkansas. His father is former NFL running back Maurice Carthon. He attended Key West High School in Key West, Florida, and played for the Key West Conchs high school football team. As a junior, he rushed for over 1,300 yards; as a senior, he rushed for over 500 yards and was named to PrepStar's All-Region team, despite missing seven games with an ankle injury.

== Playing career ==
=== College ===
Carthon accepted an athletic scholarship to attend the University of Florida in Gainesville, Florida, where he played for coach Steve Spurrier and coach Ron Zook's Florida Gators football teams from 2000 to 2003. As a senior in 2003, he was the leading rusher for the Gators. Carthon is a member of Phi Beta Sigma fraternity.

After his NFL career was over, he returned to Gainesville, and graduated from the University of Florida with a bachelor's degree in sociology in 2008.

=== National Football League ===
Pre-draft measurables
Height	Weight	Arm length	Hand span	40-yard dash	10-yard split	20-yard split	20-yard shuttle	Three-cone drill	Vertical jump	Broad jump	Bench press
5 ft 11 3/8 in (1.81 m)	224 lb (102 kg)	29 1/2 in (0.75 m)	9 5/8 in (0.24 m)	4.53 s	1.55 s	2.60 s	4.12 s	7.02 s	37.5 in (0.95 m)	9 ft 6 in (2.90 m)	22 reps

==== Indianapolis Colts ====
The Indianapolis Colts signed Carthon as an undrafted free agent in 2004, and he was a member of the Colts from 2004 to 2006. He saw no action during the 2004 regular season, and only limited action in nine games as a running back and kick returner during the 2005 and 2006 regular seasons.

==== Detroit Lions ====
Carthon finished his career with the Detroit Lions during the second half of the 2006 season.

== Executive career ==
=== Atlanta Falcons ===
After retiring, Carthon was hired by the Atlanta Falcons as a pro scout in 2008. He spent the next four seasons in Atlanta.

=== St. Louis / Los Angeles Rams ===
In 2012, Carthon was hired by the St. Louis Rams as their director of player personnel.

=== San Francisco 49ers ===
In 2017, Carthon was hired by the San Francisco 49ers as their director of pro personnel. He was promoted to director of player personnel in 2021.

=== Tennessee Titans ===
Carthon was hired by the Tennessee Titans as their general manager in January 2023. He was given the additional title of executive vice president in January 2024, having oversight of all football operations. He was fired on January 7, 2025.
