= Coral Shores High School =

Secondary school in Florida, United States

Coordinates: 24.9940°N 80.5374°W

Location
- 89901 Old Highway; Tavernier, (Monroe County), Florida 33070; United States

Information
- Type: Public high school
- School district: Monroe County School District
- Principal: Laura Lietaert
- Staff: 44.00 (FTE)
- Enrollment: 753 (2024–25)
- Student to teacher ratio: 17.11
- Colors: Gold and green
- Nickname: Hurricanes

Coral Shores High School is a senior high school in Islamorada, Florida, United States, with a Tavernier postal address. It is one of the two high schools of the Monroe County School District.

== History ==
Serving as a precursor to Coral Shores High School, Rock Harbor and Tavernier schools consolidated in 1939. As the population of the Upper Keys grew, concerns about education accessibility grew. In 1948, parents and communities petitioned the school board for a high school. In September 1949, the board proposed a school bond issue for $500,000. The school bond issue was approved.

The name "Coral Shores” was selected after Horace O'Bryant, Superintendent of Public Instruction of Monroe County, encouraged citizens of the Upper Keys to submit names for the new school. Sally Jinette, a student from Greyhound Key, submitted the winning name. On Plantation Key in 1951, the Coral Shores School opened the "A" wing with six classrooms and six teachers serving grades 1 through 11. Following the addition of 12th grade in 1952, the school was formally dedicated as Coral Shores High School.

In September 1955, a one-room house was moved to Newport for the Black population. A new school building was supposed to be constructed; however, not without a few problems. On April 28, 1955, The Florida Keys News reported that a relocation petition began to circulate in the Key Largo area regarding the potential Black School. A used house was eventually moved to the Newport property. This became the Burlington Grammar School, serving grades 9 through 12, and was located in front of the current Key Largo Mosquito Control building. In February 1965, Monroe County ordered integration of all its schools. Burlington School was closed and its students transferred to Coral Shores. Andrew Fowler was the first black Coral Shores graduate in 1966.

In September 2017, Hurricane Irma temporarily disrupted operations. As of 2018 it had fewer than 800 students.
