= Key West High School =

Public high school in Key West, Florida, United States

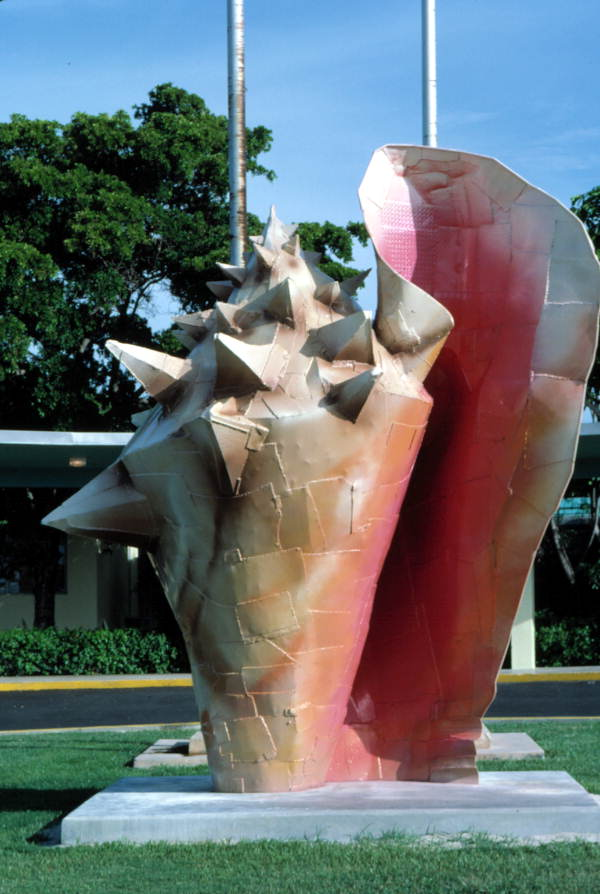
- Student made sculpture in front of the school

Location
- 2100 Flagler Avenue; Key West, Florida 33040; United States; 24.554559°N 81.777217°W

Information
- Other name: KWHS
- Type: Public high school
- Established: 1906
- School district: Monroe County School District
- NCES School ID: 120132001294
- Principal: Rebecca Palomino
- Teaching staff: 77.00 (on an FTE basis)
- Grades: 9–12
- Enrollment: 1,337 (2024-2025)
- Student to teacher ratio: 17.36
- Colors: Crimson and Grey
- Mascot: Fighting Conch
- Nickname: Conchs
- Newspaper: The Snapper
- Website: www.keysschools.com/o/kwhs

Key West High School (KWHS) is a public high school in Key West, Florida, United States. It is part of the Monroe County School District. The school opened in 1906, and was originally located at the site of the current Key West City Hall. It served as a last resort shelter during Hurricane Irma in 2017.

== Extracurricular activities ==
The school has various clubs including NJROTC, GSA (Gay Straight Alliance), Choir (Misty's, VIPS, Concert, and Freshman), Band (Marching, Concert, Jazz), National Honor Society and Beta Club.

== Notable alumni ==
- Vic Albury, former Major League Baseball pitcher
- Ran Carthon, former Indianapolis Colts running back and Tennessee Titans general manager
- Robert Fuller, actor, known for his roles on many shows, including Laramie and Emergency.
- Khalil Greene, former Clemson Tigers baseball third baseman and Major League Baseball shortstop
- George Mira, former San Francisco 49ers quarterback
- Boog Powell, former Major League Baseball First Baseman
- Mekhi Sargent, former Iowa Hawkeyes football running back, National Football League running back
- Carl Taylor, former Major League Baseball catcher

== Gallery ==
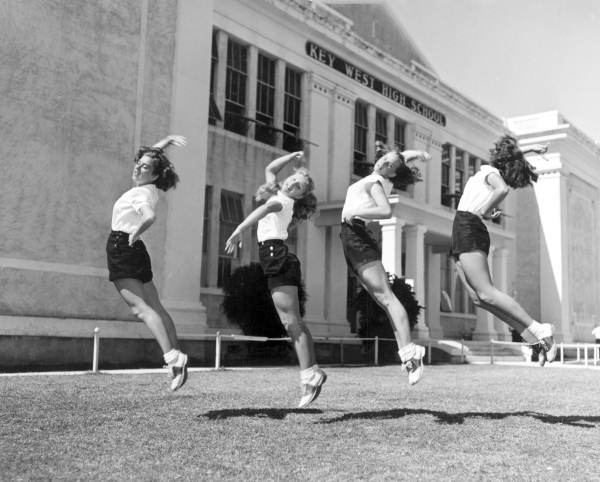
Key West High School Cheerleaders, 1947.

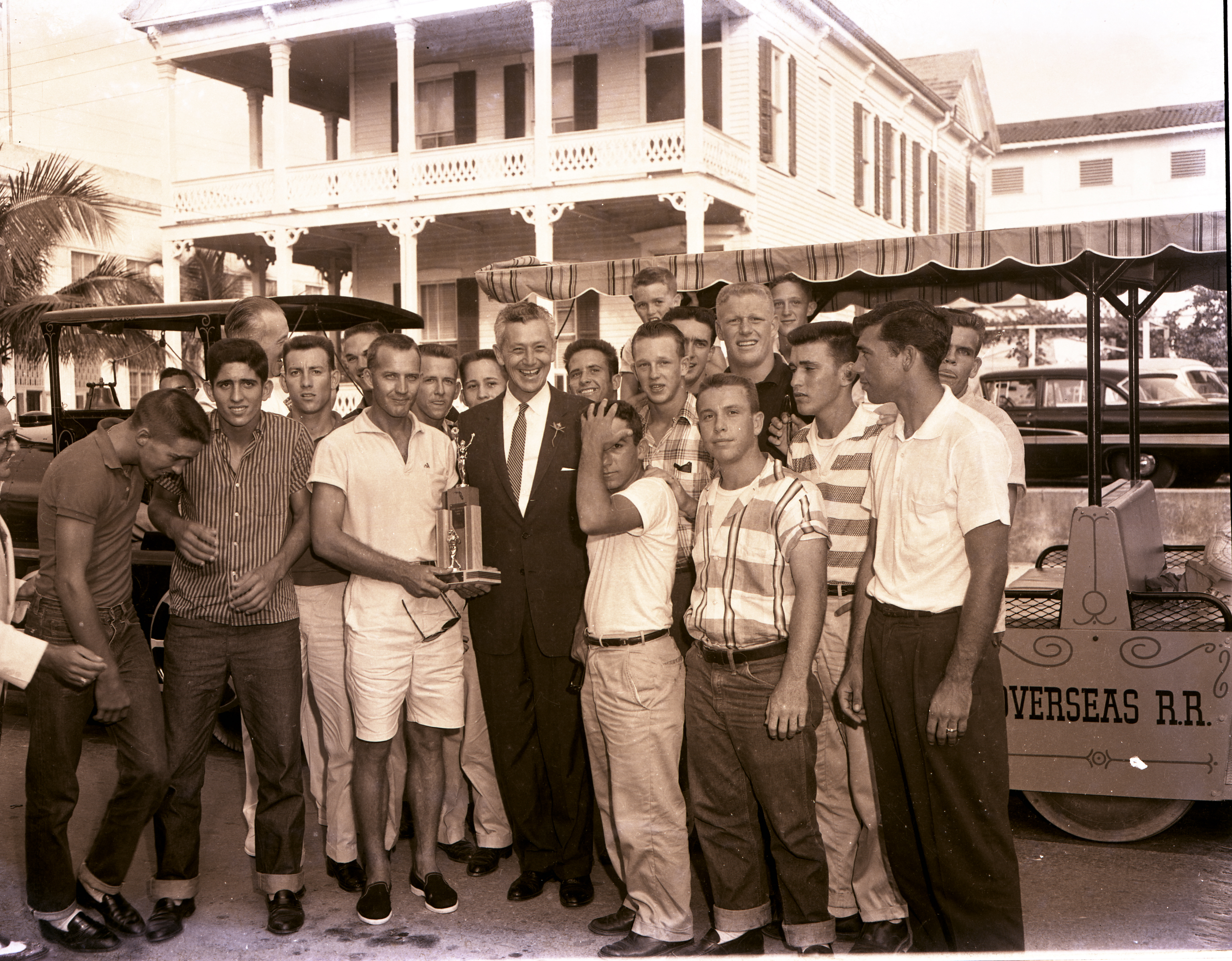
Governor Leroy Collins with Key West High School baseball team, c. 1959.

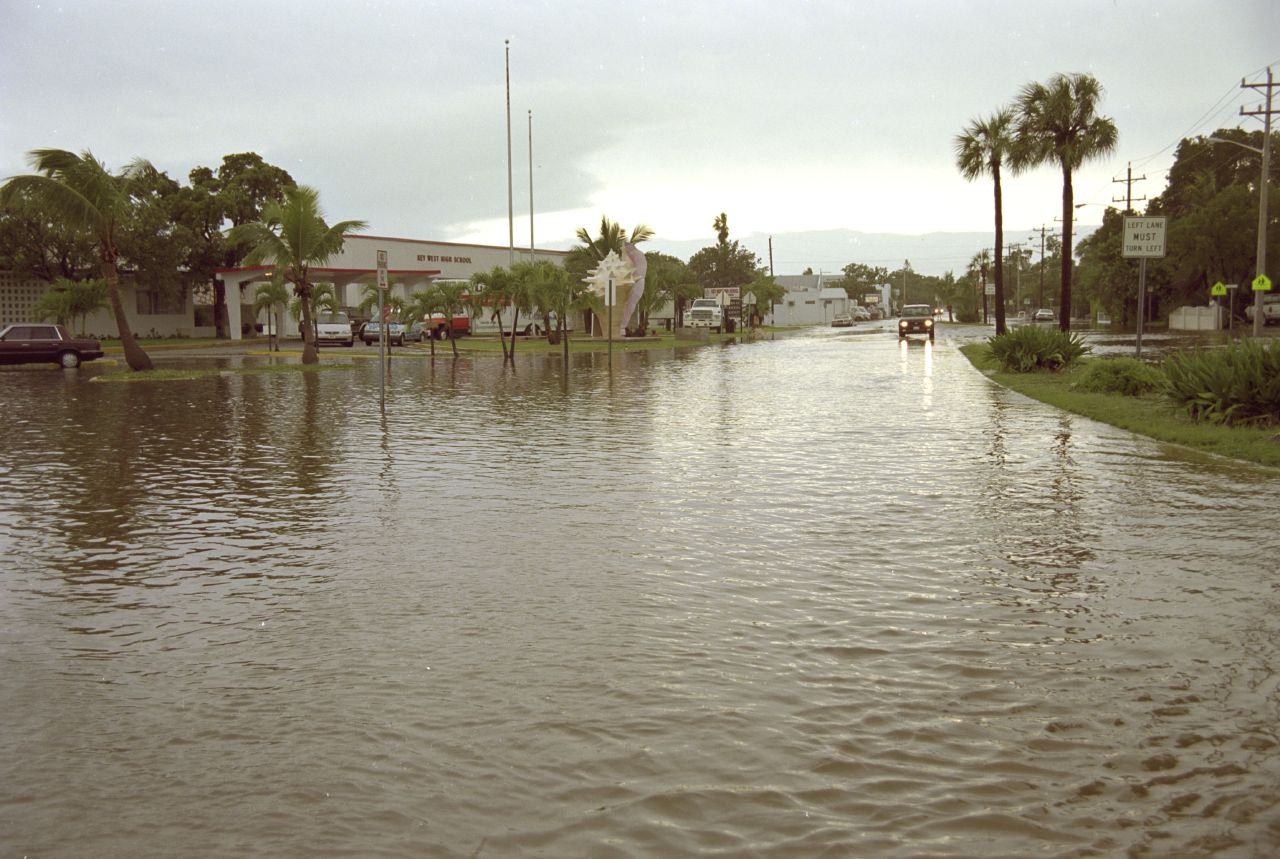
Flooding outside the school after Hurricane Georges, 1998.

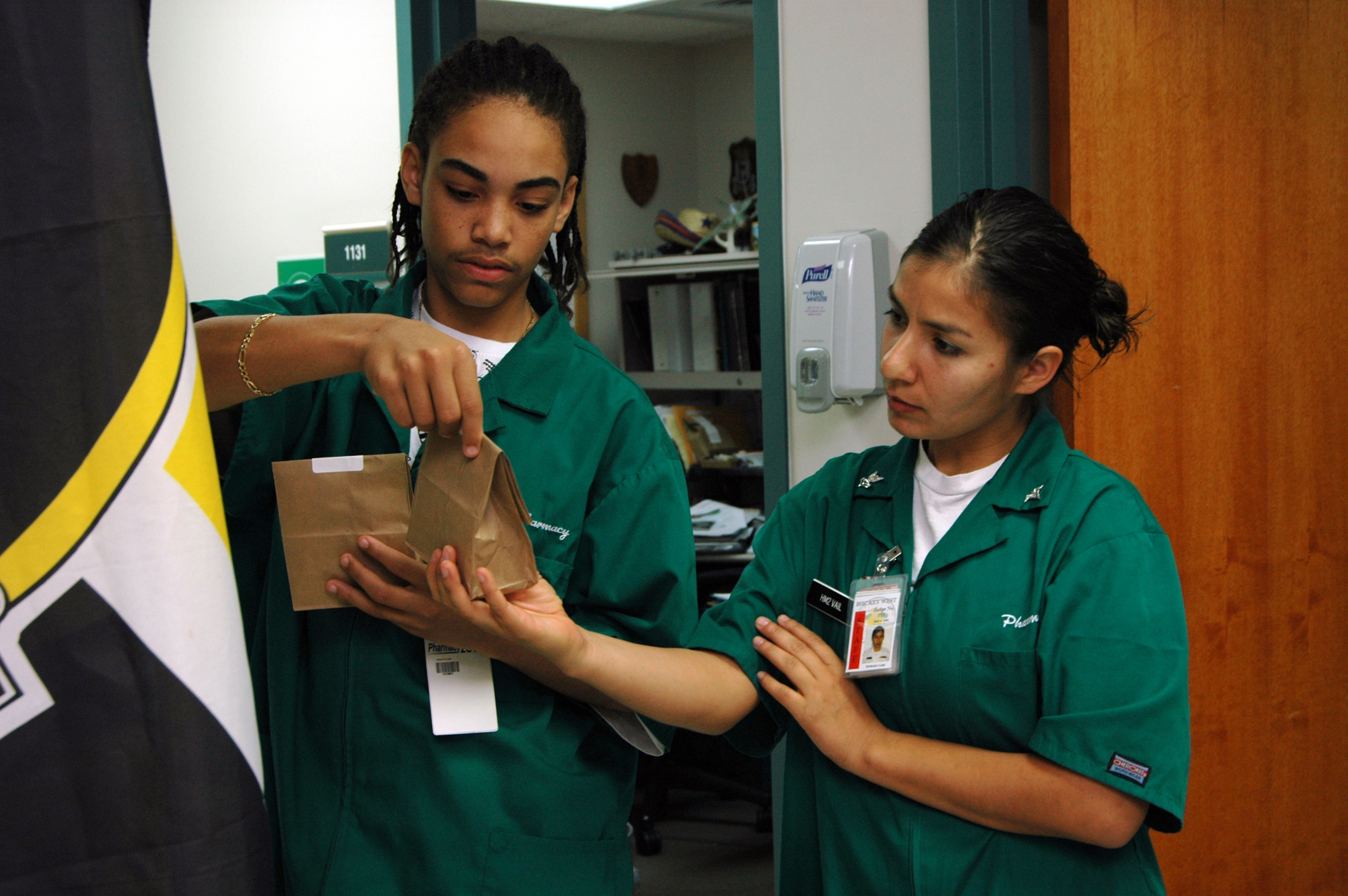
Student doing hands on training at a medical clinic.
