= Anne's Beach =

Protected area of Florida, United States

Coordinates: 24.863543°N 80.716038°W

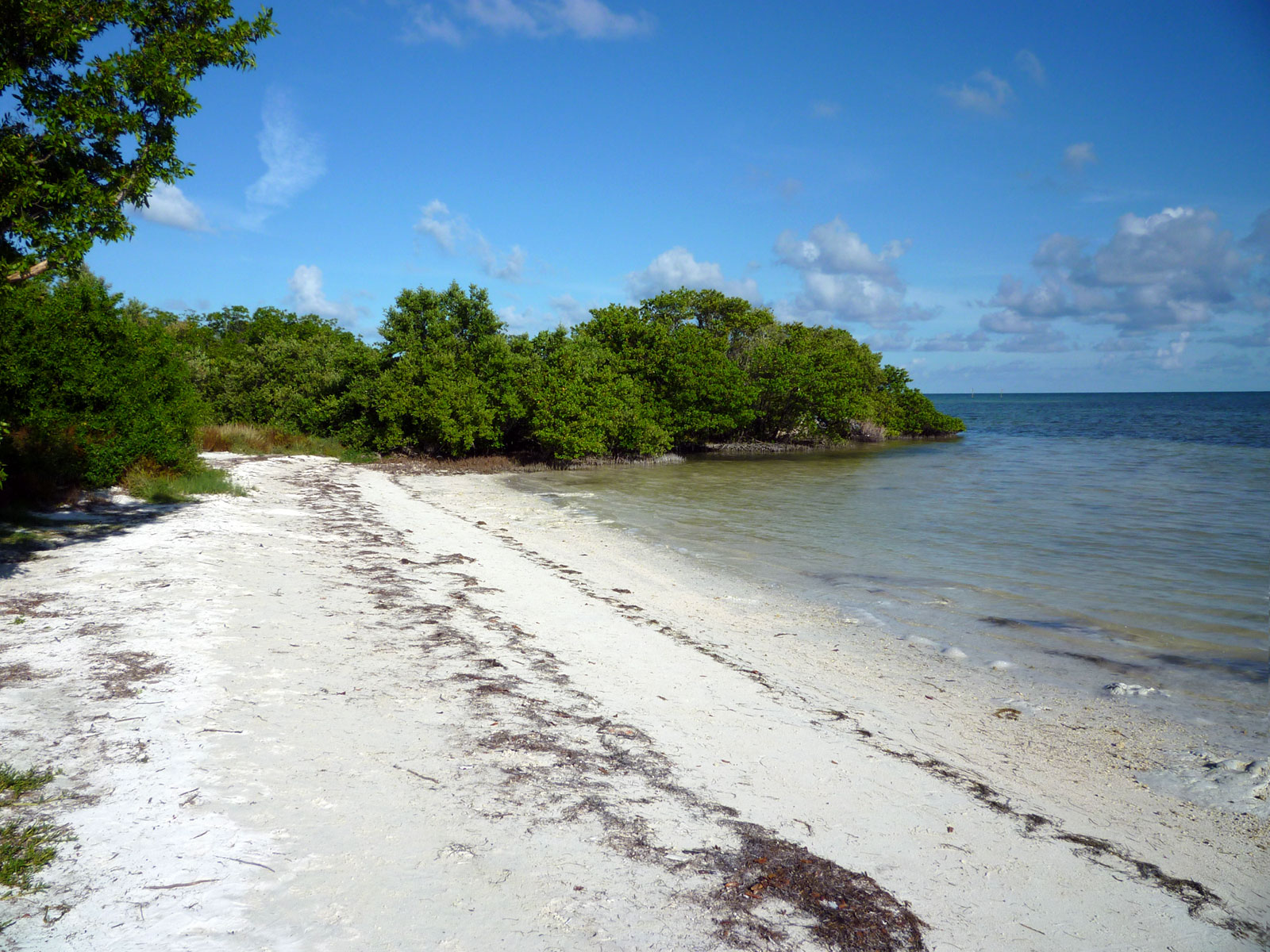
A view of Anne's Beach

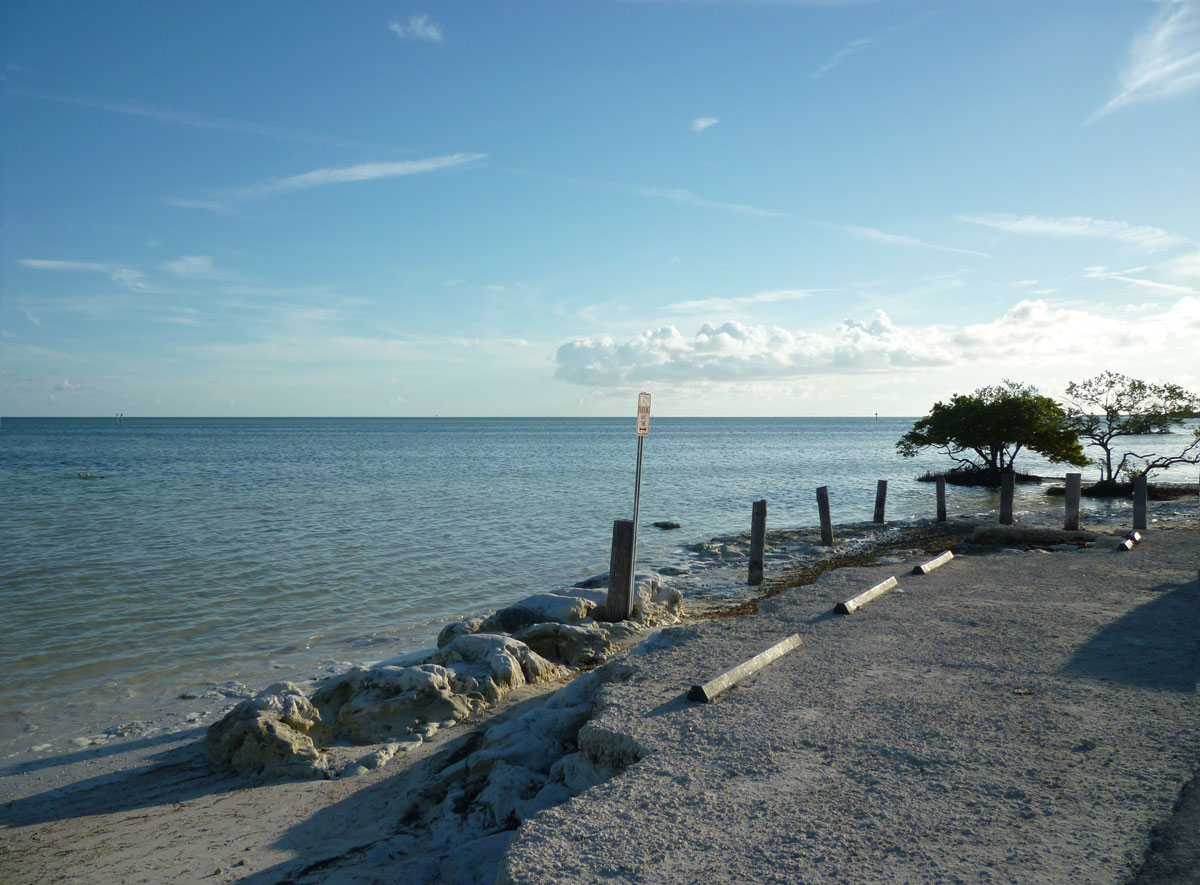
A view of Anne's Beach in the opposite direction overlooking a parking lot

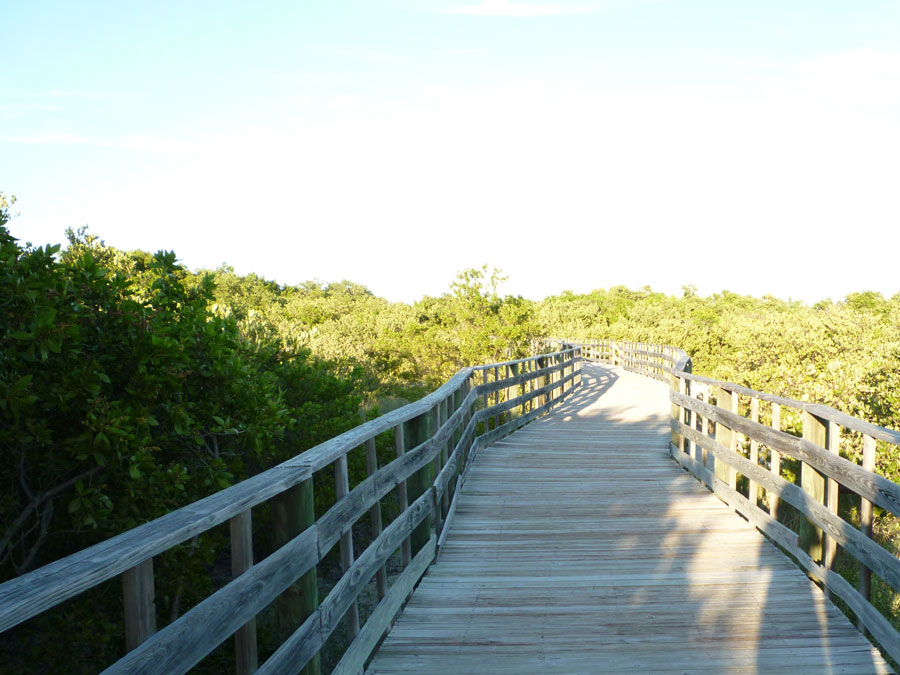
A broadwalk connects two parking lots at Anne's Beach Park

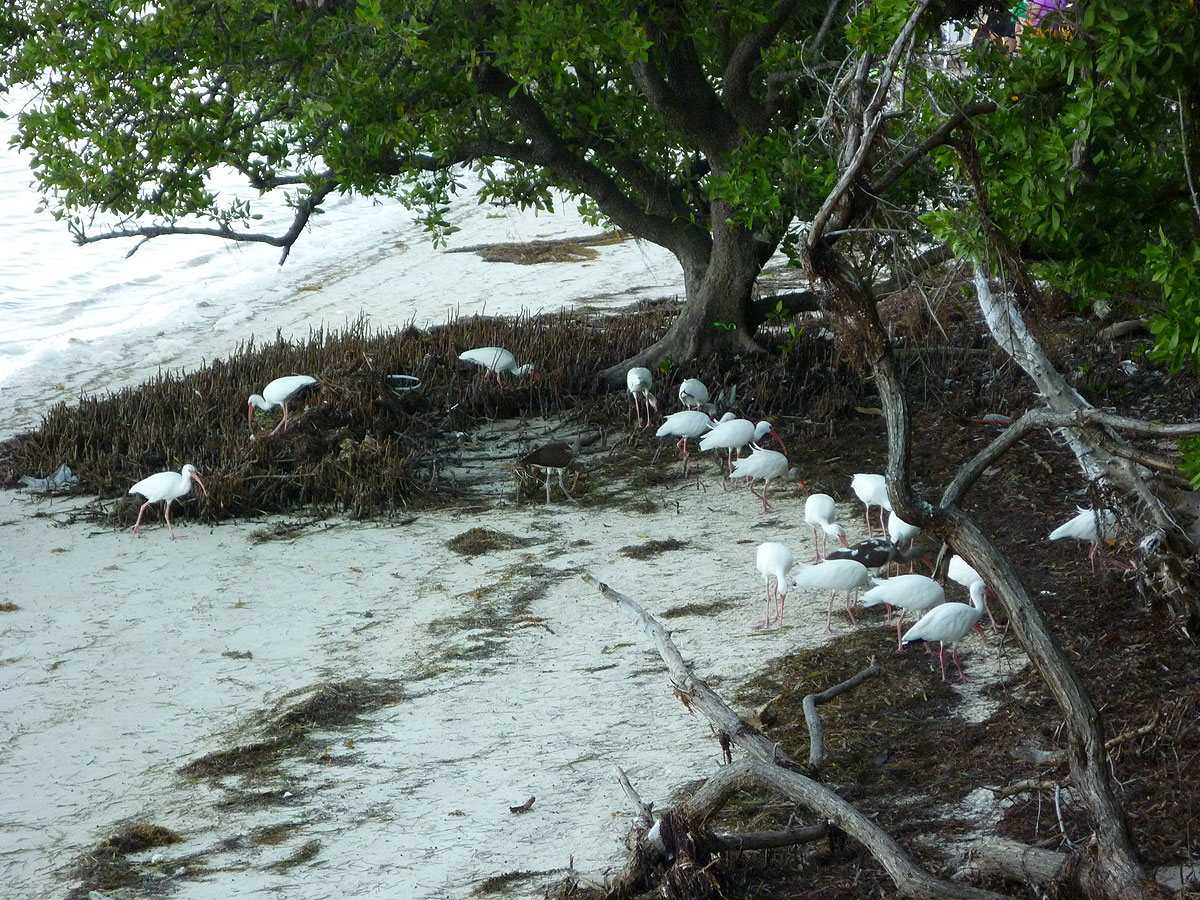
Anne's Beach is a birdwatching site

Anne's Beach is located at Lower Matecumbe Key, Florida. The Islamorada Beach is dedicated to local environmentalist Anne Eaton. There are 2 parking lots approximately 1/4 mile (0.40 km) apart on US-1 at MM 73. Anne's Beach features a shallow swimming area, covered picnic tables, boardwalk and bathroom facilities.

This Keys Beach is located on the Atlantic Ocean, but there is almost no wave action, due to the wide expanse of shallow water typical for Florida Keys beaches.

Typical of Anne's Beach is the shallow and warm to very warm waters all year around. The sandbar is composed entirely of calcium carbonate.

Fully replaced after being destroyed by Hurricane Irma (2017), Anne's Beach reopened on August 23, 2019. Three hundred feet of boardwalk, six pavilions, and a restroom are all available and located at the north parking lot. Dogs are permitted but must be leashed. No motor boats or personal water craft are allowed. No open flame or grill; no fishing.

Anne's Beach is a popular destination for kiteboarders, and due to its wide expanse of shallow water, it presents a good learning environment for beginning kiteboarders.

== Who is Anne's Beach named after? ==
A teacher by profession, Anne Eaton spent her life in a wheelchair after being paralyzed by polio at age 24. At age 35, she married Cyrus S. Eaton, a 74-year-old Ohio millionaire, founder of the Republic Steel Corporation, who was an outspoken advocate of nuclear disarmament.

She fell in love with the Florida Keys in the 1960s, bought an old frame house built of Dade County pine and became deeply involved with life in the Keys, where she eventually made a permanent home. She actively campaigned against overdevelopment of the Keys and helped raise funds for the preservation of this stretch of beach as a county park. When she died in 1992, it was named after her.
