= William O'Brien (police officer) =

American police officer

William O'Brien (March 10, 1944 – March 3, 2016) was an American police officer who served as the 21st police chief of Miami, Florida, from 1998 until 2000. O'Brien served as a Miami Police Department police officer for more than 25 years, including 18 years as a member of the city's SWAT team and two years as chief. He resigned as chief on April 28, 2000, in the aftermath of the Elián González custody battle raid. The resignation has been studied as a case in criminal justice and political ethics. He was highly critical of the Miami mayor's handling of the situation, leading to his forced resignation.

Bill O'Brien, who was raised in La Grange, Illinois, first moved to Miami to study political science at the University of Miami. He then joined the United States Air Force for five years, during which he piloted C-130 Hercules in combat during the Vietnam War. O'Brien sought to become a professional pilot after the war, but could not find a job in the field during the oil embargo in 1973. Instead, O'Brien became a police officer, despite his dislike of guns.

O'Brien died from throat cancer at his home in Tavernier, Florida, on March 3, 2016, at the age of 71.
