= Key Largo, Florida =

- Census-designated place
- Location in Monroe County and the state of Florida

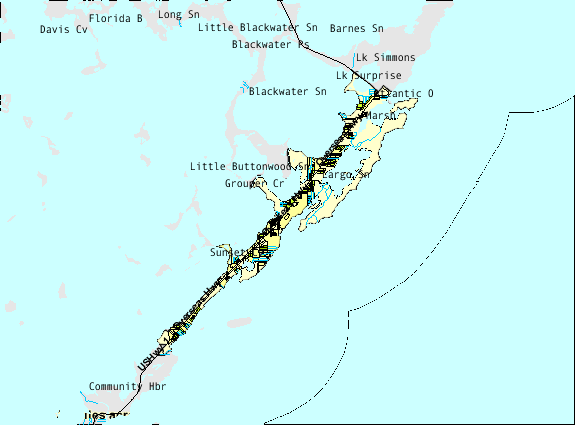
- U.S. Census Bureau map showing CDP boundaries
- Coordinates: 25°07′25″N 80°25′48″W
- Country: United States
- State: Florida
- County: Monroe

Area
  - Total: 15.25 sq mi (39.49 km^{2})
  - Land: 12.05 sq mi (31.21 km^{2})
  - Water: 3.19 sq mi (8.27 km^{2})
- Elevation: 7 ft (2.1 m)

Population (2020)
  - Total: 12,447
  - Density: 1,032.9/sq mi (398.79/km^{2})
- Time zone: UTC-5 (Eastern (EST))
  - Summer (DST): UTC-4 (EDT)
- ZIP code: 33037
- Area code: 305
- FIPS code: 12-36375
- GNIS feature ID: 2403172

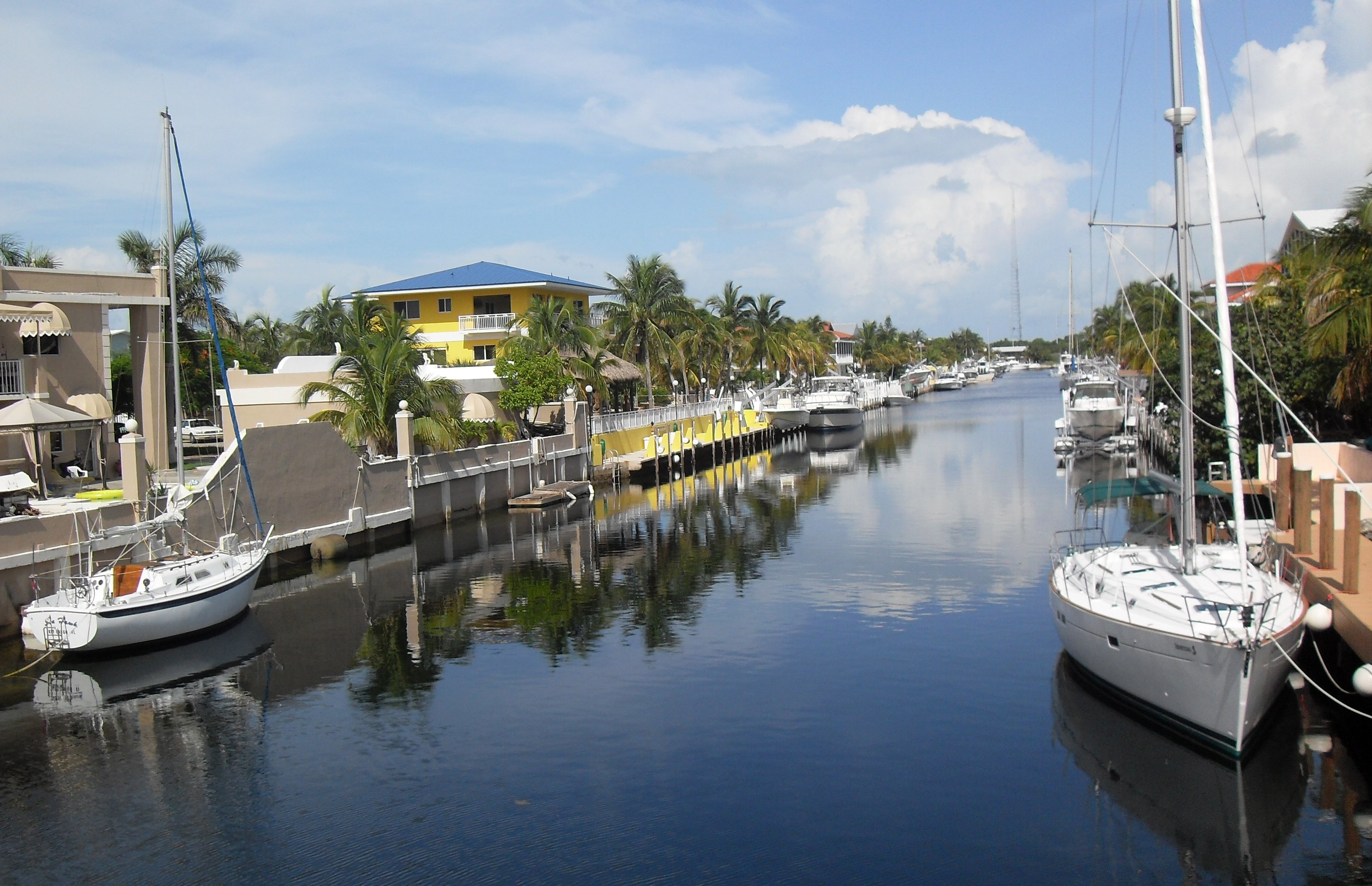
Key Largo harbor

Key Largo is an unincorporated area and census-designated place in Monroe County, Florida, United States, located on the island of Key Largo in the upper Florida Keys. The population was 12,447 at the 2020 census, up from 10,433 in 2010. The name comes from the Spanish Cayo Largo, or "long key". It is both the first island and town of the Florida Keys to be reached from the Overseas Highway to Key West. It was also the location of one of the stations of the Overseas Railroad.

== Geography ==
Key Largo shares the island of Key Largo with Tavernier to the southwest and North Key Largo to the northeast. U.S. Route 1, the Overseas Highway, runs the length of the community, leading north 57 miles (92 km) to Miami and southwest 97 miles (156 km) to Key West.

According to the United States Census Bureau, the CDP has a total area of 15.2 square miles (39 km^{2}), of which 12.0 square miles (31 km^{2}) are land and 3.2 square miles (8.3 km^{2}), or 20.96%, are water.

Key Largo is the location of the first undersea park in the United States, established in 1963, and called the John Pennekamp Coral Reef State Park (located at Mile Marker 102). The park is primarily offshore and stretches 3 miles (5 km) into the Atlantic Ocean and is 25 miles (40 km) long. Adjacent to this is the Florida Keys National Marine Sanctuary covering 178 square nautical miles. Both areas were designed to protect marine life, including the extensive coral reefs in the area.

=== Climate ===
According to the Köppen climate classification, Key Largo has a tropical monsoon climate (Am).

Climate data for John Pennekamp State Park, Florida, 1991–2020 normals, extremes 2004–present
Month	Jan	Feb	Mar	Apr	May	Jun	Jul	Aug	Sep	Oct	Nov	Dec	Year
Record high °F (°C)	85 (29)	89 (32)	88 (31)	93 (34)	93 (34)	94 (34)	95 (35)	93 (34)	93 (34)	91 (33)	88 (31)	86 (30)	95 (35)
Mean maximum °F (°C)	81.9 (27.7)	83.1 (28.4)	85.2 (29.6)	87.3 (30.7)	88.7 (31.5)	91.0 (32.8)	91.9 (33.3)	92.0 (33.3)	90.9 (32.7)	89.0 (31.7)	85.2 (29.6)	83.3 (28.5)	92.9 (33.8)
Mean daily maximum °F (°C)	76.2 (24.6)	78.0 (25.6)	79.7 (26.5)	82.5 (28.1)	85.1 (29.5)	88.1 (31.2)	89.8 (32.1)	90.1 (32.3)	88.8 (31.6)	85.9 (29.9)	81.4 (27.4)	78.1 (25.6)	83.6 (28.7)
Daily mean °F (°C)	69.4 (20.8)	71.2 (21.8)	73.2 (22.9)	76.6 (24.8)	79.7 (26.5)	82.6 (28.1)	84.1 (28.9)	84.5 (29.2)	83.3 (28.5)	80.6 (27.0)	75.7 (24.3)	71.9 (22.2)	77.7 (25.4)
Mean daily minimum °F (°C)	62.6 (17.0)	64.5 (18.1)	66.8 (19.3)	70.7 (21.5)	74.2 (23.4)	77.2 (25.1)	78.5 (25.8)	78.8 (26.0)	77.8 (25.4)	75.3 (24.1)	69.9 (21.1)	65.8 (18.8)	71.8 (22.1)
Mean minimum °F (°C)	45.9 (7.7)	49.3 (9.6)	52.3 (11.3)	60.1 (15.6)	66.6 (19.2)	71.5 (21.9)	72.9 (22.7)	72.7 (22.6)	72.1 (22.3)	65.7 (18.7)	57.1 (13.9)	52.2 (11.2)	43.2 (6.2)
Record low °F (°C)	34 (1)	38 (3)	44 (7)	52 (11)	60 (16)	68 (20)	70 (21)	71 (22)	65 (18)	54 (12)	46 (8)	37 (3)	34 (1)
Average precipitation inches (mm)	2.13 (54)	2.01 (51)	2.22 (56)	3.33 (85)	4.76 (121)	7.91 (201)	5.81 (148)	6.89 (175)	8.18 (208)	7.87 (200)	3.31 (84)	2.53 (64)	56.95 (1,447)
Average precipitation days (≥ 0.01 in)	7.5	6.2	5.1	6.7	7.1	10.9	13.0	14.5	16.1	11.6	8.9	7.9	115.5
Source: NOAA (mean maxima/minima, precip days 2006–2020)

== Demographics ==
Historical population
Census	Pop.	Note	%±
1970	2,866		—
1980	7,447		159.8%
1990	11,336		52.2%
2000	12,971		14.4%
2010	10,433		−19.6%
2020	12,447		19.3%

=== 2020 census ===
As of the 2020 census, Key Largo had a population of 12,447. The median age was 51.1 years. 15.4% of residents were under the age of 18 and 23.6% of residents were 65 years of age or older. For every 100 females there were 103.2 males, and for every 100 females age 18 and over there were 104.0 males age 18 and over.

97.1% of residents lived in urban areas, while 2.9% lived in rural areas.

There were 5,506 households in Key Largo, of which 20.7% had children under the age of 18 living in them. Of all households, 48.9% were married-couple households, 21.9% were households with a male householder and no spouse or partner present, and 20.1% were households with a female householder and no spouse or partner present. About 28.5% of all households were made up of individuals and 12.8% had someone living alone who was 65 years of age or older.

There were 8,903 housing units, of which 38.2% were vacant. The homeowner vacancy rate was 3.5% and the rental vacancy rate was 17.3%.

Key Largo racial composition
Race	Number	Percentage
White (non-Hispanic)	8,012	64.37%
Black or African American (non-Hispanic)	213	1.71%
Native American	19	0.15%
Asian	115	0.92%
Pacific Islander	8	0.06%
Other/Mixed	397	3.19%
Hispanic or Latino	3,683	29.59%

=== Income and poverty ===
The average income for a household in the CDP was $42,577, and the median income for a family was $50,755. Males had a median income of $33,588 versus $25,468 for females. The per capita income for the CDP was $25,441. About 5.9% of families and 8.3% of the population were below the poverty line, including 8.7% of those under age 18 and 7.8% of those age 65 or over.

== Education ==
The Monroe County School District operates the Key Largo School.

The Roman Catholic Archdiocese of Miami formerly operated the Saint Justin Martyr, Academy of Marine Science (PK-9) school in Key Largo.

== Notable people ==
- Dick Rutkowski, founder of IANTD
- A. J. Paterson, soccer player who represented the Grenada national team
