= Monroe County School District (Florida) =

School district in Florida, United States

Address
- 241 Trumbo Road Key West, Florida, 33040; United States

District information
- Type: Public
- Motto: "Charting the course to change"
- Grades: VPK to 12 (with adult education programs)
- Superintendent: Edward C. Tierney
- NCES District ID: 1201320

Students and staff
- Students: 8,477
- Teachers: 575
- Staff: 476

Other information
- Website: www.keysschools.com

Monroe County School District is a public school district serving the residents of Monroe County, Florida. The district's administrative offices are headquartered in Key West, Florida, United States, with school sites located throughout the Florida Keys from Key West to Key Largo. The district provides educational services for students enrolled in Pre-Kindergarten through 12th grade and educational opportunities for adult learners enrolled through adult education programs.

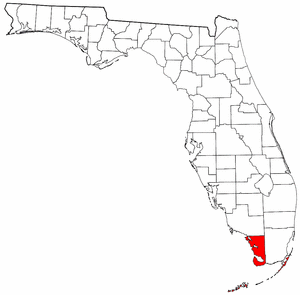
Map of Monroe County, Florida.

The Monroe County School Board oversees the general management of the district and is responsible for appointing a Superintendent of Schools to head the district's administrative departments. Mark T. Porter has served as the Superintendent of Schools since August 1, 2012 until August 1, 2020.

The school district's territory is the entire county.

== Enrollment and demographics ==
As of November 19, 2015, the Monroe County School District reports a current enrollment of 8,477 students (including students enrolled at district charter schools) and an employee count of 1049 staff members. The employee count includes 575 teachers and 476 non-instructional staff stationed at more than 15 sites within Monroe County.

Monroe County School District Enrollment Data, November 2015
| Grade | Number of Students | Percent |
|---|---|---|
| Pre-Kindergarten | 440 | 5.2% |
| Kindergarten | 592 | 7.0% |
| Grade 1-5 | 3285 | 38.7% |
| Grade 6-8 | 1787 | 21.1% |
| Grades 9-12 | 2373 | 28.0% |
| Total | 8477 | 100% |

The Monroe County School District serves an ethnically diverse population with 52.4% of enrolled students identifying as an ethnicity other than non-Hispanic white. This majority includes a significant number of students who predominantly identify with the local Hispanic population, of any race, accounting for 37.4% of all students. 47.6% of students identify as non-Hispanic white and 10.6% as non-Hispanic black.

Monroe County School District Ethnicity Data, November 2015
| Ethnicity | Number of Students | Percent |
|---|---|---|
| Asian | 147 | 1.7% |
| Black | 896 | 10.6% |
| Hispanic | 3,169 | 37.4% |
| Indian | 11 | 0.1% |
| Multi-Racial | 222 | 2.6% |
| White | 4,032 | 47.6% |
| Total | 8,477 | 100% |

== Schools in Monroe County ==
=== District schools ===
6-12 schools

- Marathon Middle High School (Marathon) (Dolphin)

High schools

- Coral Shores High School (Islamorada) (Hurricane)
- Key West High School (Key West) (Fighting Conch)

K-8 schools

- Horace O'Bryant School (Key West)
- Key Largo School (Unincorporated area, on Key Largo)
- Plantation Key School (Islamorada)
- Sugarloaf School (Unincorporated area, on Sugarloaf Key)

Elementary schools

- Gerald Adams Elementary School (Key West)
- Poinciana Elementary School (Key West)
- Stanley Switlik Elementary School (Marathon)

=== Charter schools ===
- Big Pine Academy (Unincorporated area, on Big Pine Key)
- College of the Florida Keys Academy (Key West)
- May Sands Montessori Charter School (Key West)
- Ocean Studies Charter School (Key Largo)
- Sigsbee Charter School (Key West)
- Somerset Island Prep(Key West)
- Treasure Village Montessori Charter School (Islamorada)
